= Futatsuyama Kofun =

Kofun period burial mound in Ōta, Gunma, Japan

Futatuyama Kofun No.1
- 二ツ山古墳 (Japanese)
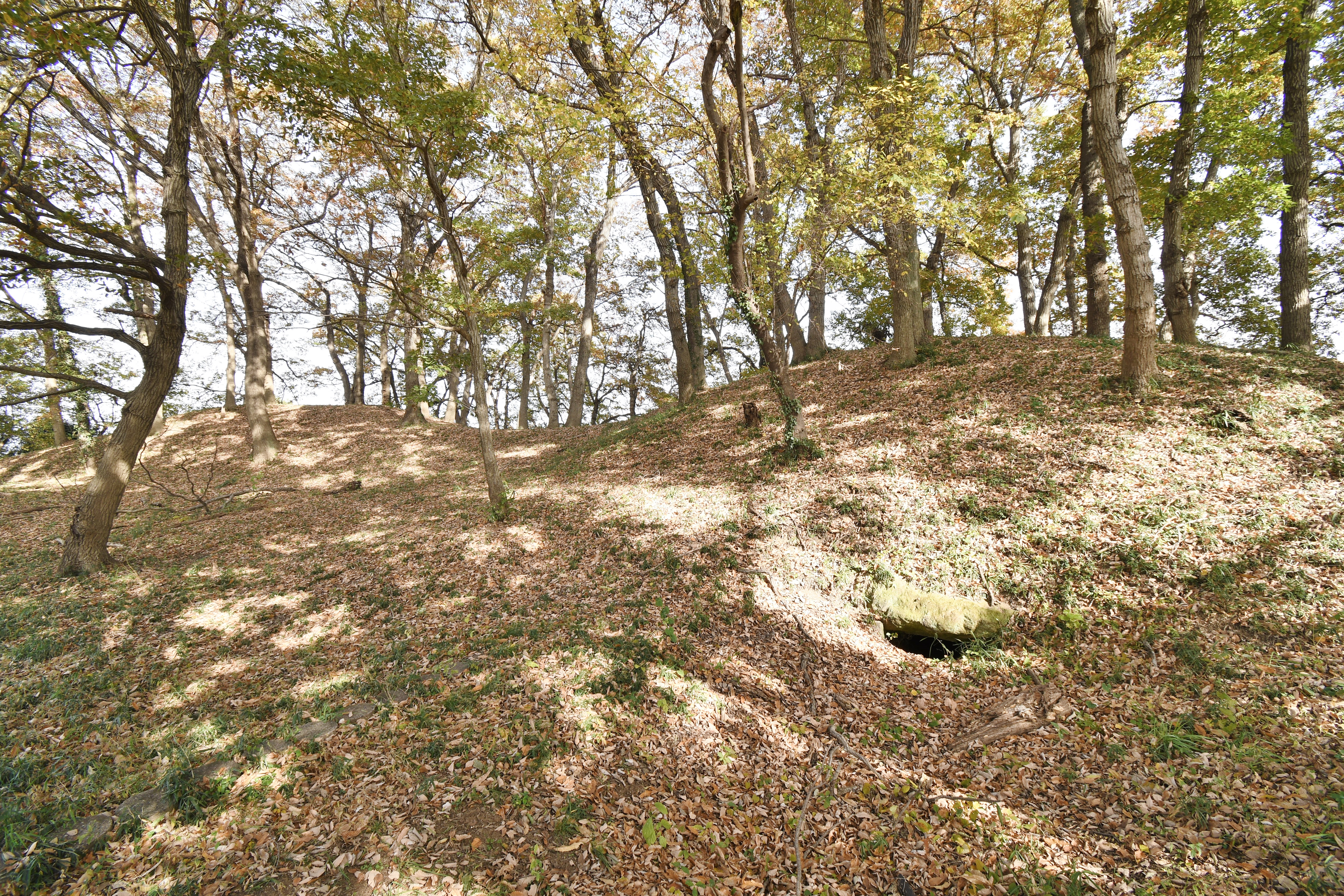
- Futatuyama Kofun No.1

- Futatuyama Kofun No.1 Futatsuyama Kofun (Japan)
- 36°20′12.40″N 139°19′10.13″E
- Type: Kofun
- Periods: Kofun period
- Location: Nitta-Tenra-cho, Ōta, Gunma, Japan
- Region: Kantō region

History
- Built: late 6th - early 7th century

Site notes
- Public access: Yes (no facilities)
- Gunma Prefecture Historic Site

二ツ山古墳分布図

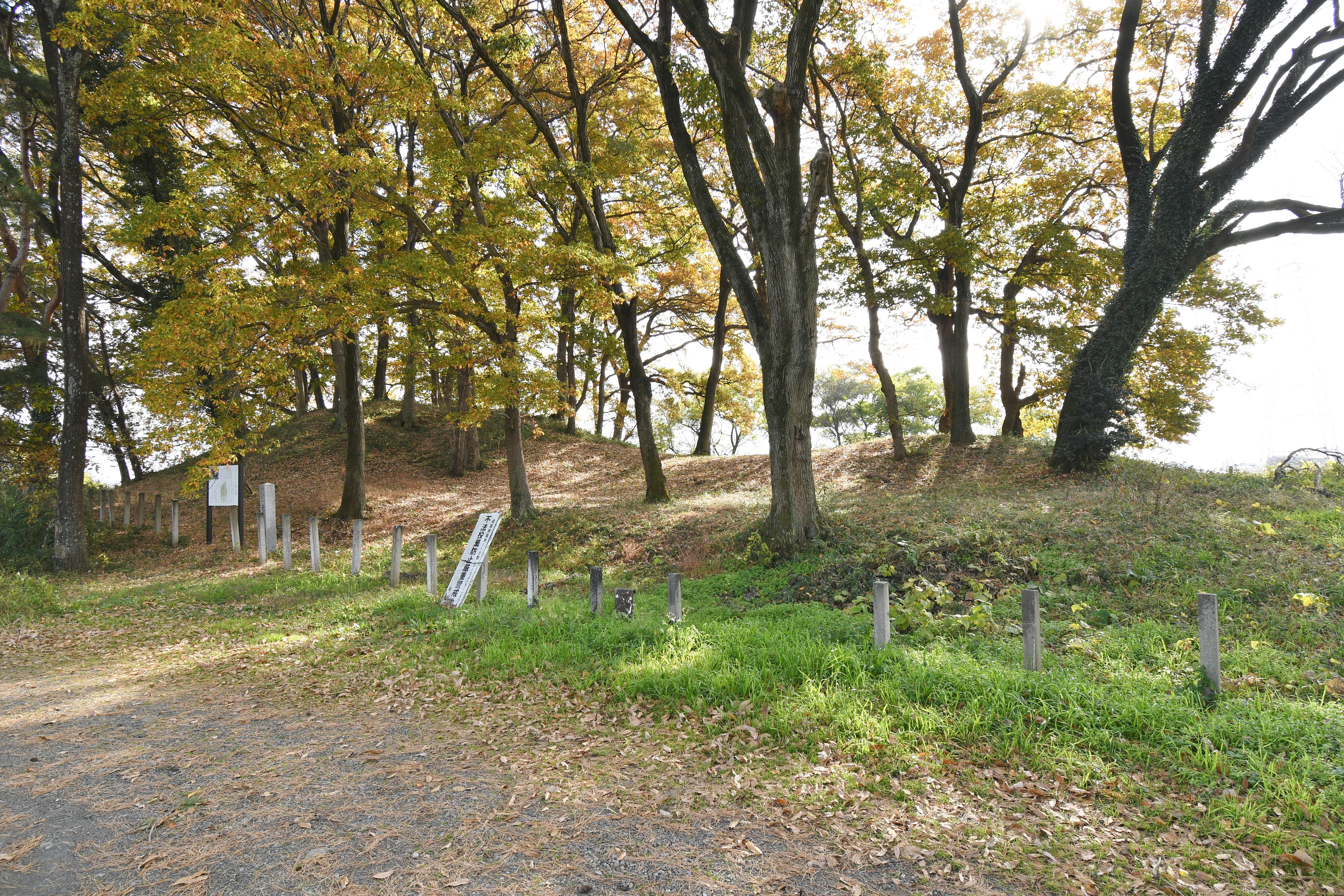
Futatsuyama Kofun No.2

The Futatsuyama Kofun (二ツ山古墳) is the name for a pair of Kofun period keyhole-shaped burial mounds, located in the Nitta-Tenra-cho neighborhood of the city of Ōta, Gunma in the Kantō region of Japan. The pair of tumuli was collectively designated a Gunma Prefecture Historic Site in 1948, with the area under protection expanded in 1984.

== Overview ==
The Futatsuyama Kofun are both a zenpō-kōen-fun (前方後円墳), which are shaped like a keyhole, having one square end and one circular end, when viewed from above. The kofun are located in eastern Gunma Prefecture, near the eastern edge of the Omama alluvial fan. These kofun are the only survivors of a cluster of enpun (円墳)-style circular kofun in the surrounding area, all of which have been lost. Archeological excavations have been conducted primarily around Futatsuyama Kofun No.1. Both kofun have horizontal-entry stone burial chambers as burial facilities. The construction period of Futatsuyama Kofun No.1 and Futatsuyama Kofun No.2 is estimated to be the late to final period of the Kofun era, around the late 6th to early 7th centuries. Based on the relationship of the surrounding moats, it is assumed that Futatsuyama Kofun No.1 preceded No.2. The presence of the Kōzuke Province Nitta Gunchō ruins (a National Historic Site) to the south and the Terai temple ruins (a Hakuhō period temple) to the southeast suggests a possible connection.

=== Futatsuyama Kofun No.1 ===
Futatsuyama Kofun No.1 is a keyhole-shaped zenpōkōenfun tumulus, with the anterior rectangular section orientated to the northwest. The mound is constructed in two tiers, and (including the surrounding horseshoe-shaped moat) is 120 meters long. On the outer surface of the mound, in addition to fukiishi revetment stones, a double row of cylindrical haniwa and figurative haniwa (human figures, horse figures, etc.) have been found on the lower flat section (base), and house-shaped haniwa have been discovered on the summit. Among the figurative haniwa, more than 12 horse-shaped haniwa and human-shaped haniwa have been found inside the row of cylindrical haniwa, and human-shaped, bird-shaped, quiver-shaped, and shadow-shaped haniwa have been found in both constricted sections. In addition, more than four house-shaped haniwa are placed on the top of the front rectangular section.

The burial facility is a horizontal-entry stone chamber in the posterior circular section, opening to the south-southwest. It has a total length of 7.2 meters, with the chamber proper measuring 4.8 by 1.9 meters with a height of 2.2 meters. The material of the burial chamber is natural stone, with the back wall made from a single monolith, and the floor at the rear of the chamber covered with rounded pebbles and clay. Grave goods such as an ornate sword and horse trappings and Sue ware pottery have been unearthed from the stone chamber. It was excavated in 1888, 1948 and 1981. Artifacts found at this site included a Double-dragon ring-pommel sword, iron spear, iron arrowheads, iron knife and horse trappings. These items are stored at various locations: the Ota City Board of Education, Keio University, the Imperial Household Agency, and the Tokyo National Museum.

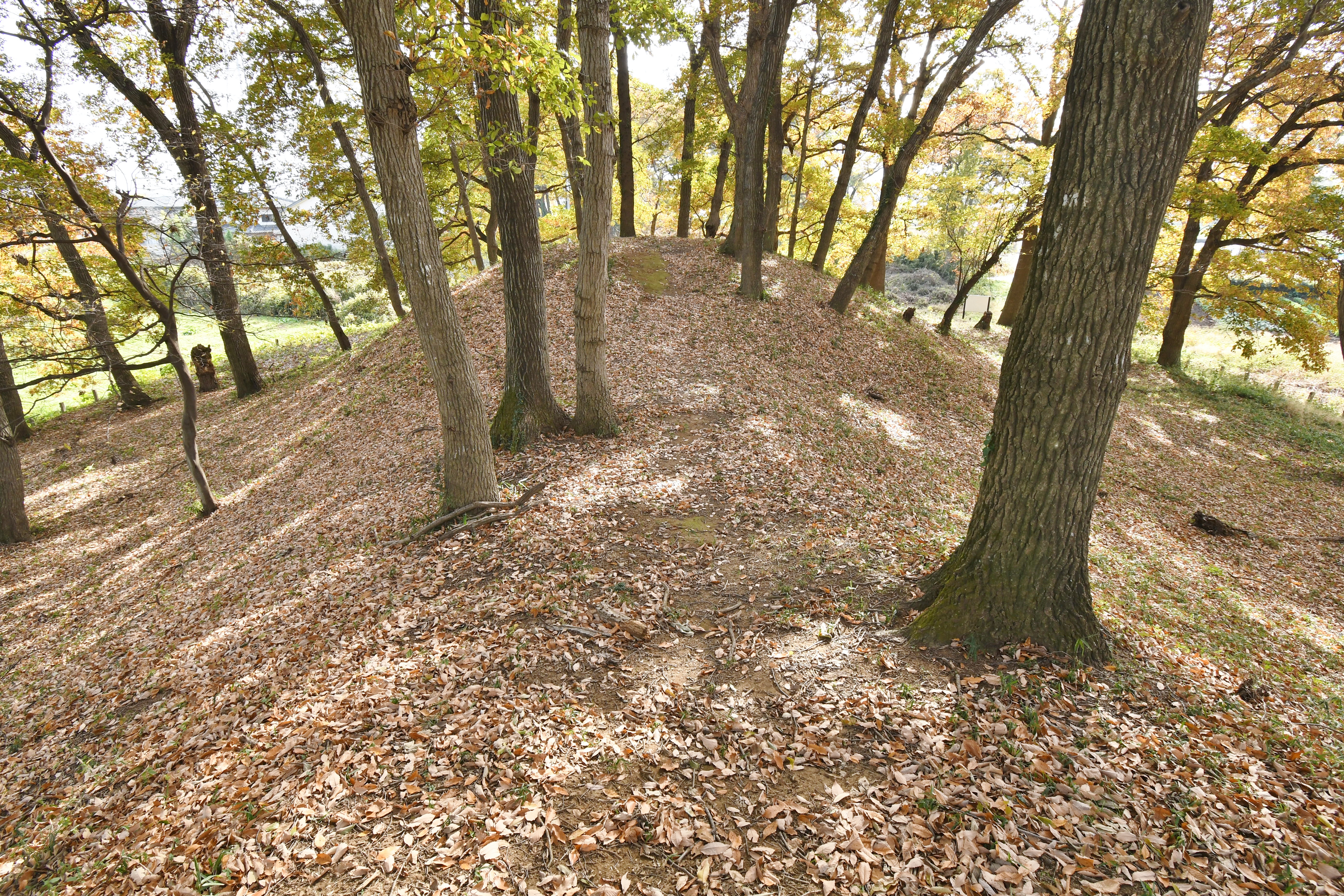
View from the front section to the rear section

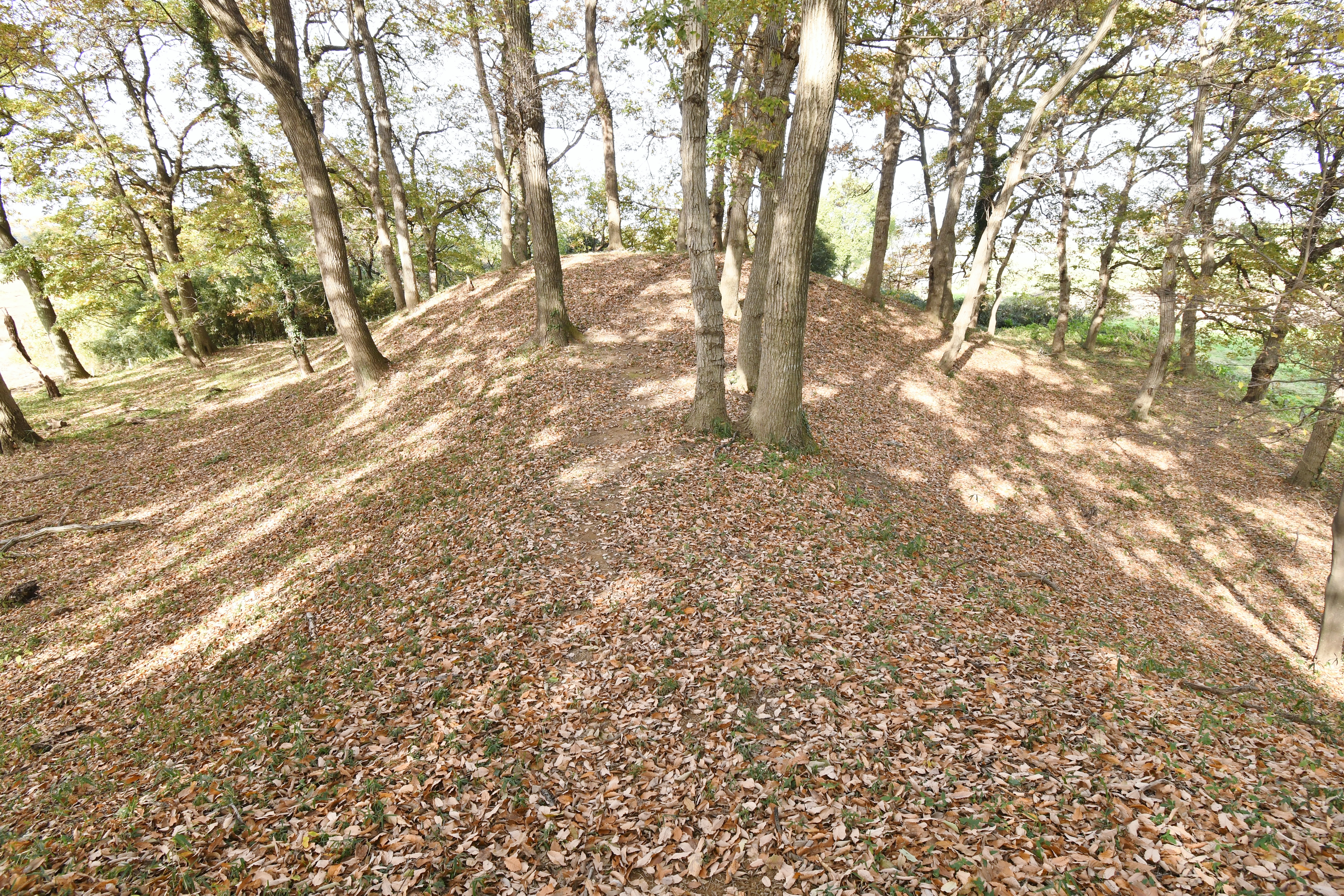
View from the rear section to the front section

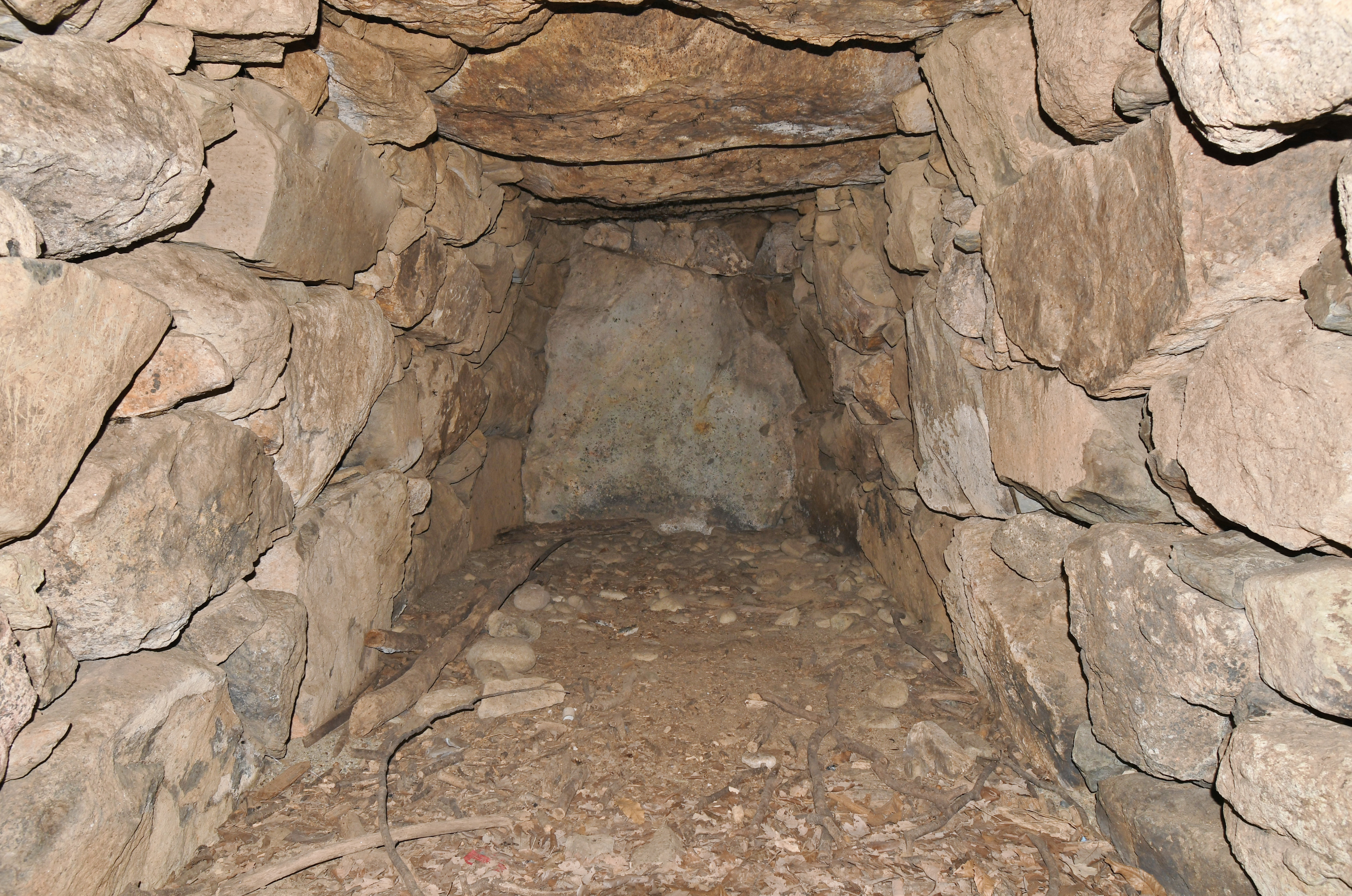
Burial chamber（looking to rear wall）

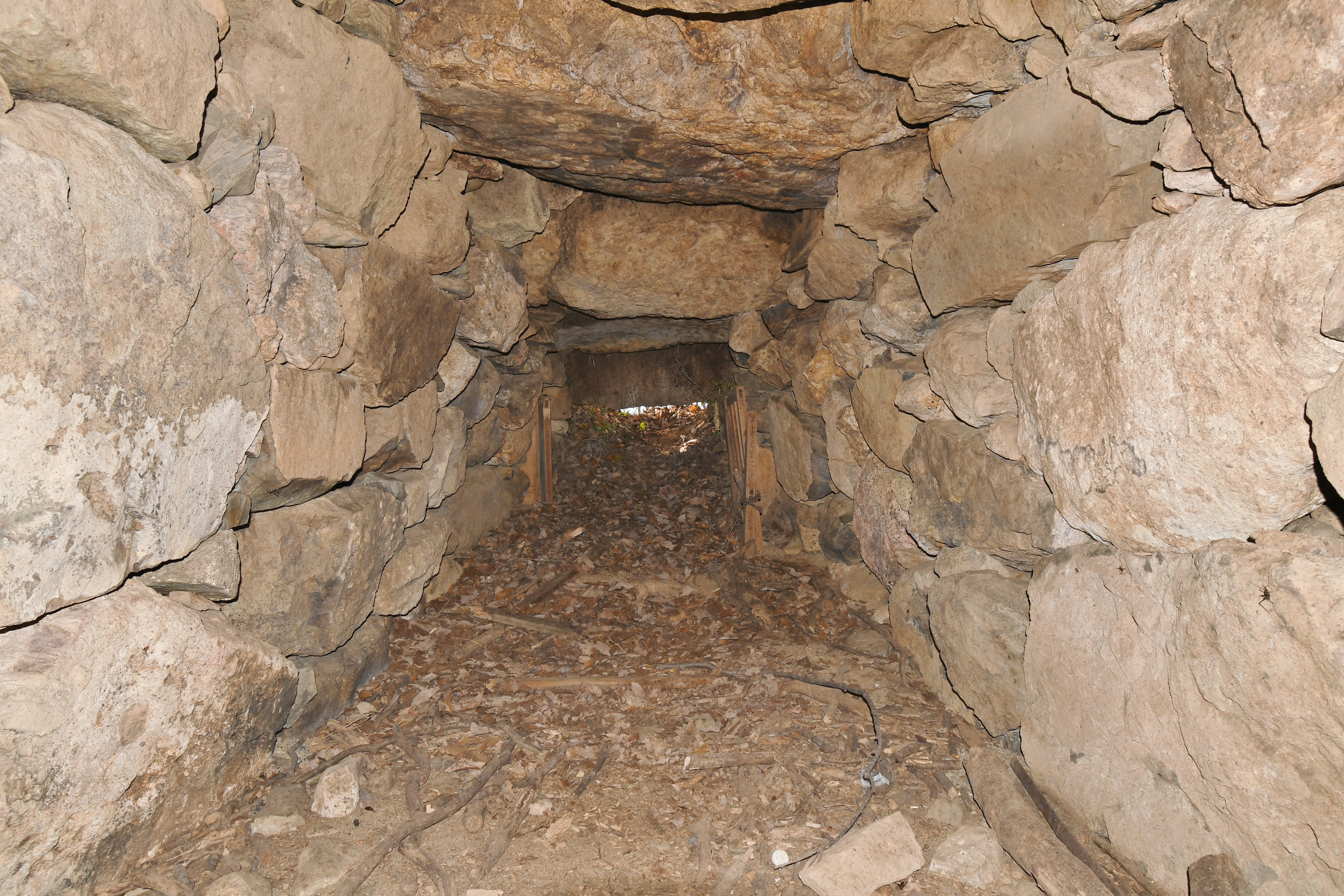
Burial chamber（looking toward entry）

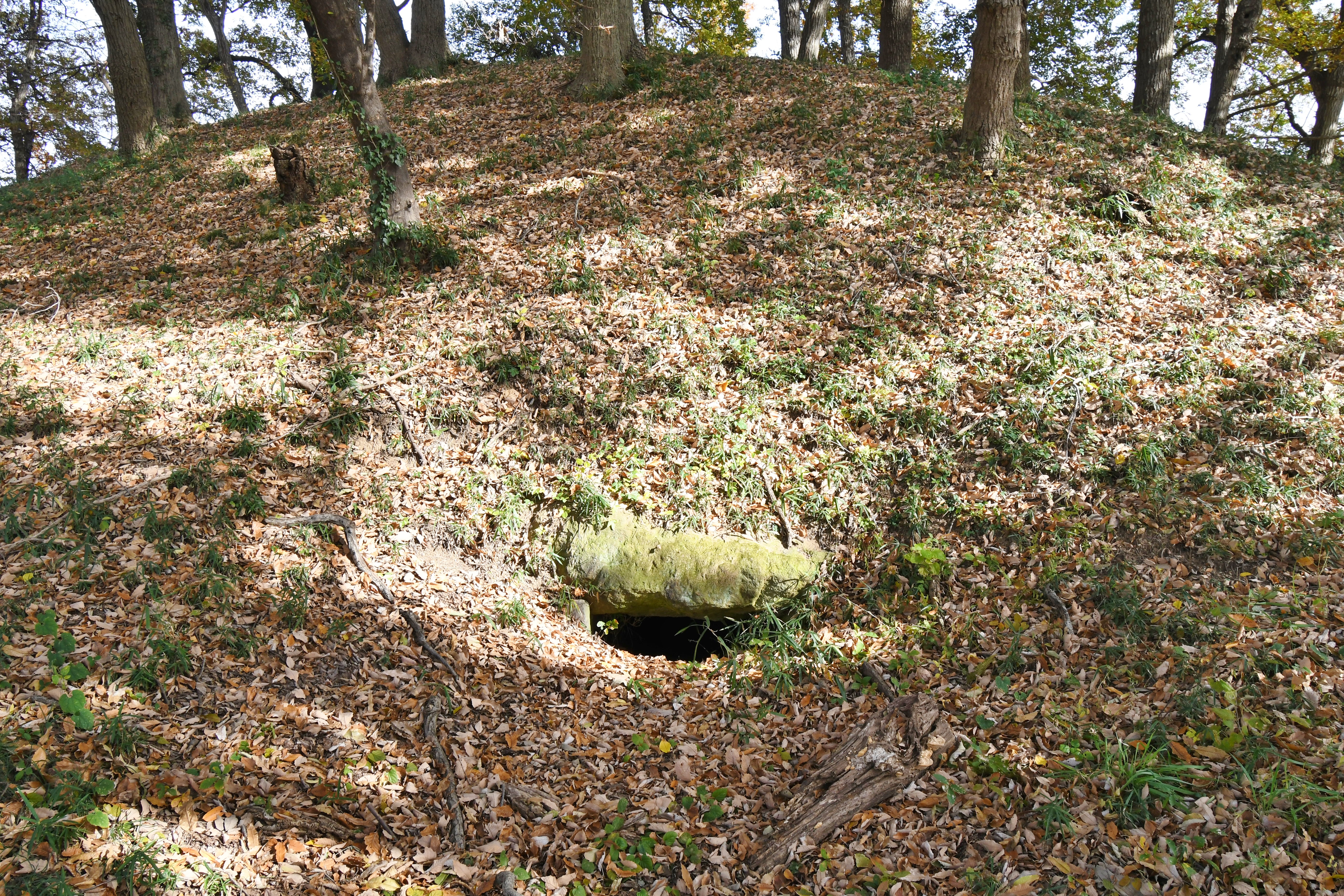
Entrance of the burial chamber

Total length
74 meters
Anterior rectangular portion
61 meters wide
Posterior circular portion
45 meter diameter, 6 meters high

=== Futatsuyama Kofun No.2 ===
Futatsuyama Kofun No.2 is also keyhole-shaped zenpōkōenfun tumulus, but is orientated to the west. The mound is constructed in two tiers and is surrounded by a moat. Besides fukiishi revetment stones, cylindrical and human-shaped haniwa are found on the surface of the mound. The burial chamber is a horizontal-entry stone chamber, opening to the south. It is 2.8 wide and 1.95 meters high, with a 4.2 meter by one meter passageway. It was excavated in 1988, and again in 1974 and 2000, but aside from haniwa, no but grave goods have been found.

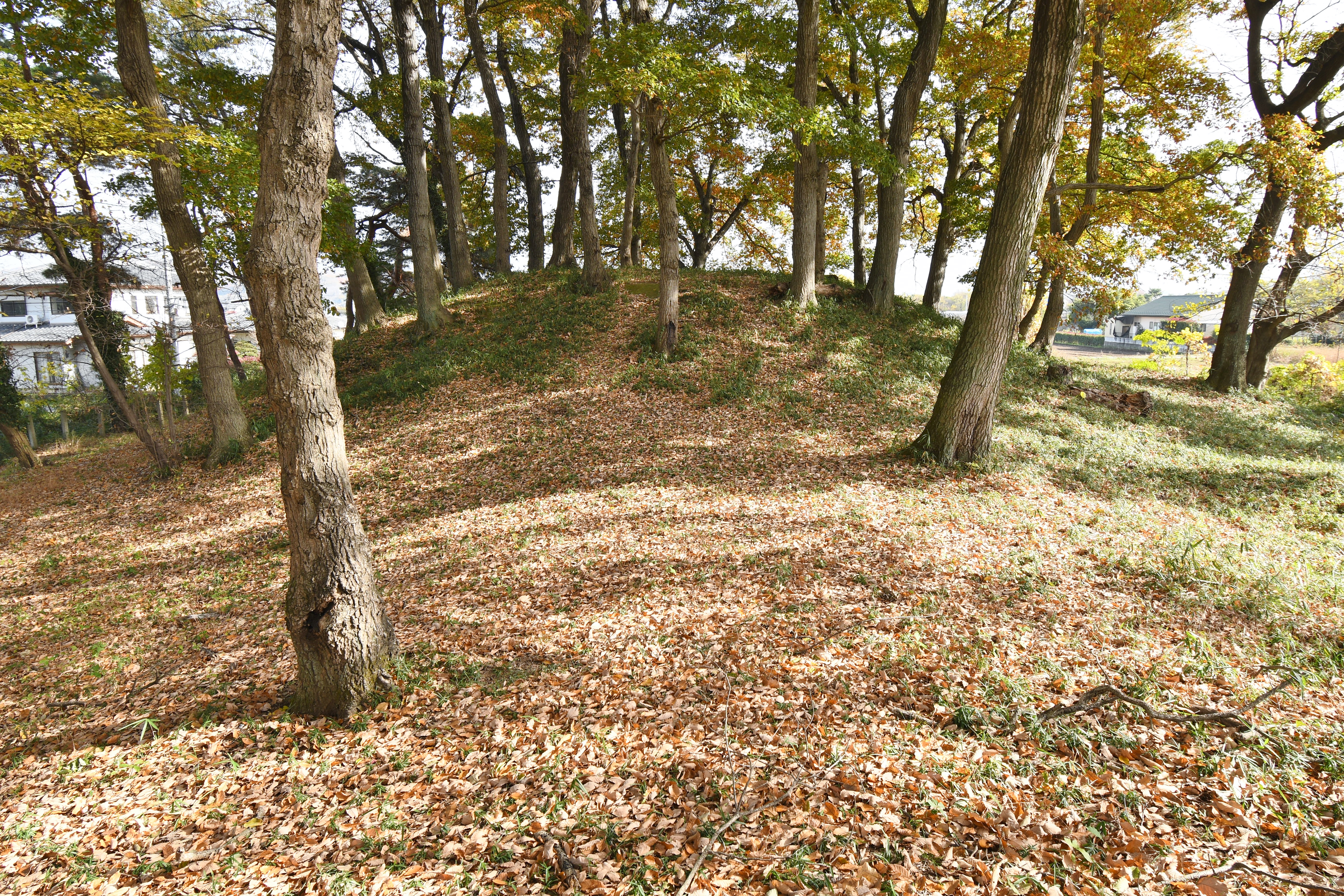
View from the front to the rear circular section

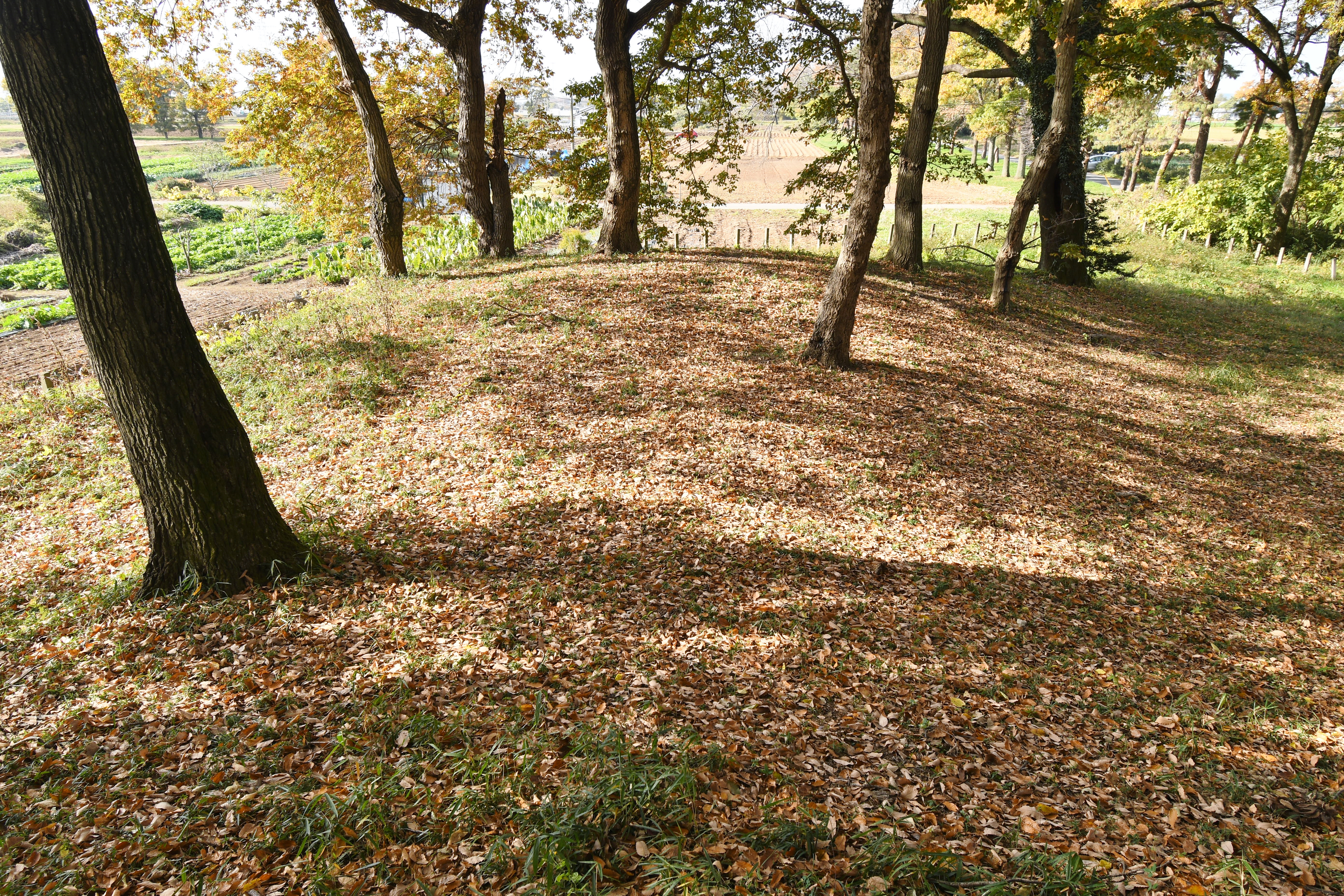
View from the rear to the front rectaangular section

Total length
45 meters
Anterior rectangular portion
22 meters wide, 3 meters high
Posterior circular portion
32 meter diameter, 6 meters high

The tumuli are approximately 1.5 kilometers northwest of JR East Jiroembashi Station on the Tōbu Kiryū Line.

== See also ==
- List of Historic Sites of Japan (Gunma)
