= Tsuruyama Kofun =

Kofun period burial mound in Ōta, Gunma, Japan

- 鶴山古墳 (Japanese)
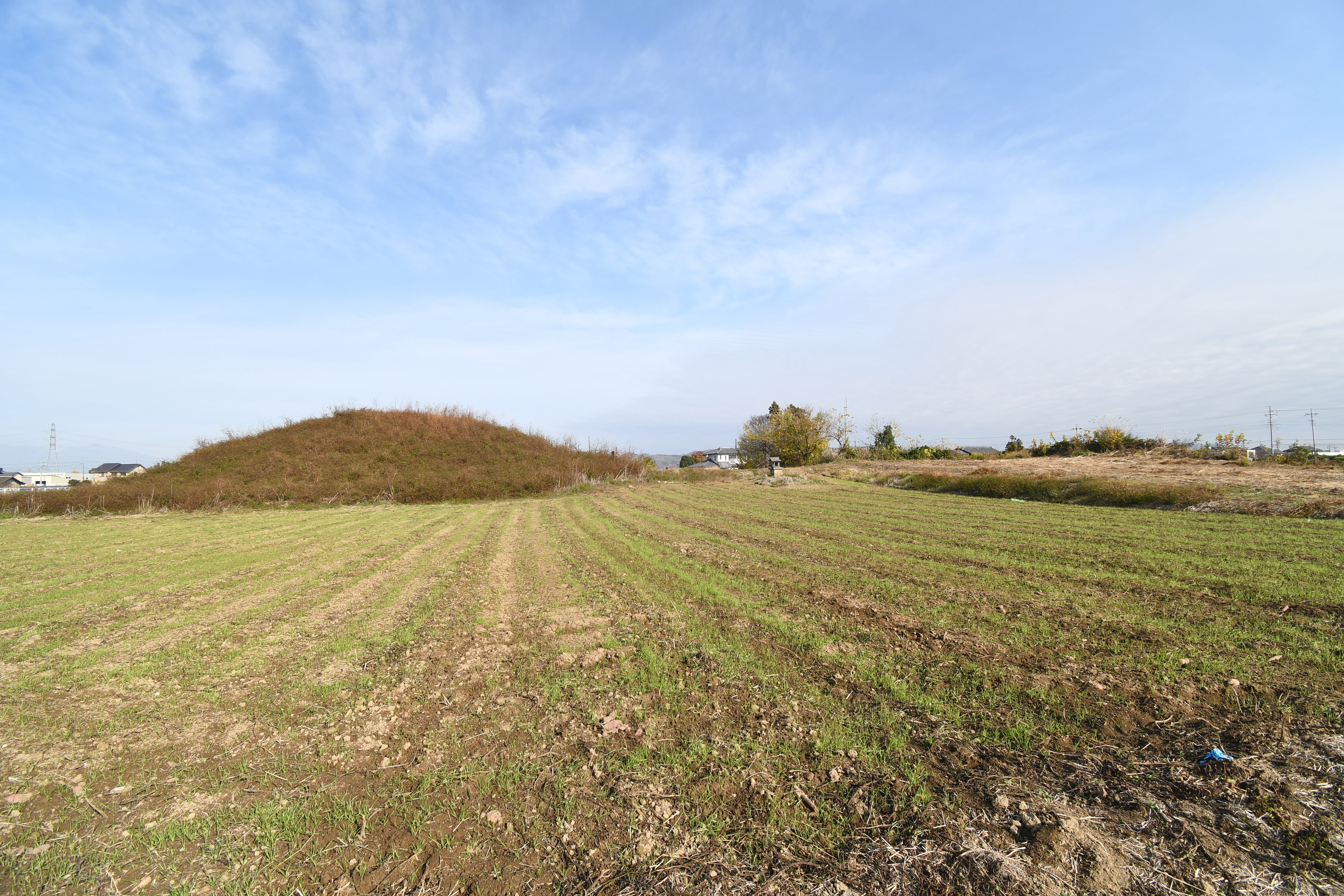
- Tsuruyama Kofun

- Tsuruyama Kofun Tsuruyama Kofun (Japan)
- 36°19′27.08″N 139°20′25.88″E
- Type: Kofun
- Periods: Kofun period
- Location: Toriyamakamicho, Ōta, Gunma, Japan
- Region: Kantō region

History
- Built: mid 5th century

Site notes
- Public access: Yes (no facilities)
- Gunma Prefecture Historic Site

The Tsuruyama Kofun (鶴山古墳) is a Kofun period keyhole-shaped burial mound, located in the Toriyamakamicho neighborhood of the city of Ōta, Gunma in the Kantō region of Japan. The tumulus was designated a Gunma Prefecture Historic Site in 1951..

== Overview ==
The Tsuruyama Kofun is a zenpō-kōen-fun (前方後円墳), which is shaped like a keyhole, having one square end and one circular end, when viewed from above. It is located on the southeastern edge of the Omama alluvial fan, west of the Kanayama Hills, in eastern Gunma Prefecture. The front section has been largely leveled, and an archaeological excavation was conducted in 1948.

The mound is orientated facing southeast. No fukiishi revetment stones or haniwa clay figures have been found on the outer surface of the mound, which is surrounded by a moat. The tumulus is currently 95 meters long, but is estimated to have originally been around 102 meters, taking into account lesses due to cultivation. The posterior circular portion is approximately 50 meters in diameter and 7.5 meters high. The anterior rectangular portion has a width of 55 meters and height of three meters.

The burial facility is a vertical shaft stone burial chamber in the center of the posterior circular section, containing a wooden coffin, with the main axis of the stone chamber oriented northeast. The burial chamber measures 2.8 meters in length, 0.77 meters in width at the eastern end, 0.58 meters in width at the western end, and 0.6 meters in depth. It is constructed of flat, split stones placed vertically. Each side wall consists of five stones, while the ends consist of a single monolith. Numerous grave goods, including human bones (upper and lower limb bones) and armor ( two helmets, three riveted plate cuirasses, and numerous iron artifacts and stone imitations), were found inside and outside the coffin. A herringbone pattern black lacquer shield with red painted corner fittings, adorned with seven mother-of-pearl shells was on top of the coffin.

A clay chamber was also found on the north side outside the stone chamber, which contained iron spears and iron arrowheads. However, the absence of skulls or any ornaments makes the site unique. The Nihon Shoki records that a member of the Kamitsukeno clan, a powerful clan from this area, went on an expedition to the Korean Peninsula and died in battle overseas. His body was returned home headless, and due to the unusual circumstances, no funeral rites were performed. As the construction period of the tumulus is estimated to be around the mid-5th century, during the middle of the Kofun period, this timeline matches the Nihon Shoki account.

Some of the artifacts are on display at the Gunma Prefectural Museum of History.

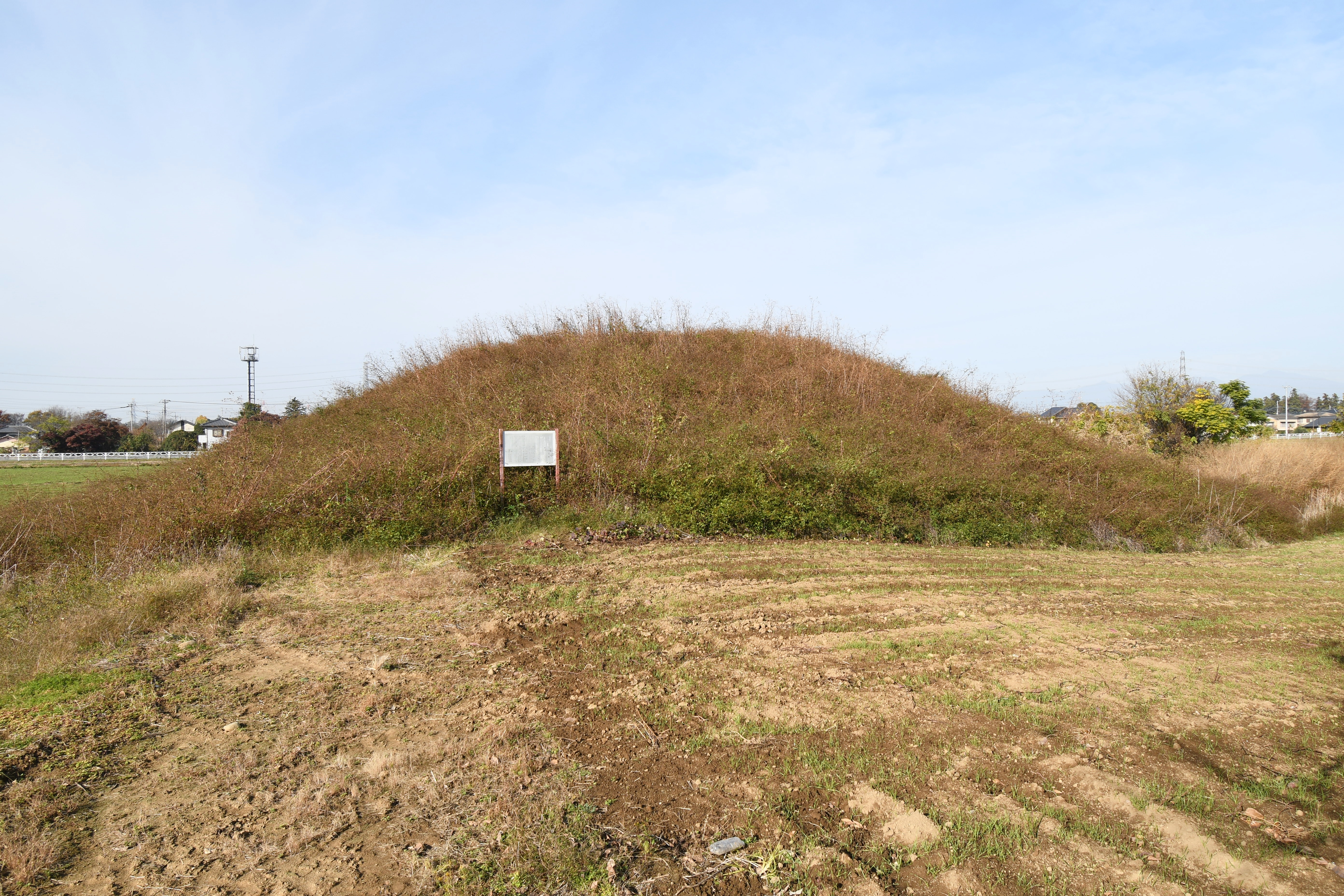
View from the front to the rear circular section

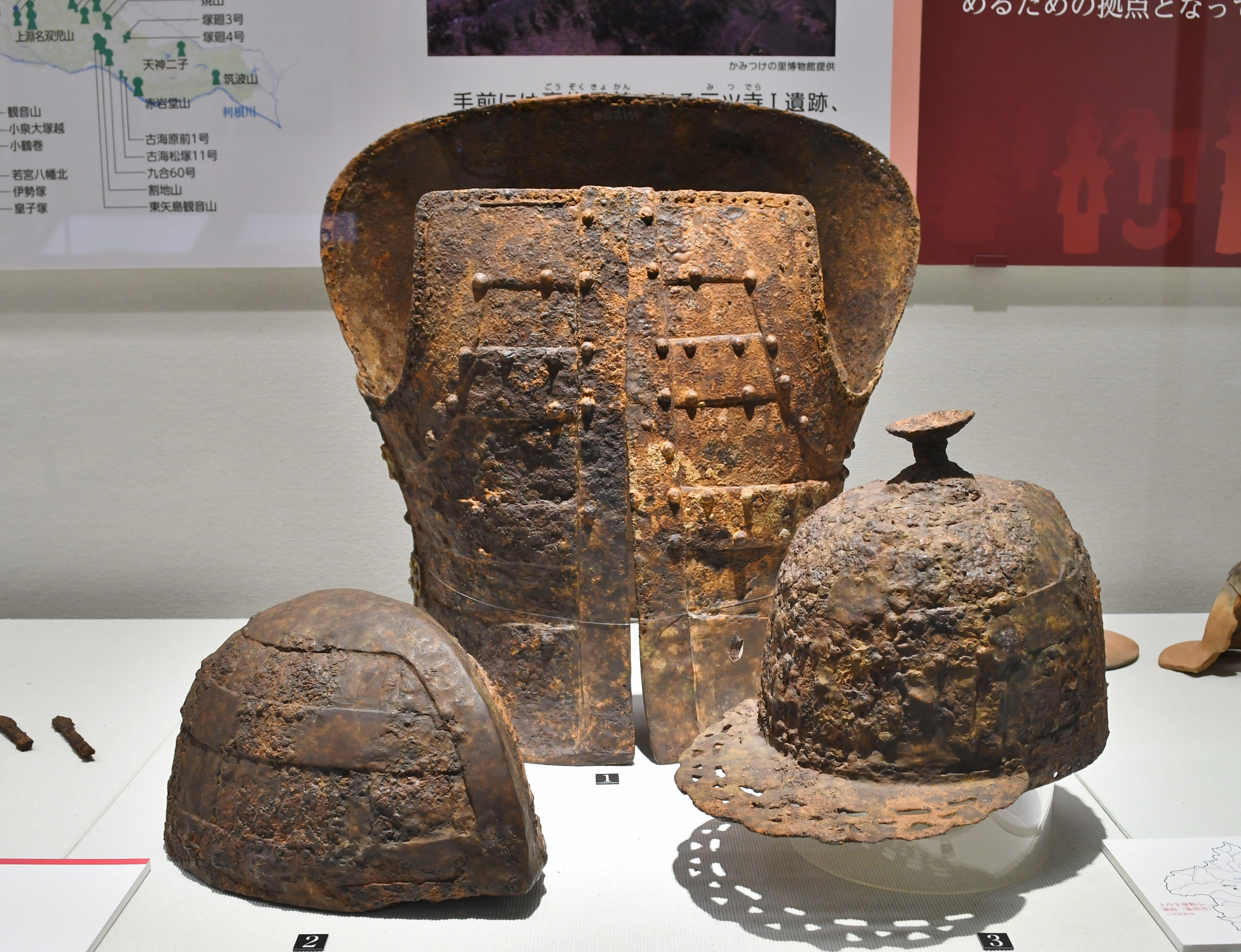
Grave goods (armor)

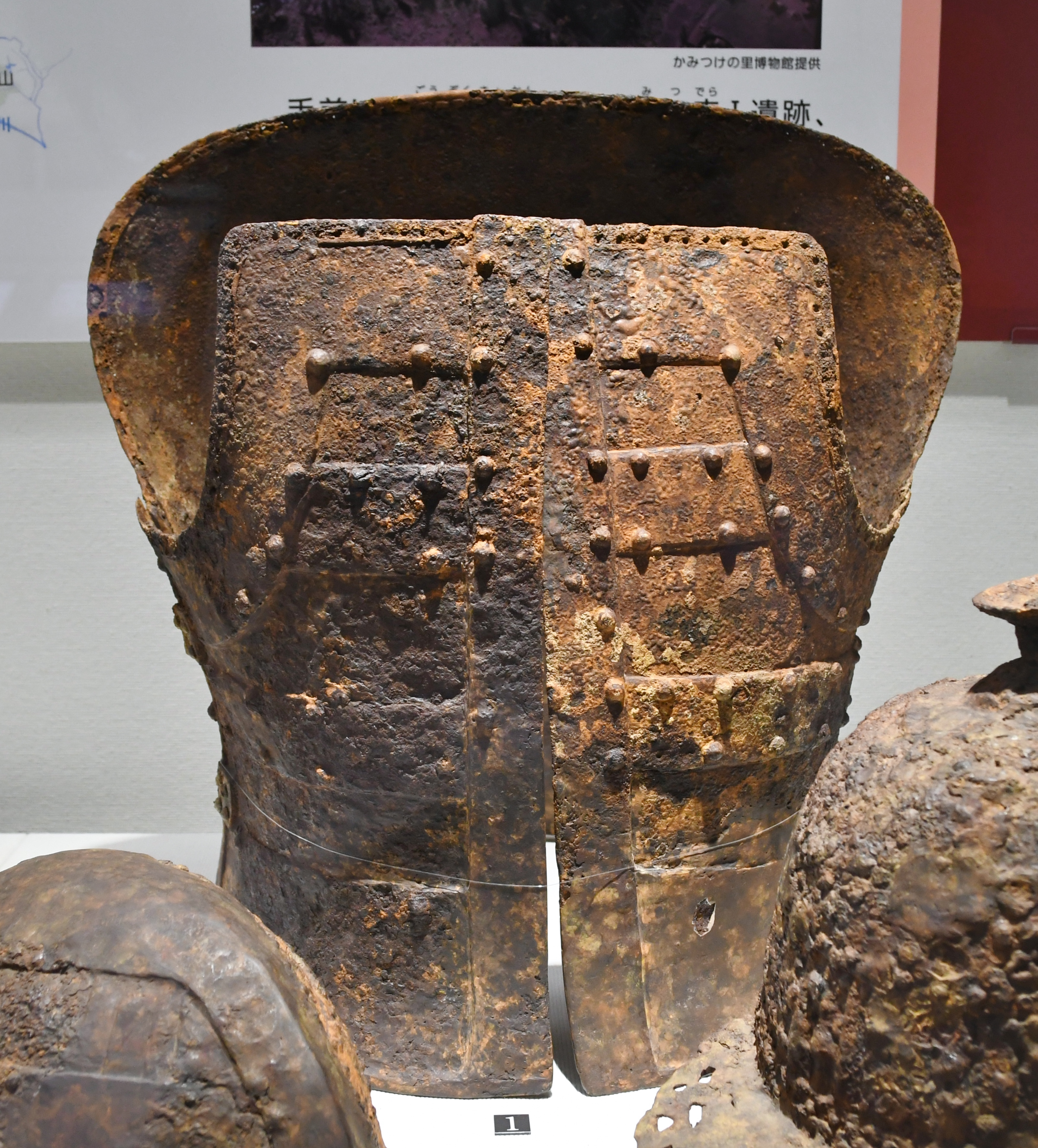
No. 1 Short Armor

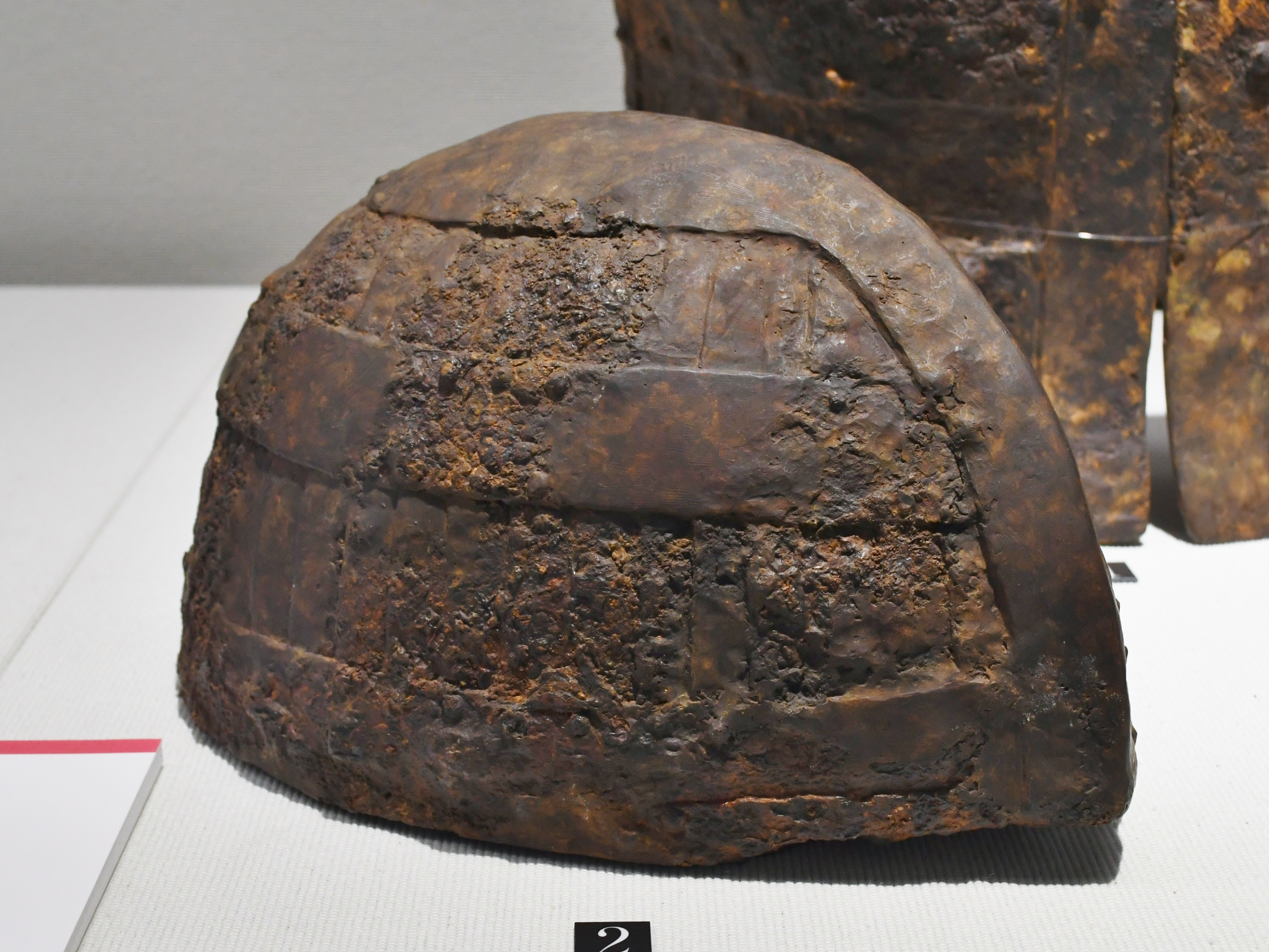
Helm

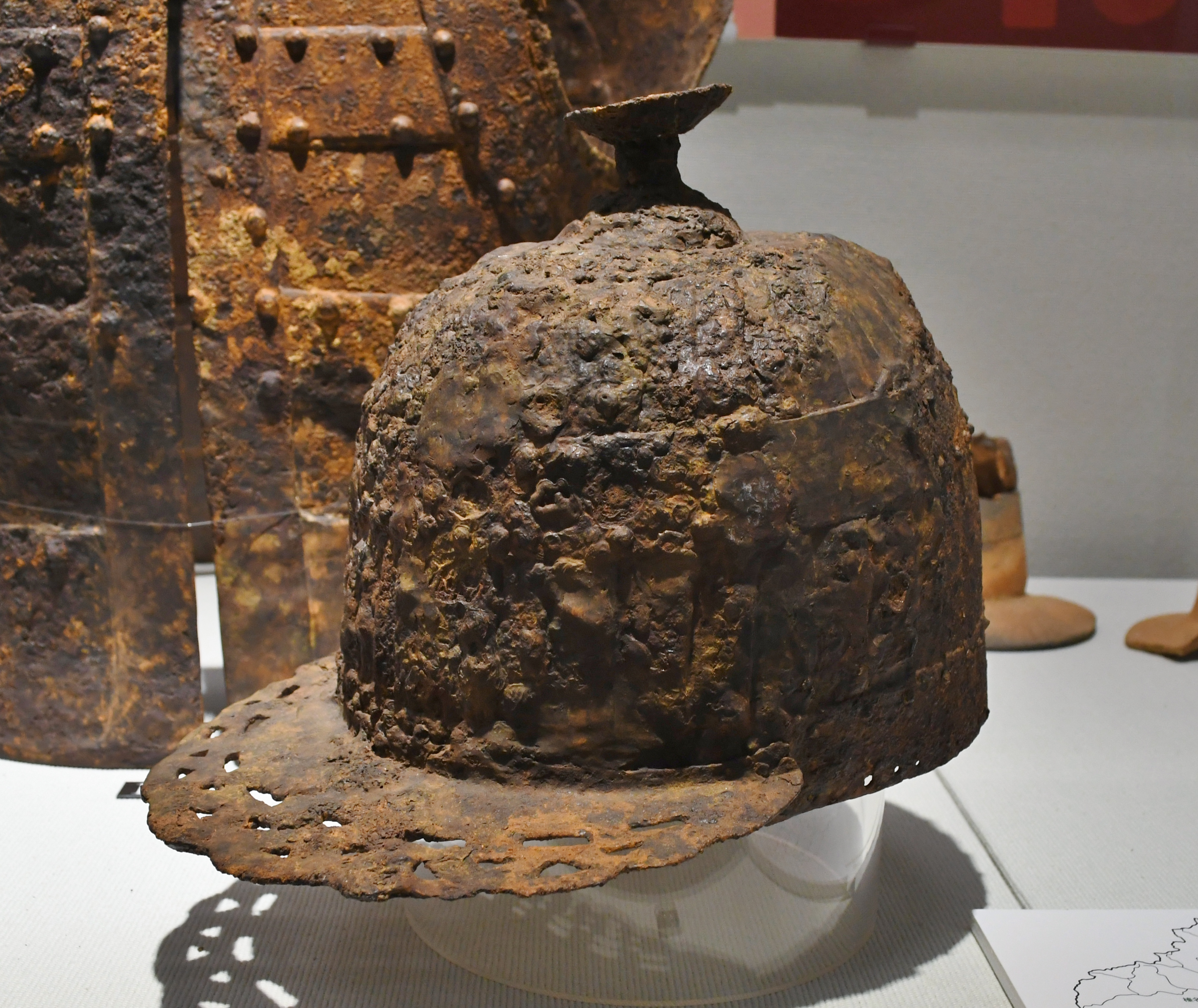
Helmet with Visor

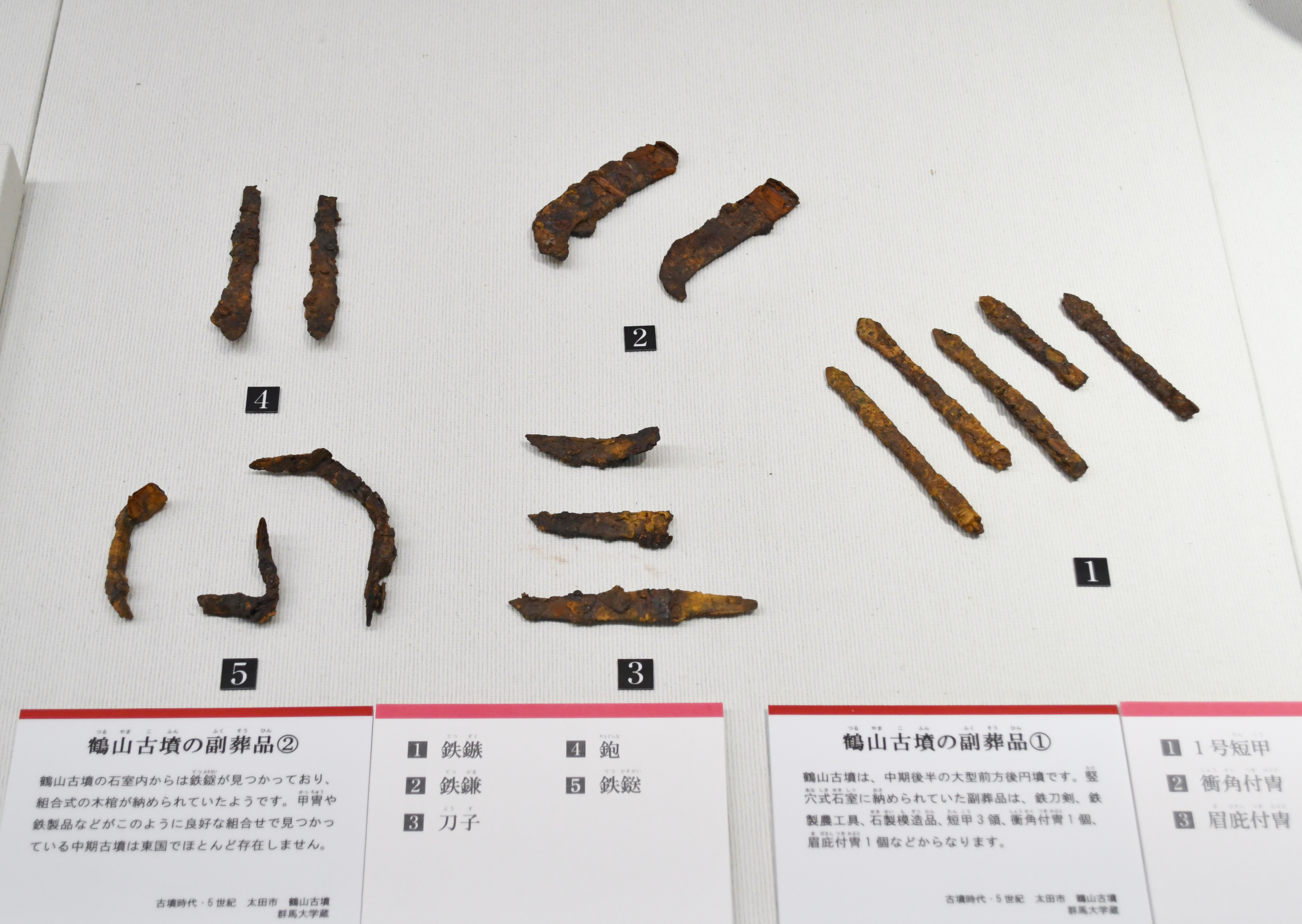
Iron products

The tumulus is approximately 1.4 kilometers south of JR East Jiroembashi Station on the Tōbu Kiryū Line.

Total length
95 meters (current, estimated 102 meters originally)
Anterior rectangular portion
55 meters wide, 3 meters high
Posterior circular portion
50 meter diameter, 7.5 meters high

== See also ==
- List of Historic Sites of Japan (Gunma)
