= Azami Station =

Railway station in Midori, Gunma Prefecture, Japan

TI54 Azami Station 阿左美駅
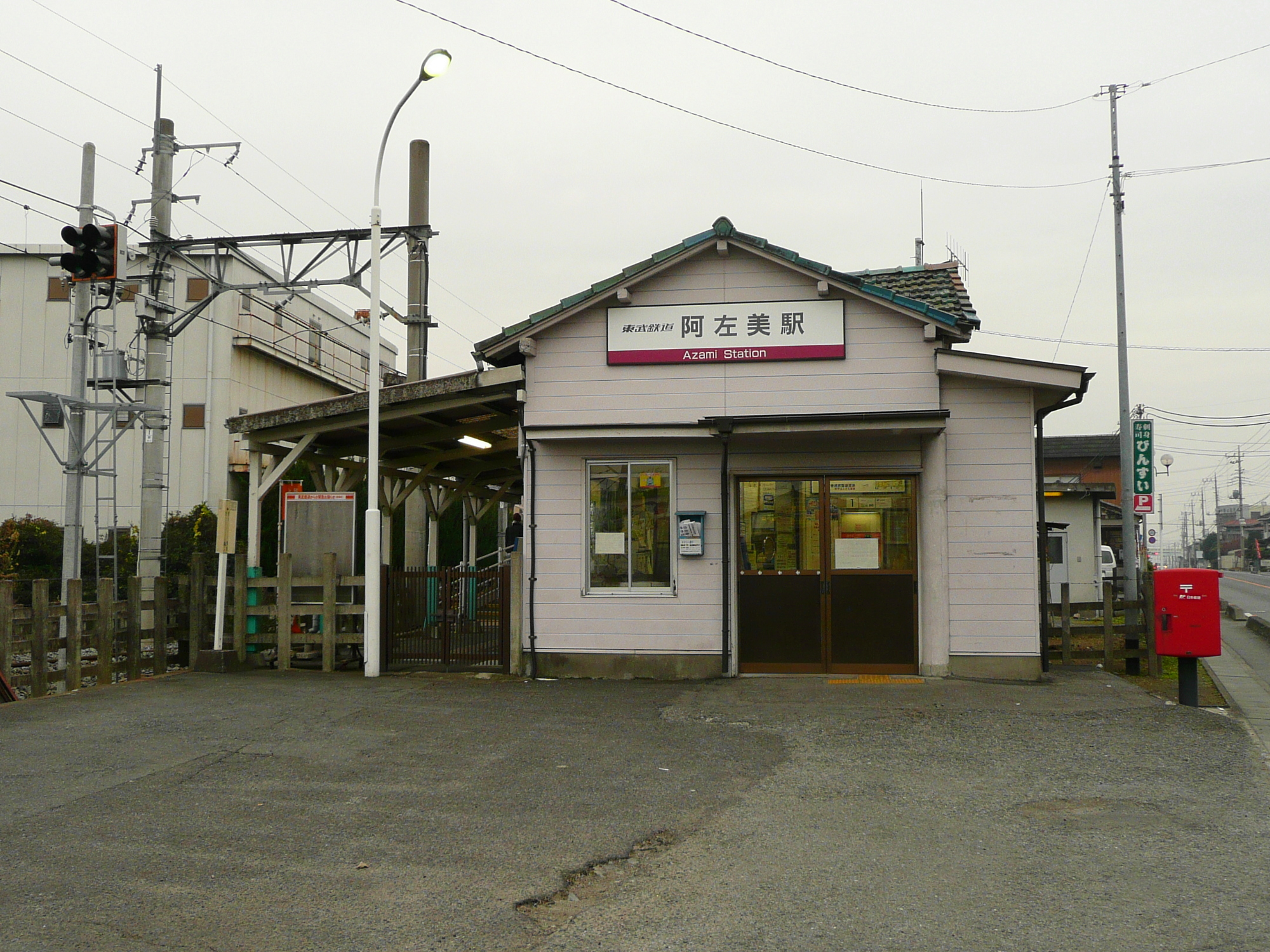
- Azami Station in December 2007

General information
- Location: 1057-4 Kasakakemachi Azami, Midori-shi, Gunma-ken 379-2311; Japan
- Coordinates: 36.3853°N 139.3065°E
- Operator: Tōbu Railway
- Line: Tōbu Kiryū Line
- Distance: 13.1 km from Ōta
- Platforms: 1 side platform

Other information
- Station code: TI-54
- Website: Official website

History
- Opened: May 5, 1937

Passengers
- FY2019: 573 daily

Services
Preceding station	Tobu Railway	Following station
Yabuzuka TI53 towards Ōta	Kiryū Line	Shin-Kiryū TI55 towards Akagi
Location
- Location within Gunma Prefecture Location within Japan

Azami Station (阿左美駅, Azami-eki) is a passenger railway station in the city of Midori, Gunma, Japan, operated by the private railway operator Tōbu Railway. It is numbered "TI-54".

== Lines ==
Azami Station is served by the Tōbu Kiryū Line, and is located 12.9 kilometers from the terminus of the line at Ōta.

== Station layout ==
The station consists of a single side platform serving traffic in both directions.

== History ==
Azami Station was opened on May 5, 1937. During work to extend the platform from 1954-1955, extensive Jōmon period archaeological remains were discovered, which were proclaimed a Gunma Prefectural Historic Site in 1960.

From March 17, 2012, station numbering was introduced on all Tōbu lines, with Azami Station becoming "TI-54".

== Passenger statistics ==
In fiscal 2019, the station was used by an average of 573 passengers daily (boarding passengers only).

== Surrounding area ==
- Kiryu University
- Azami Marsh

== See also ==
- List of railway stations in Japan
