= Yabuzuka Station =

Railway station in Ōta, Gunma Prefecture, Japan

TI53 Yabuzuka Station 藪塚駅
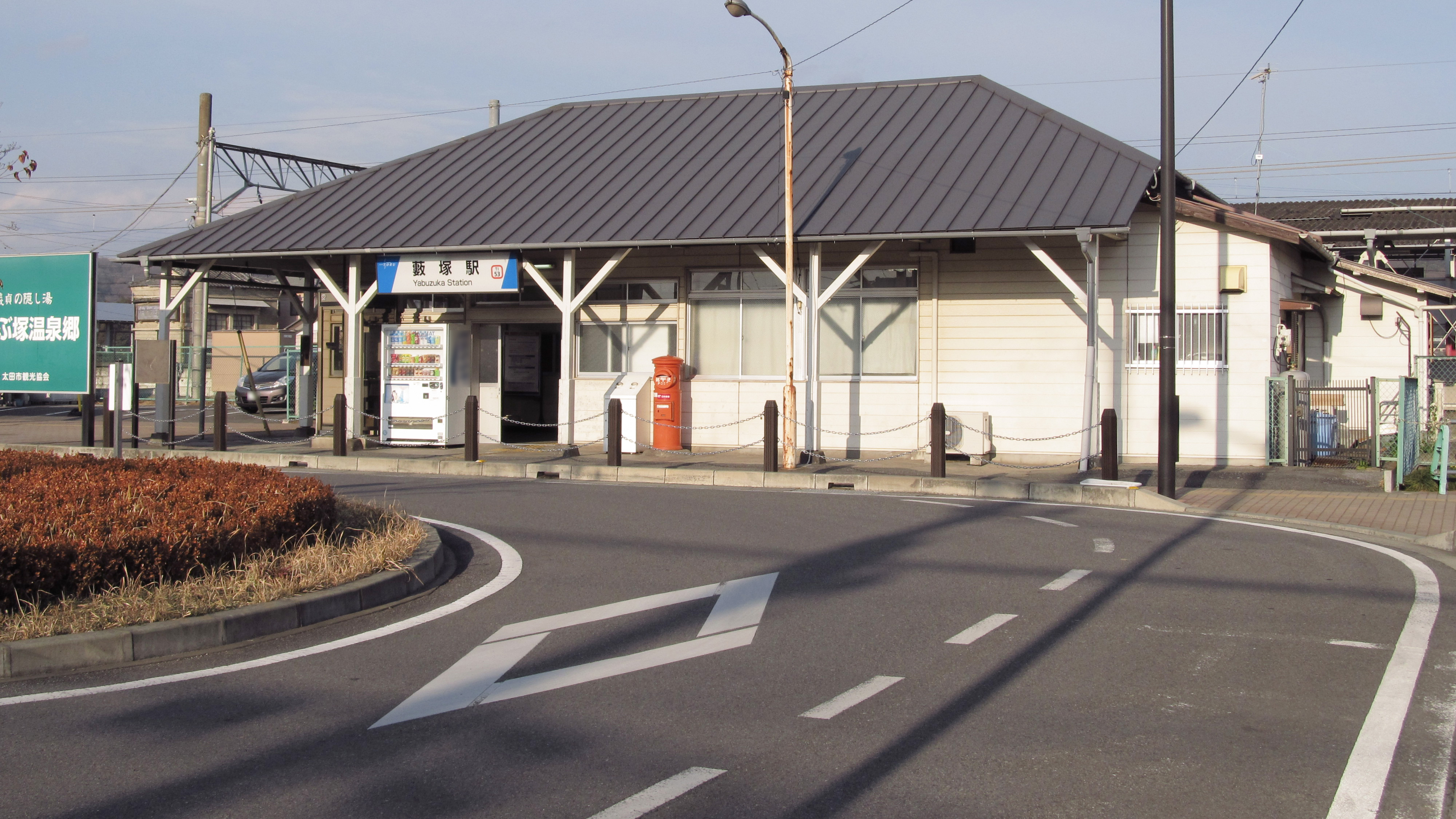
- Yabuzuka Station in December 2014

General information
- Location: 379-2 Yabuzuka Hachikoku, Ōta-shi, Gunma-ken 379-2301; Japan
- Coordinates: 36.3588°N 139.3155°E
- Operator: Tōbu Railway
- Line: Tōbu Kiryū Line
- Distance: 9.7 km from Ōta
- Platforms: 2 side platforms

Other information
- Station code: TI-53
- Website: Official website

History
- Opened: March 19, 1913

Passengers
- FY2019: 1097 daily

Services
Preceding station	Tobu Railway	Following station
Ōta TI18 towards Asakusa	Ryomo	Shin-Kiryū TI55 towards Akagi
Jiroembashi TI52 towards Ōta	Kiryū Line	Azami TI54 towards Akagi
Location
- Location within Gunma Prefecture Location within Japan

Yabuzuka Station (藪塚駅, Yabuzuka-eki) is a passenger railway station in the city of Ōta, Gunma, Japan, operated by the private railway operator Tōbu Railway. It is numbered "TI-53".

== Lines ==
Yabuzuka Station is a station on the Tōbu Kiryū Line, and is located 9.7 kilometers from the terminus of the line at Ōta.

== Station layout ==
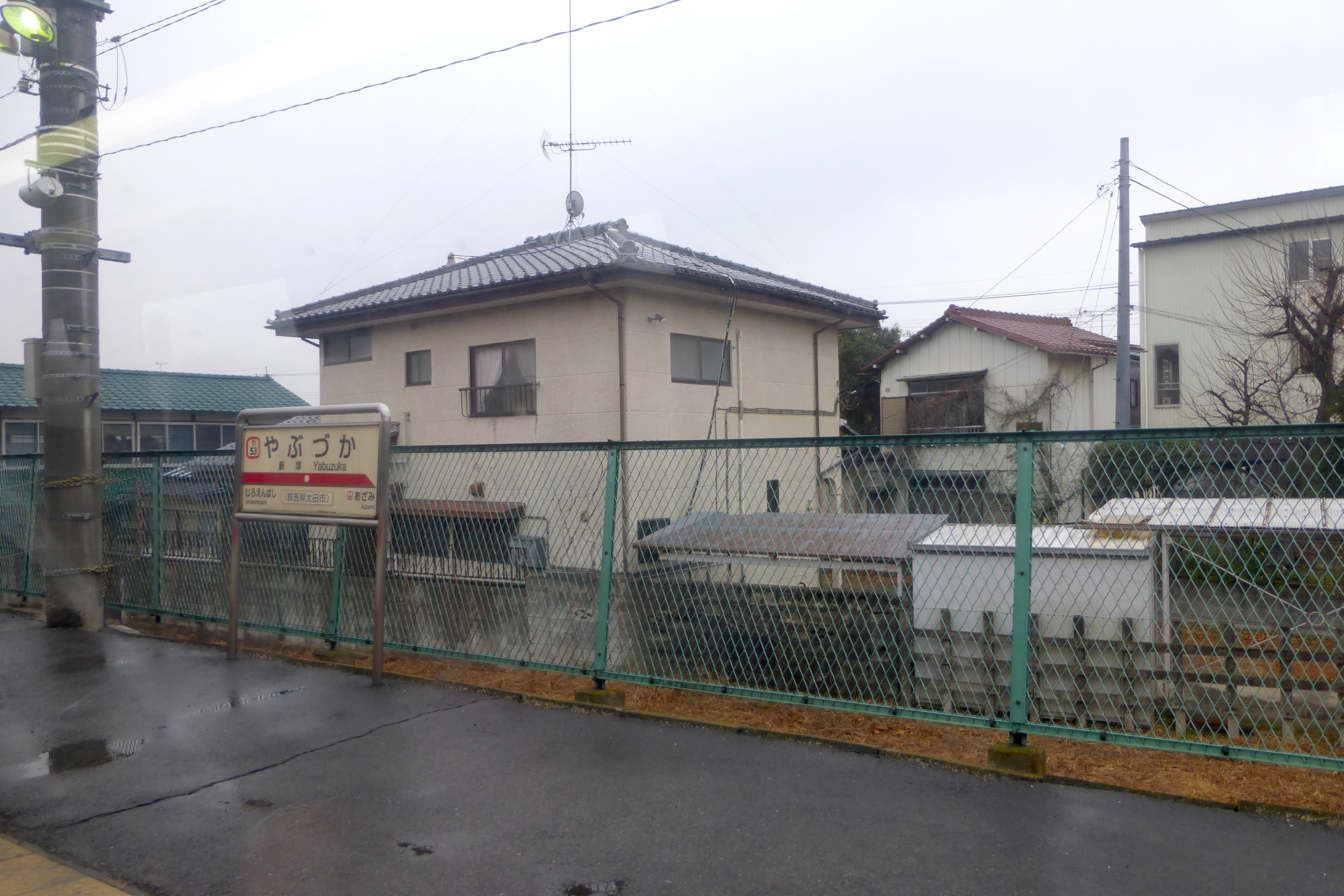
Station platform, 2015

The station consists of two ground-level side platforms, serving two tracks. Platform 2 is connected to the station building by a footbridge.

=== Platforms ===
1	■ Tōbu Kiryū Line	for Shin-Kiryū and Akagi
2	■ Tōbu Kiryū Line	for Ōta

== History ==
Yabuzaka Station opened on March 19, 1913.

From March 17, 2012, station numbering was introduced on all Tōbu lines, with Yabuzuka Station becoming "TI-53".

== Passenger statistics ==
In fiscal 2019, the station was used by an average of 1097 passengers daily (boarding passengers only).

== Surrounding area ==
- former Yabzuka Town Office
- Yabuzuka Main Post Office
- Yabuzuka onsen
