= Sammaibashi Station =

Railway station in Ōta, Gunma Prefecture, Japan

TI51 Sammaibashi Station 三枚橋駅
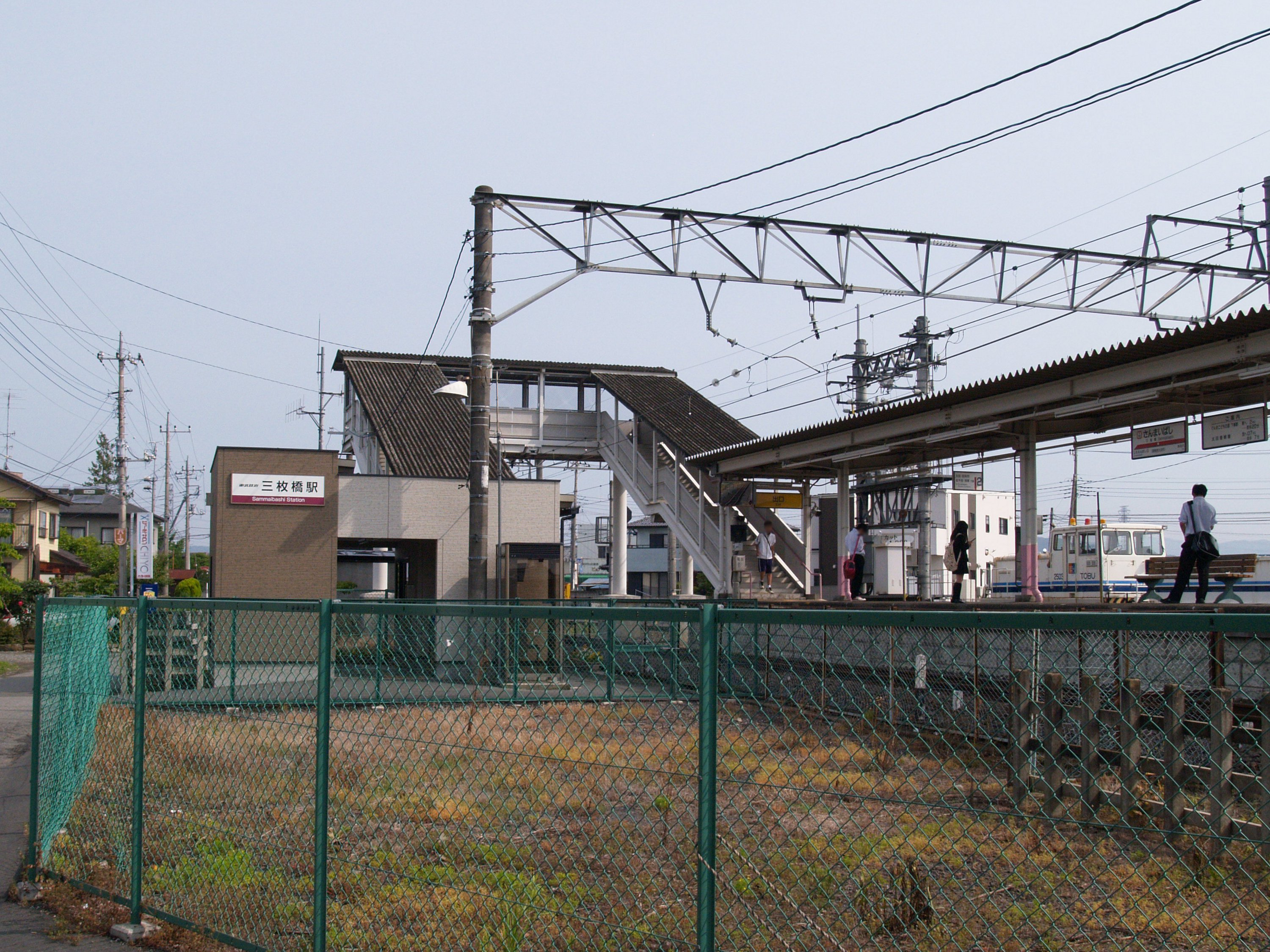
- Sammaibashi Station in June 2012

General information
- Location: 642-1 Karasuyama-shitamachi, Ōta-shi, Gunma-ken 373-0063; Japan
- Coordinates: 36.3132°N 139.3550°E
- Operator: Tōbu Railway
- Line: Tōbu Kiryū Line
- Distance: 3.4 km from Ōta
- Platforms: 1 island platform

Other information
- Station code: TI-51
- Website: Official website

History
- Opened: March 19, 1913

Passengers
- FY2019: 750 daily

Services
Preceding station	Tobu Railway	Following station
Ōta TI18 Terminus	Kiryū Line	Jiroembashi TI52 towards Akagi
Location
- Location within Gunma Prefecture Location within Japan

Sammaibashi Station (三枚橋駅, Sammaibashi-eki) is a passenger railway station in the city of Ōta, Gunma, Japan, operated by the private railway operator Tōbu Railway. It is numbered "TI-51".

== Lines ==
Sammaibashi Station is served by the Tōbu Kiryū Line, and is located 3.4 kilometers from the terminus of the line at Ōta.

== Station layout ==
The station consists of a single island platform connected to the station building by a footbridge.

=== Platforms ===
1	■ Tōbu Kiryū Line	for Shin-Kiryū and Akagi
2	■ Tōbu Kiryū Line	for Ōta

== History ==
Sammaibashi Station opened on March 19, 1913. A new station building was completed in 2009.

From March 17, 2012, station numbering was introduced on all Tōbu lines, with Sammaibashi Station becoming "TI-51".

== Passenger statistics ==
In fiscal 2019, the station was used by an average of 750 passengers daily (boarding passengers only).

== Surrounding area ==
- Gunma Komodo-no-kuni
- Ōta-Karaseyama Post Office
