= Yashū-Yamabe Station =

Railway station in Ashikaga, Tochigi Prefecture, Japan

TI16 Yashū-Yamabe Station 野州山辺駅
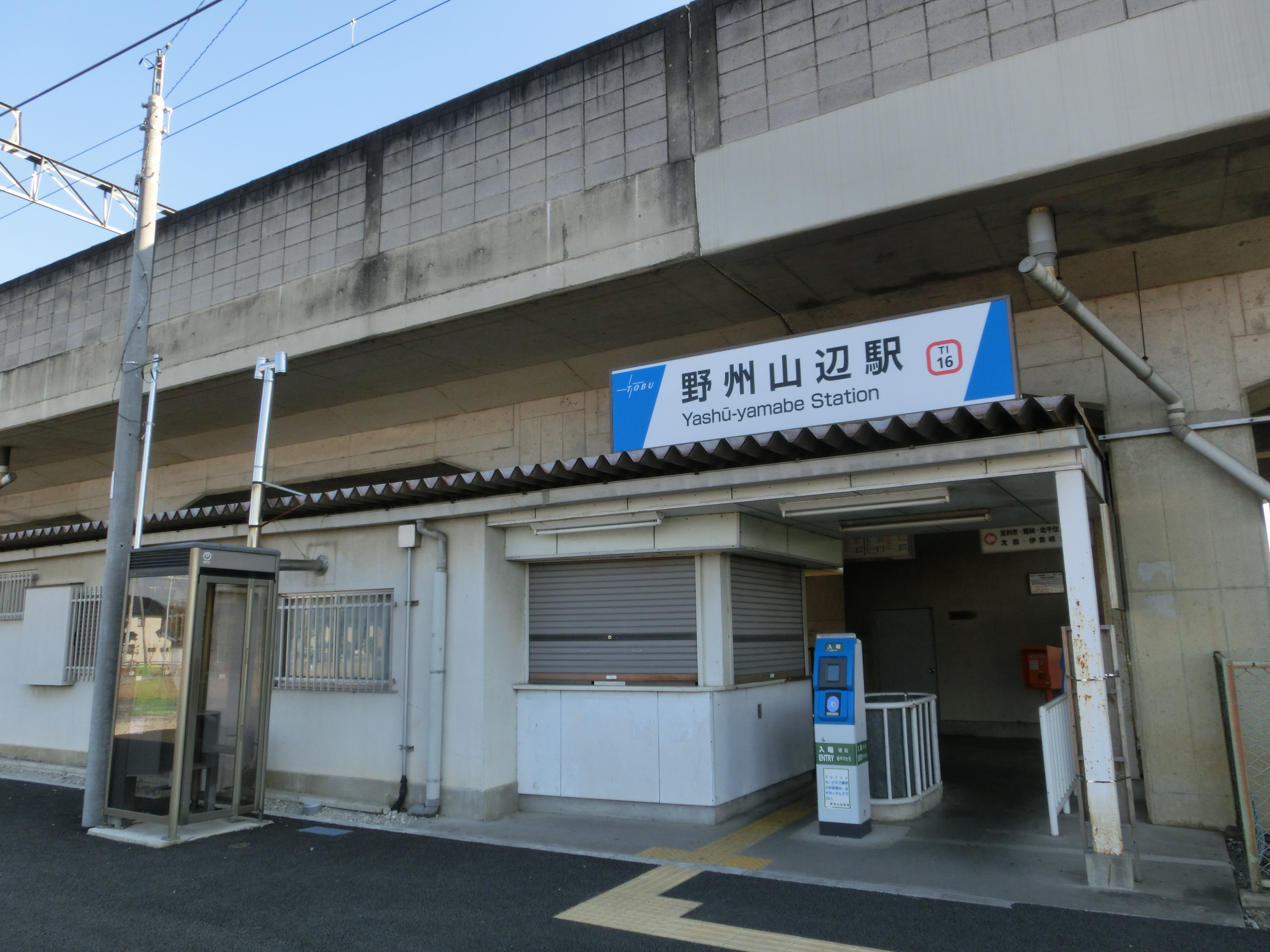
- Yashū-Yamabe Station entrance in December 2015

General information
- Location: Yawata-cho, Ashikaga-shi, Tochigi-ken 326-0824; Japan
- Coordinates: 36.3262°N 139.4322°E
- Operator: Tobu Railway
- Line: Tobu Isesaki Line
- Distance: 88.5 km from Asakusa
- Platforms: 1 island platform
- Tracks: 2

Other information
- Station code: TI-16
- Website: railway.tobu.co.jp/guide/station/info/1706.html

History
- Opened: 20 July 1925

Passengers
- FY2020: 895 daily

Services
Preceding station	Tobu Railway	Following station
Ashikagashi TI15 towards Tōbu-Dōbutsu-Kōen	Isesaki Line Local	Niragawa TI17 towards Isesaki
Location
- Location within Tochigi Prefecture Location within Japan

Yashū-Yamabe Station (野州山辺駅, Yashū-yamabe-eki) is a railway station in the city of Ashikaga, Tochigi, Japan, operated by the private railway operator Tōbu Railway.

== Lines ==
Yashū-Yamabe Station is served by the Tōbu Isesaki Line, and is located 88.5 km from the line's Tokyo terminus at Asakusa.

== Station layout ==
This station has a single elevated island platform with the station building underneath.

=== Platforms ===
1	■ Tōbu Isesaki Line	for Tatebayashi, Kuki, Kita-Senju, and Asakusa
2	■ Tōbu Isesaki Line	for Ōta

== History ==
Yashū-Yamabe Station opened on 20 July 1925.

From 17 March 2012, station numbering was introduced on all Tōbu lines, with Yashū-Yamabe Station becoming "TI-16".

== Passenger statistics ==
In fiscal 2019, the station was used by an average of 895 passengers daily (boarding passengers only).

== Surrounding area ==
- Ashikaga Yawata Post Office
- Shimotsuke Issha Hachiman-gu

== See also ==
- List of railway stations in Japan
