= Jiroembashi Station =

Railway station in Ōta, Gunma Prefecture, Japan

TI52 Jiroenbashi Station 治良門橋駅
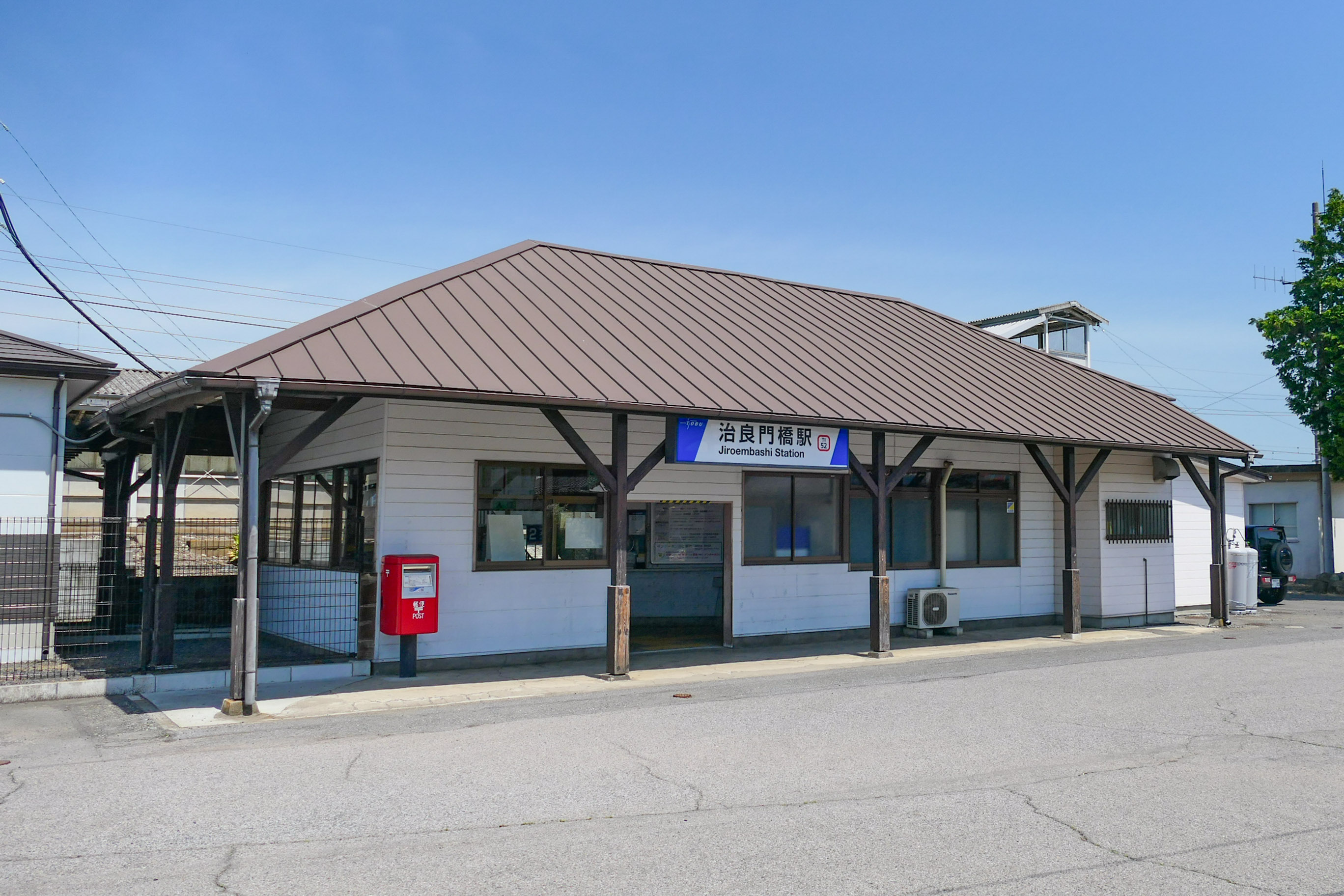
- Jiroenbashi Station in May 2025

General information
- Location: 1024 Narizukacho, Ōta-shi, Gunma-ken 373-0006; Japan
- Coordinates: 36.3331°N 139.3415°E
- Operator: Tōbu Railway
- Line: Tōbu Kiryū Line
- Distance: 5.9 km from Ōta
- Platforms: 2 side platforms

Other information
- Station code: TI-52
- Website: Official website

History
- Opened: March 19, 1913

Passengers
- FY2019: 544 daily

Services
Preceding station	Tobu Railway	Following station
Sammaibashi TI51 towards Ōta	Kiryū Line	Yabuzuka TI53 towards Akagi
Location
- Location within Gunma Prefecture Location within Japan

Jiroembashi Station (治良門橋駅, Jiroenbashi-eki) is a passenger railway station in the city of Ōta, Gunma, Japan, operated by the private railway operator Tōbu Railway. It is numbered TI-52.

== Lines ==
Jiroenbashi Station is served by the Tōbu Kiryū Line, and is located 5.9 kilometers from the terminus of the line at Ōta.

== Station layout ==
The station consists of two opposed side platforms connected to the station building by a footbridge.

=== Platforms ===
1	■ Tōbu Kiryū Line	for Shin-Kiryū and Akagi
2	■ Tōbu Kiryū Line	for Ōta

== History ==
Jiroenbashi Station opened on March 19, 1913.

From March 17, 2012, station numbering was introduced on all Tōbu lines, with Jiroenbashi Station becoming "TI-52".

== Passenger statistics ==
In fiscal 2019, the station was used by an average of 544 passengers daily (boarding passengers only).

== Surrounding area ==
- Godo Post Office
