= Otashi =

Otashi may refer to:

- 21328 Otashi - A minor planet
- Ota City or Ōta-shi in Gunma Prefecture, Japan
