= Niragawa Station =

Railway station in Ōta, Gunma Prefecture, Japan

TI17 Niragawa Station 韮川駅
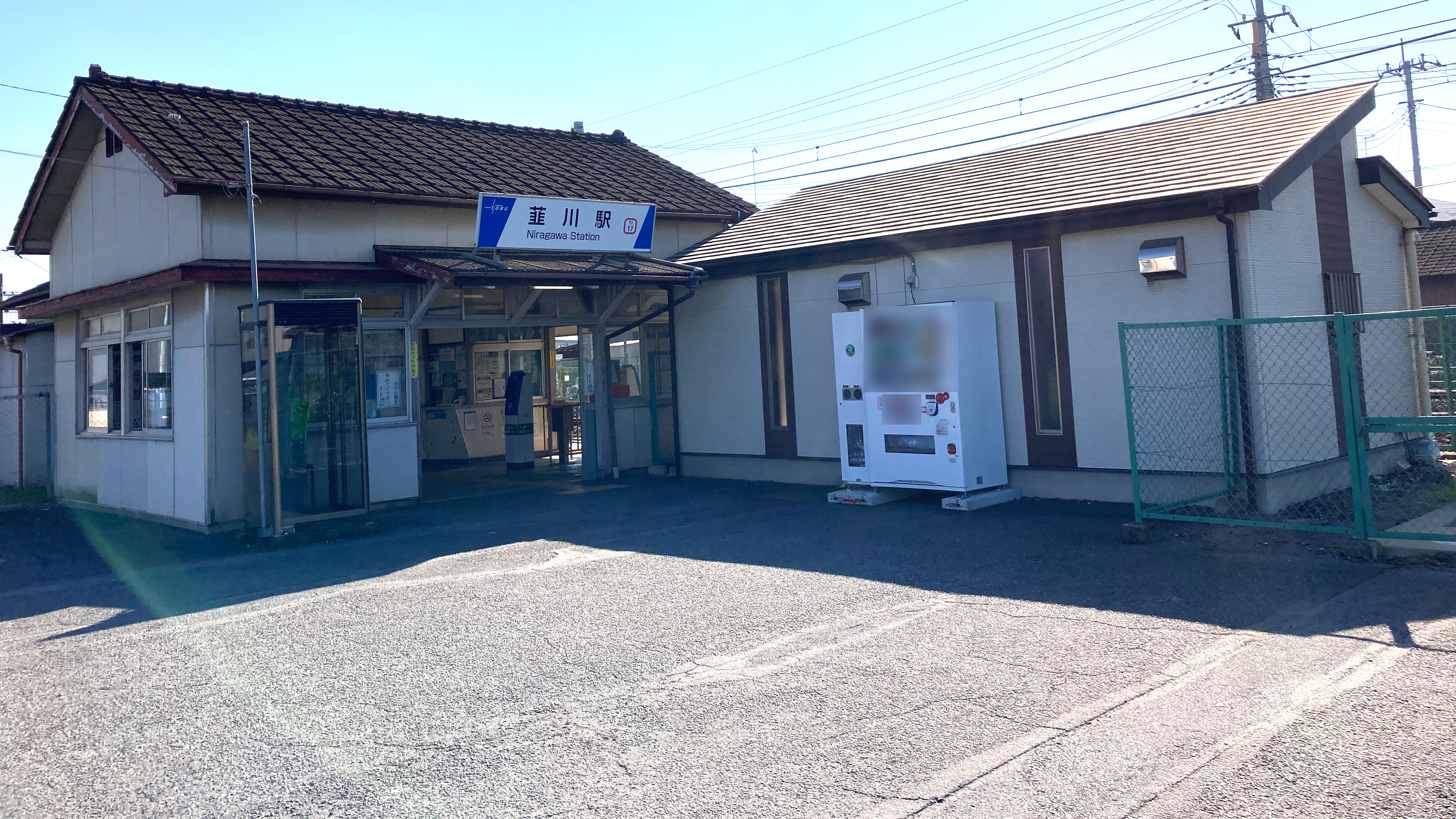
- Niragawa Station in September 2021

General information
- Location: Dainogo-cho 1098-2, Ōta-shi, Gunma-ken 373-0801; Japan
- Coordinates: 36.3081°N 139.4015°E
- Operator: Tōbu Railway
- Line: Tōbu Isesaki Line
- Distance: 91.8 km from Asakusa
- Platforms: 1 island platform

Other information
- Station code: TI-17
- Website: Official website

History
- Opened: 25 October 1932

Passengers
- FY2019: 2338 daily

Services
Preceding station	Tobu Railway	Following station
Yashū-Yamabe TI16 towards Tōbu-Dōbutsu-Kōen	Isesaki Line Local	Ōta TI18 towards Isesaki
Location
- Location within Gunma Prefecture Location within Japan

Niragawa Station (韮川駅, Niragawa-eki) is a passenger railway station in the city of Ōta, Gunma, Japan, operated by the private railway operator Tōbu Railway.

== Lines ==
Niragawa Station is served by the Tōbu Isesaki Line, and is located 91.8 kilometers from the terminus of the line at Asakusa.

== Station layout ==
The station consists of a single island platform, connected to the station building by a footbridge.

=== Platforms ===
1	■ Tōbu Isesaki Line	for Ōta
2	■ Tōbu Isesaki Line	for Tatebayashi

== History ==
Niragawa Station opened on 25 October 1932.

From 17 March 2012, station numbering was introduced on all Tōbu lines, with Niragawa Station becoming "TI-17".

== Passenger statistics ==
In fiscal 2019, the station was used by an average of 2338 passengers daily (boarding passengers only).

== Surrounding area ==
- Niragawa Post Office
