= Tōbu Kiryū Line =

Railway line in Gunma Prefecture, Japan

Kiryu Line

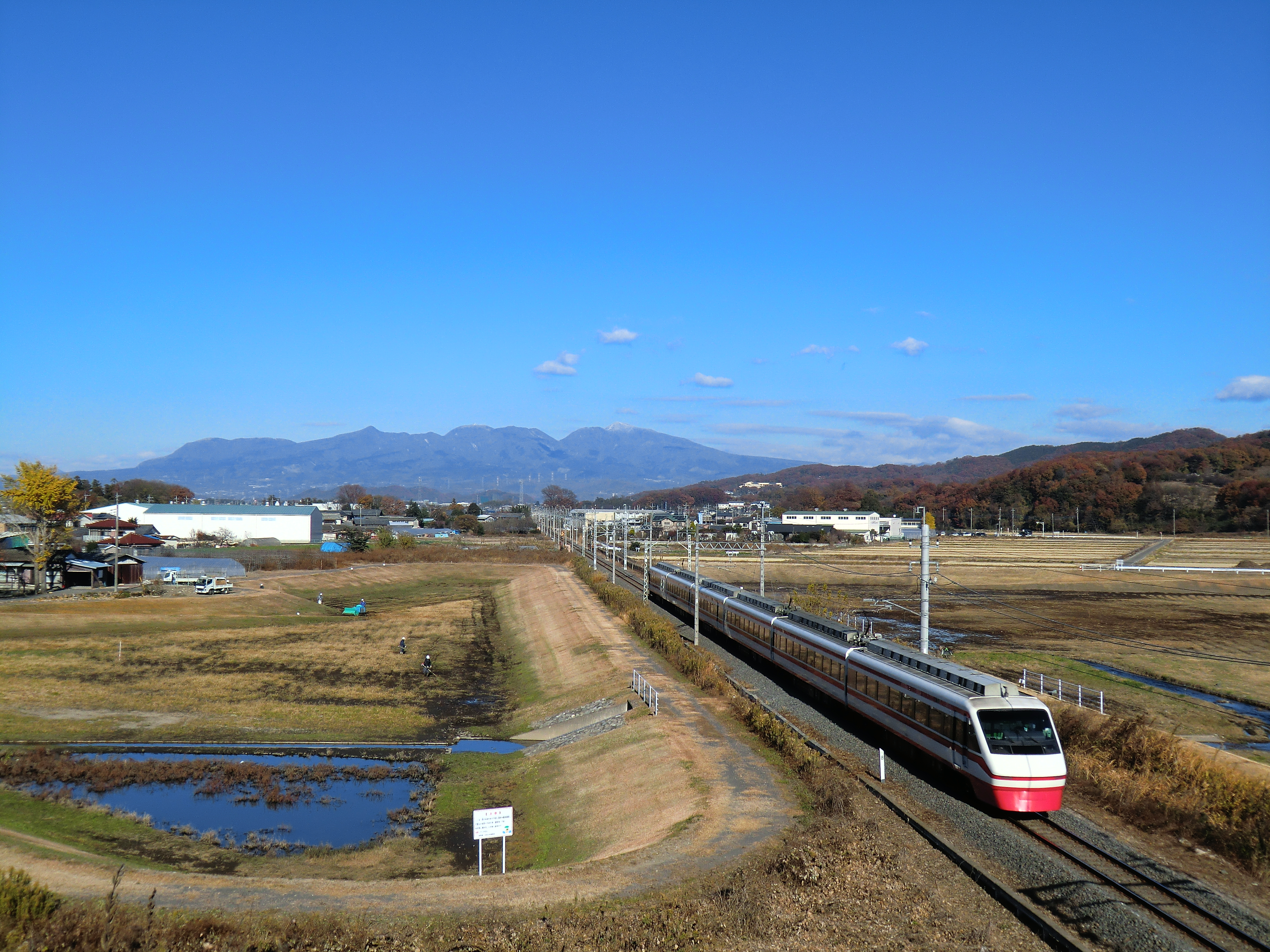
- A 200 series EMU on a Ryomo limited express service on the Kiryu Line in November 2013

Overview
- Native name: 桐生線
- Status: In service
- Owner: Tobu Railway Co., Ltd.
- Locale: Gunma Prefecture, Japan
- Termini: Ōta; Akagi
- Stations: 8

Service
- Type: Commuter rail
- System: Tobu Railway
- Route number: TI
- Operator(s): Tobu Railway Co., Ltd.

History
- Opened: May 1911; 114 years ago

Technical
- Line length: 20.3 km (12.6 mi)
- Track gauge: 1,067 mm (3 ft 6 in)
- Electrification: 1,500 V DC
- Operating speed: 90 km/h (55 mph)

The Kiryu Line (桐生線, Kiryū-sen) is a railway line in Japan operated by the major private railway operator Tobu Railway. The line is a 20.3 km (12.6 mi) branch off the Isesaki Line at Ōta Station, southbound to Akagi Station.

(video) Local train on the Tōbu Kiryū Line

== Operation ==
All trains stop at all stations on the line, including limited express Ryomo services to and from Asakusa in Tokyo.

== Stations ==
All stations are located in Gunma Prefecture. Limited express Ryomo stops at stations marked ● and passes stations marked │.

No.	Name	Japanese	Ryomo	Distance (km)	Between (km)	Transfers	Location
TI18	Ōta	太田	●	-	0.0	Isesaki Line (TI18); Koizumi Line (TI18)	Ōta
TI51	Sammaibashi	三枚橋	│	3.4	3.4		Ōta
TI52	Jiroembashi	治良門橋	│	2.5	5.9		Ōta
TI53	Yabuzuka	藪塚	●	3.8	9.7		Ōta
TI54	Azami	阿左美	│	3.4	13.1		Midori
TI55	Shin-kiryū	新桐生	●	1.5	14.6		Kiryū
TI56	Aioi	相老	●	2.3	16.9	■ Watarase Keikoku Line (WK03)	Kiryū
TI57	Akagi	赤城	●	3.4	20.3	Jōmō Line; ■ Watarase Keikoku Line (Ōmama: WK05)	Midori

== History ==
The Yabuzuka Quarry opened a 610 mm (2 ft) gauge handcar line between Ota and Yabuzuka in 1911 to haul stone blocks. The line was acquired by Tobu in March 1913, rebuilt to 1,067 mm (3 ft 6 in) gauge and extended to Aioi on 19 March 1913, operating using steam haulage. The line was electrified at 1,500 V DC from 1 March 1928, and in March 1932 extended to Akagi. Freight services ceased in 1996, with the last service running on 25 September.

== See also ==
- List of railway lines in Japan
