= Shin-Kiryū Station =

Railway station in Kiryū, Gunma Prefecture, Japan

TI55 Shin-Kiryū Station 新桐生駅
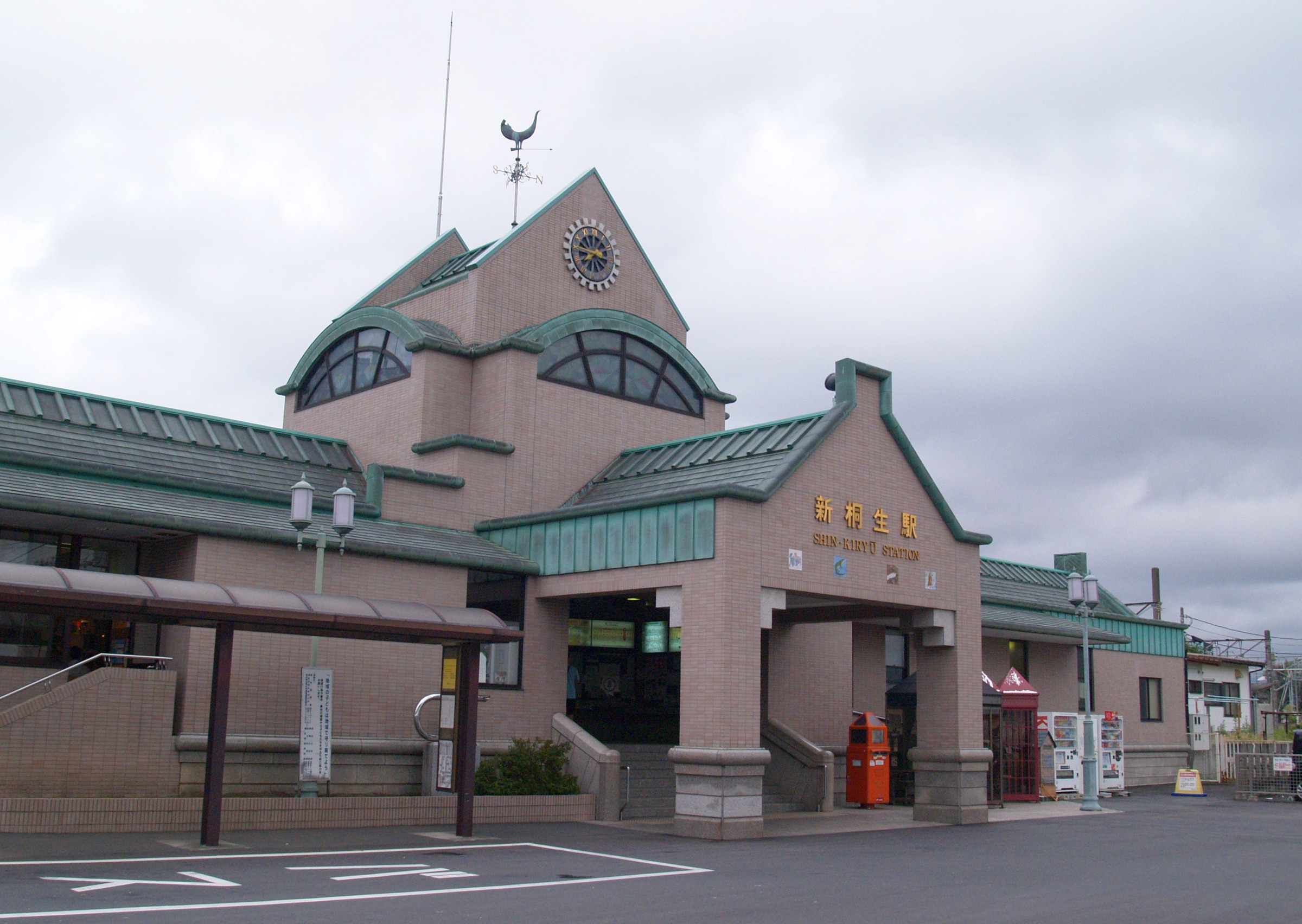
- Shin-Kiryū Station in September 2011

General information
- Location: Hirosawacho 2-2990-4, Kiryū-shi, Gunma-ken 376-0013; Japan
- Coordinates: 36.3952°N 139.3201°E
- Operator: Tōbu Railway
- Line: Tōbu Kiryū Line
- Distance: 14.6 km from Ōta
- Platforms: 1 side +1 island platform

Other information
- Station code: TI-55
- Website: Official website

History
- Opened: March 19, 1913

Passengers
- FY2019: 2204 daily

Services
Preceding station	Tobu Railway	Following station
Ōta TI53 towards Asakusa	Ryomo	Aioi TI56 towards Akagi
Azami TI54 towards Ōta	Kiryū Line	Aioi TI56 towards Akagi
Location
- Location within Gunma Prefecture Location within Japan

Shin-Kiryū Station (新桐生駅, Shin-Kiryū-eki) is a passenger railway station on the Tōbu Kiryū Line in the city of Kiryū, Gunma, Japan, operated by the private railway operator Tōbu Railway.

== Lines ==
Shin-Kiryū Station is a station on the Tōbu Kiryū Line, and is located 14.6 kilometers from the terminus of the line at Ōta.

== Station layout ==
The station has one side platform and one island platform connected to the station building by an underground passage.

=== Platforms ===
1	■ Tōbu Kiryū Line	for Ōta
2	■ Tōbu Kiryū Line	for Akagi
3	■ Tōbu Kiryū Line	not in normal use

== History ==
Shin-Kiryū Station was opened on March 19, 1913. A new station building was completed in 1988. From March 17, 2012, station numbering was introduced on all Tobu lines, with Shin-Kiryū Station becoming "TI-55".

== Passenger statistics ==
In fiscal 2019, the station was used by an average of 2204 passengers daily (boarding passengers only).

== Surrounding area ==
- Kiryū City Hall
- National Route 50
- National Route 122

== See also ==
- List of railway stations in Japan
