= Ōta, Gunma =

Ōta 太田市
- Special city
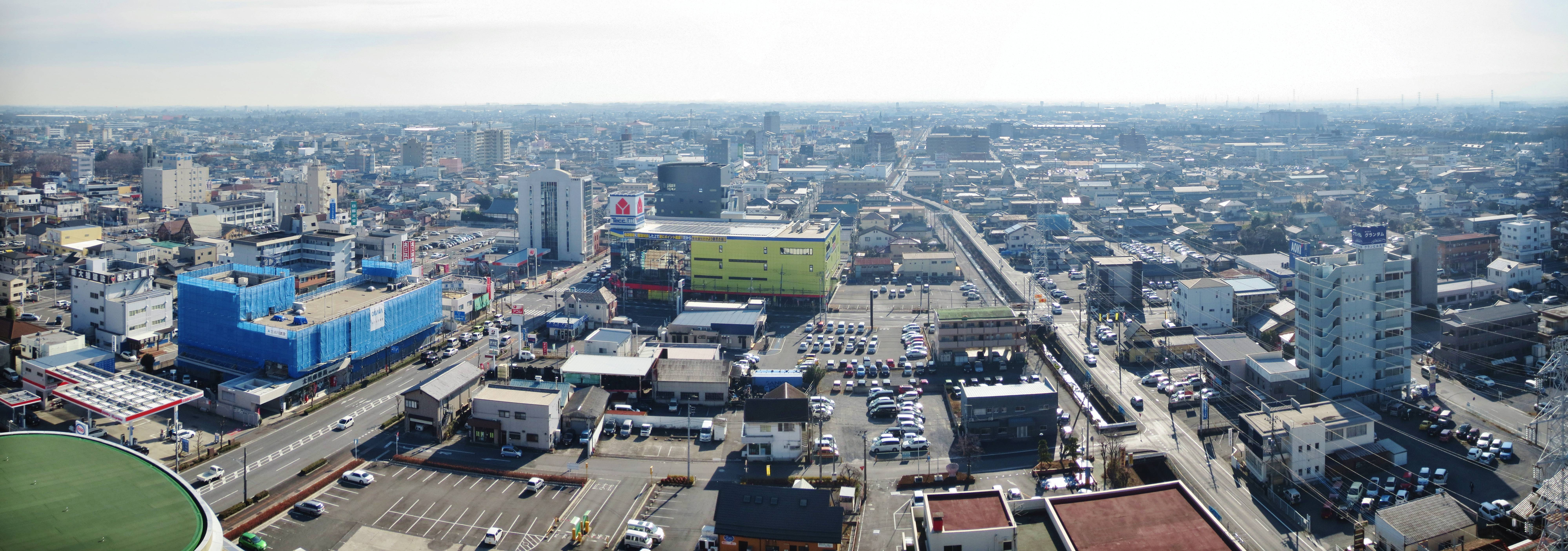
- View of downtown Ōta

- Flag Emblem

- Location of Ōta in Gunma Prefecture

- Coordinates: 36°17′28.1″N 139°22′31.4″E
- Country: Japan
- Region: Kantō
- Prefecture: Gunma
- First official recorded: 5th century AD
- City settled: May 3, 1948

Government
  - Mayor: Masayoshi Shimizu

Area
  - Total: 175.54 km^{2} (67.78 sq mi)

Population (August 2020)
  - Total: 224,358
  - Density: 1,278.1/km^{2} (3,310.3/sq mi)
- Time zone: UTC+9 (Japan Standard Time)
- Tree: Pine, Osmanthus, Maple, Ginkgo
- Flower: Chrysanthemum, Sage, Spring orchid, Azalea
- Phone number: 0276-47-1111
- Address: 2-35 Hama-cho, Ōta-shi, Gumma-ken 373-8718
- Website: Official website

Ōta (太田市, Ōta-shi; Japanese pronunciation: [ò̞ó̞.tä́(.ɕì), ó̞ó̞-]) is a city located in Gunma Prefecture, Japan. As of 31 August 2020, the city had an estimated population of 224,358 in 109,541 households, and a population density of 1300 persons per km^{2}. The total area of the city is 60.97 square kilometres (23.54 sq mi).

== Geography ==
Ōta is located in the extreme southeastern portion of Gunma Prefecture in the northern Kantō Plains, bordered by Tochigi Prefecture to the east and Saitama Prefecture to the south. The city is located 80 kilometres (50 mi) northwest of Tokyo between the Tone and Watarase rivers. It is located about 80 kilometers northwest of central Tokyo, about 30 kilometers east of the prefectural capital at Maebashi, about 40 kilometers east of Takasaki. The elevation of the city ranges from 30 to 40 meters in lowland in the south, southwest, northeast, and east, to 40–70 meters in the northwest.

=== Surrounding municipalities ===
Gunma Prefecture

- Isesaki
- Kiryū
- Midori
- Ōizumi
- Ōra

Tochigi Prefecture

- Ashikaga

Saitama Prefecture

- Fukaya
- Kumagaya

=== Climate ===
Ōta has a humid subtropical climate (Köppen Cfa) characterized by warm summers and cold winters with heavy snowfall. The average annual temperature in Ōta is 14.4 °C. The average annual rainfall is 1260 mm with September as the wettest month. The temperatures are highest on average in August, at around 26.7 °C, and lowest in January, at around 3.5 °C.

== Demographics ==
Per Japanese census data, the population of Ōta has increased steadily over the past 60 years.

Historical population
Year	Pop.	±%
1960	127,353	—
1970	141,491	+11.1%
1980	175,381	+24.0%
1990	197,139	+12.4%
2000	210,022	+6.5%
2010	216,465	+3.1%
2020	223,014	+3.0%

== History ==
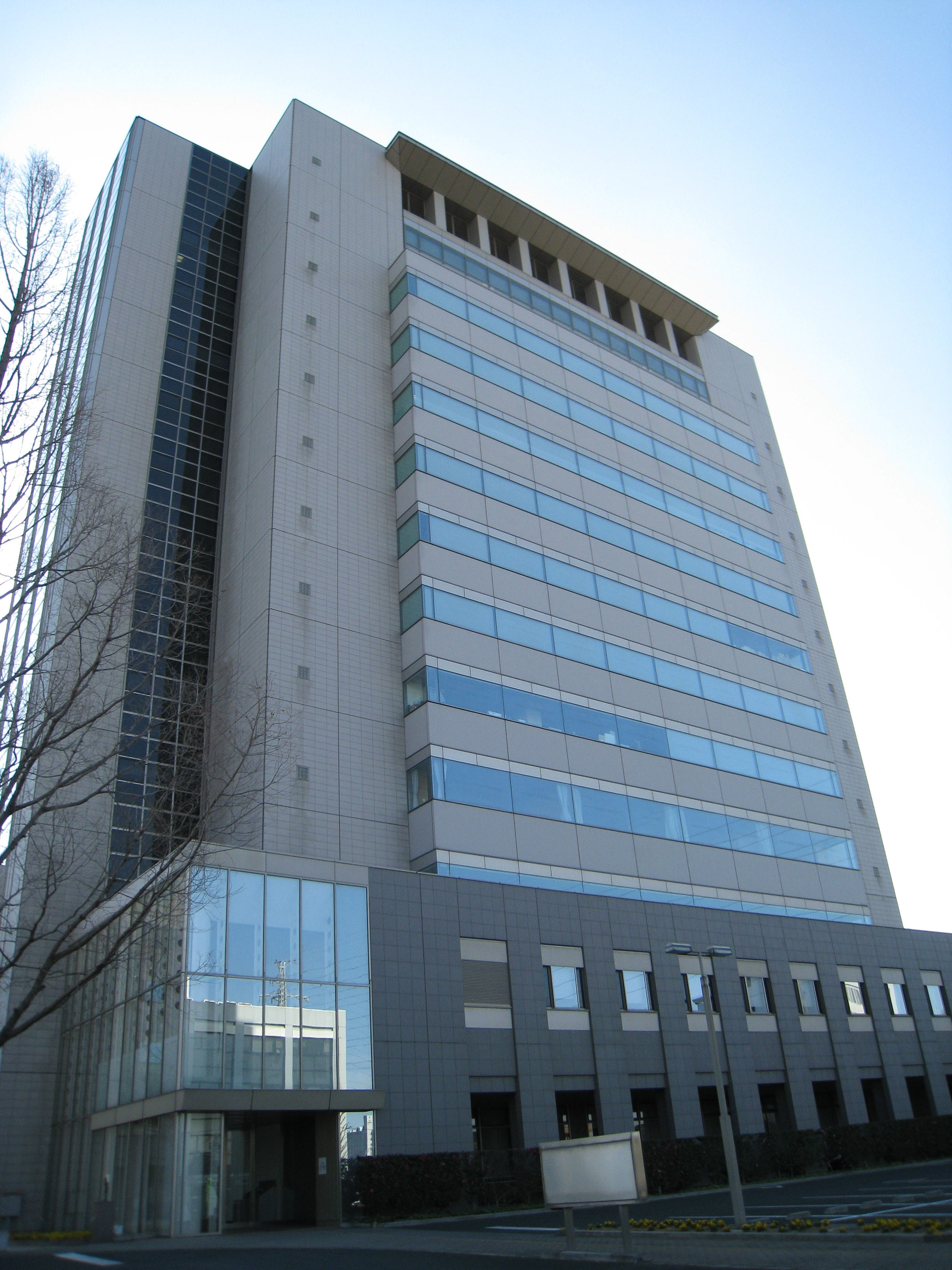
Ōta city hall

During the Edo period, the area of present-day Ōta contained two post towns on the Nikkō Reiheishi Kaidō, a subroute to Nikkō Kaidō which connected the Nakasendō directly with Nikkō, bypassing Edo, the Ōta-shuku (太田宿), (from which the city takes its name) and Kizaki-shuku (木崎宿).

Ōta Town was created within Nitta District, Gunma Prefecture on April 1, 1889, with the creation of the modern municipalities system after the Meiji Restoration. On April 1, 1940, Ōta merged with the villages of Kuai and Sawano from Nitta District, and with the village of Niragawa from Yamada District. On November 1, 1943, Ōta absorbed the village of Shimanogō, also from Nitta District. Ōta was elevated to city status on May 3, 1948. The city expanded on April 1, 1957, by annexing the village of Kyodo (from Nitta District), and the village of Kyūhaku (from Yamada District), and by annexing parts of the village of Yabakawa (Yamada District) on July 1, 1960. On April 1, 1963, Ōta absorbed the village of Hosen (Nitta District), followed by the village of Kesatoda (Yamada District) on December 1, 1963.

On March 28, 2005, the old city of Ōta absorbed the towns of Nitta, Ojima, and Yabuzukahon (all from Nitta District), and the area became the new city of Ōta. The former city of Ōta had a population of 152,000, with a total area of 97.96 km^{2}; after the merger the total area became 176.49 km^{2}, and the population went to 217,000 people. On April 1, 2007, Ōta was designated special city (tokureishi) with expanded local autonomy.

== Government ==
Ōta has a mayor-council form of government with a directly elected mayor and a unicameral city council of 30 members. Ōta contributes five members to the Gunma Prefectural Assembly. In terms of national politics, the city is part of Gunma 3rd district of the lower house of the Diet of Japan.

== Economy ==
During the years before World War II, airplane production by Nakajima Aircraft Company was the industrial mainstay of Ōta. After the war, much of the skills and technology used in the production of aircraft was redirected into the production of automobiles. Ōta's leading industry is manufacturing, centered in the southeast part of the city. Ōta leads the prefecture in manufacturing revenue, which exceeds ¥1.3 trillion annually. It is the home of the car manufacturer Subaru, a subsidiary of Subaru Corporation, formerly known as Fuji Heavy Industries, Ltd. (富士重工業株式会社, Fuji Jūkōgyō Kabushiki-gaisha; FHI) and Hino Motors. Subaru-chō is where the Subaru BRZ/Toyota 86 is built, having been re-purposed from kei car production, Yajima Plant is where all current Subaru cars are built, Otakita Plant is where commercial kei trucks are built (originally the location of Nakajima Aircraft), and Oizumi Plant is where engines and transmissions are built.

The northern part of Ōta is characterized by its farms, most of which produce rice. Also, Ōta is a major transportation hub in the Tomo (Eastern Gunma) region and the home of the Panasonic Wild Knights rugby team.

== Education ==
=== University ===
- Kanto Gakuen University

=== Primary and secondary schools ===
Ōta has 26 public elementary schools and 17 public middle schools operated by the city government, and seven public high schools operated by the Gunma Prefectural Board of Education. There is also one private high school and the Gunma Kokusai Academy, a private combined elementary/middle/high school which offers a curriculum in the English language. The prefecture also operates two special education schools for the handicapped.

=== International schools ===
- EAS Rede Pitágoras - Brazilian school - Formerly Colégio Pitágoras Brasil
- Escola Paralelo (エスコーラ・パラレロ 太田校) - Brazilian primary school

== Transportation ==
=== Railway ===
- Tōbu Railway – Isesaki Line
- Niragawa - Ōta - Hosoya - Kizaki - Serada

Tōbu Railway – Tōbu Kiryū Line

- Ōta - Sammaibashi - Jiroembashi - Yabuzuka

Tōbu Railway – Koizumi Line

- Ryūmai - Ōta

=== Highway ===
- Kita-Kantō Expressway – Ōta-Yabuzuka Interchange – Ōta-Gōdo Parking Area and Smart Interchange – Ōta-Kiryū Interchange
- National Route 17
- National Route 50
- National Route 122
- National Route 354
- National Route 407

== Local attractions ==
- Daikoin Temple - Founded in 1618 by Ieyasu Tokugawa. Popular with nickname Kosodate Donryu (meaning kid-raising Saint Donryu). Located 2.4 km northwest of the downtown.
- Kanayama Castle ruins - A Kamakura period castle on the top of Mt. Kanayama (244 m). Located 3.2 km north of the downtown. Mt. Kanayama is the symbol of Ota City. A National Historic Site
- Kōzuke Province Nitta District Offices Site - Nara period ruins, a National Historic Site
- Nitta-no-shō - sites and ruins associated with a Heian through Muromachi period manor, a National Historic Site
- Nyotaizan Kofun and Tenjinyama Kofun - Kofun period tumuli, a National Historic Sites
- Snake Center - Located in Yabuzuka Onsen area. Famous for collection of rare kinds of snakes.
- Tenjinyama Kofun - A large ancient burial mound (from around the 5th century). The haniwa unearthed in Ota are the only haniwa to be designated as national treasures, and are on display in the National Museum in Tokyo.
- Yabuzuka Onsen - Ōta's hot springs; 9.7 km northwest of the downtown.

== Sister cities ==
- Burbank, California, United States, since February 1984. Switching each year, the two cities send students to each other in order to strengthen relations and teach the next generation about the differing cultures.
- Lafayette, West Lafayette and Tippecanoe County, Indiana, United States, memorandum of understanding signed October 1988, agreement signed October 1993.
- Imabari, Ehime, Japan, since April 2002.

Ota entered into a friendship agreement with Yingkou, Liaoning, China in September 1987. The city has also commenced an exchange relationship with Guilin, in the Guangxi Zhuang Autonomous Region, China in 1997 and signed a friendship agreement with Hirosaki city, Aomori Prefecture in November 2006.

== Notable people ==
- Chiezō Kataoka, actor
- Mari Katayama, artist
- Rentarō Mikuni, actor
- Ayumi Morita, tennis player
- Chikuhei Nakajima, founder of Nakajima Aircraft, politician
- Onryo, professional wrestler
- Masaaki Ōsawa, politician
- Yuki Saito, professional baseball player
- Itsuki Shoda, professional baseball player
- Aya Uchida, voice actress
