= Ōta Station (Gunma) =

Railway station in Ōta, Gunma Prefecture, Japan

TI18 Ōta Station 太田駅
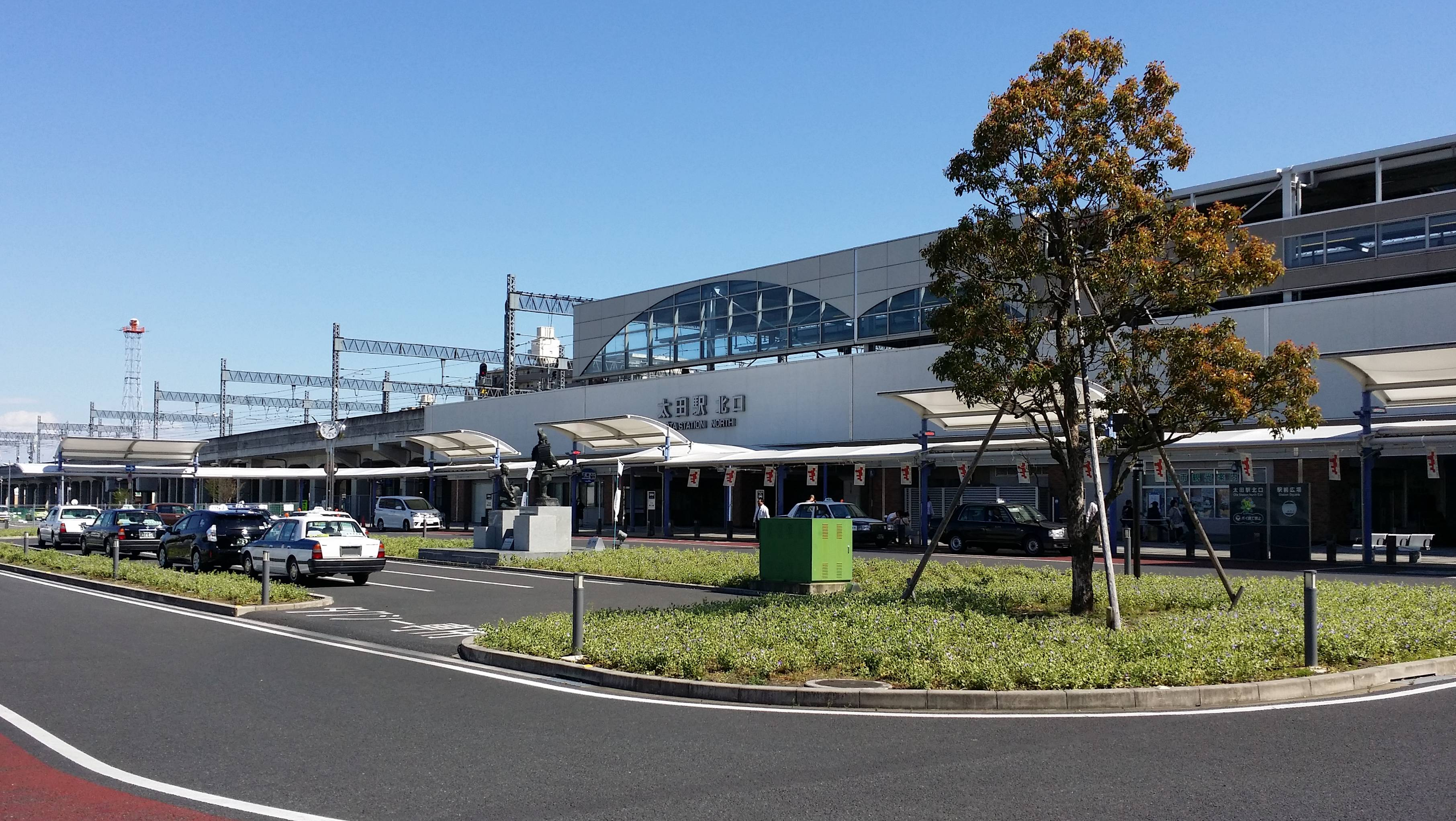
- Ōta Station north exit April 2017

General information
- Location: 16-1 Higashi-honchō, Ōta-shi, Gunma-ken 373–0026; Japan
- Coordinates: 36.2941°N 139.3790°E
- Operator: Tobu Railway
- Lines: Tobu Isesaki Line; Tōbu Kiryū Line; Tobu Koizumi Line
- Distance: 94.7 km from Asakusa
- Platforms: 3 island platforms

Other information
- Station code: TI-18
- Website: Official website

History
- Opened: 17 February 1909

Passengers
- FY2019: 11,705 daily

Services
Preceding station	Tobu Railway	Following station
Ashikagashi TI15 towards Asakusa	Ryomo	Kizaki TI20 towards Isesaki
Ashikagashi TI15 towards Asakusa	Ryomo	Yabuzuka TI53 towards Akagi
Niragawa TI17 towards Tōbu-Dōbutsu-Kōen	Isesaki Line Local	Hosoya TI19 towards Isesaki
through to Koizumi Line	Kiryū Line	Sammaibashi TI51 towards Akagi
Ryūmai TI47 towards Higashi-Koizumi	Koizumi Line (branch line)	through to Kiryū Line
Location
- Location within Gunma Prefecture Location within Japan

Track Layout

Ōta Station (太田駅, Ōta-eki) is a junction passenger railway station in the city of Ōta, Gunma, Japan, operated by the private railway operator Tōbu Railway.

== Lines ==
Ōta Station is served by the Tobu Isesaki Line, Tōbu Kiryū Line, and Tobu Koizumi Line, and is 94.7 km from the Tokyo terminus of the Isesaki Line at Asakusa. It is the terminus for the Koizumi Line and Kiryū Line.

== Station layout ==
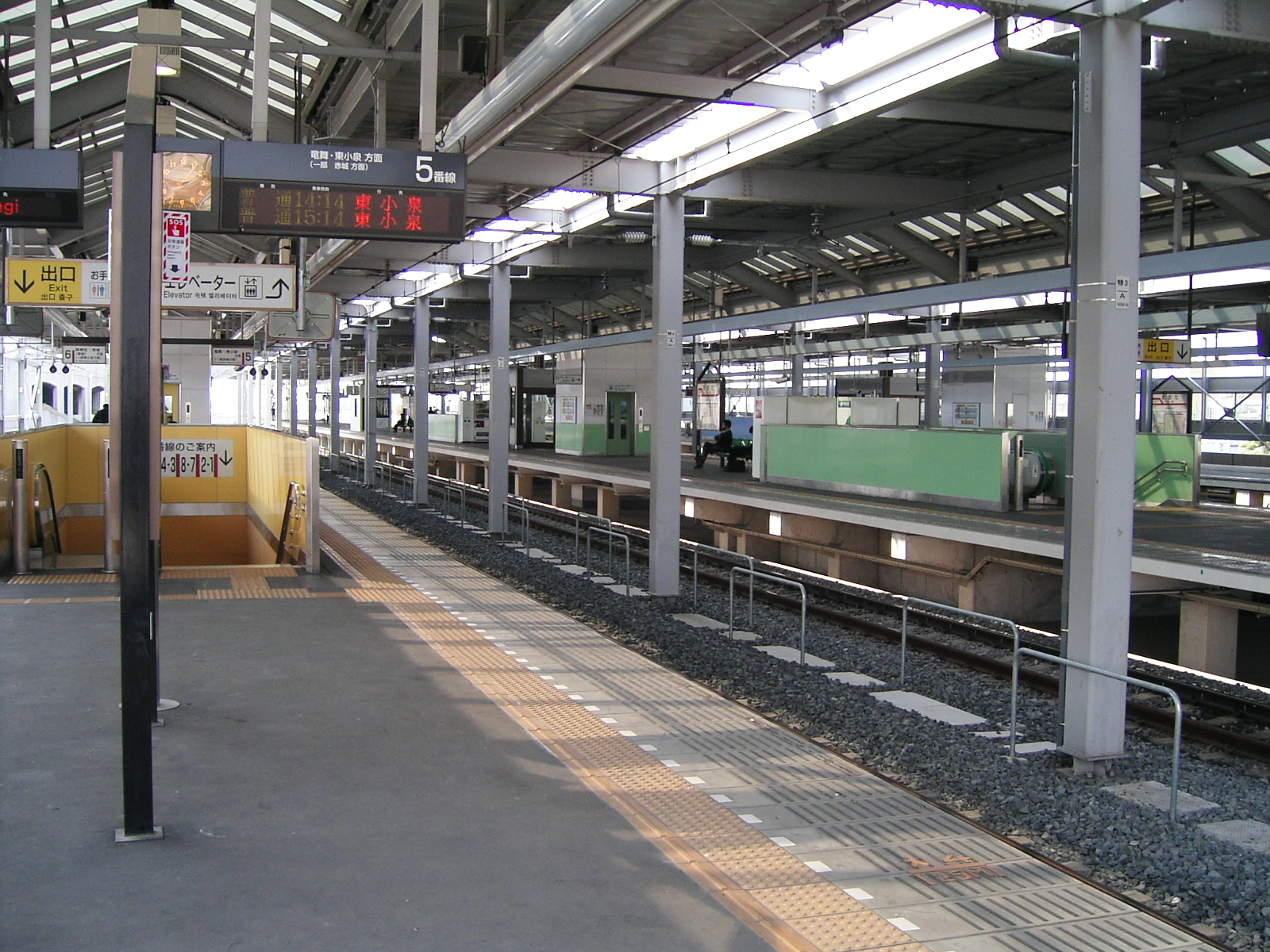
Platforms

The station consists of three elevated island platforms serving six tracks, with the station building located underneath. Platforms 7 and 8 are situated at the western end of platforms 1 and 2, and platforms 9 and 10 are situated at the western end of platforms 3 and 4 respectively.

== Platforms ==
Terminating services only	7	■	Isesaki Line	■	1	for Tatebayashi, Kuki, Tōbu-Dōbutsu-Kōen, Kasukabe, Kita-senju, and Asakusa
Kizaki, Sakaimachi, and Isesaki	8	■	Isesaki Line	■	2	for Tatebayashi, Kuki, Tōbu-Dōbutsu-Kōen, Kasukabe, Kita-senju, and Asakusa
Kizaki, Sakaimachi, Isesaki	9	■	Isesaki Line; Kiryū Line	■	3	for Tatebayashi, Kuki, Tōbu-Dōbutsu-Kōen, Kasukabe, Kita-senju, and Asakusa for Shin-kiryū and Akagi (Ltd. Express Ryōmō)
Kizaki, Sakaimachi, Isesaki	10	■	Isesaki Line; Kiryū Line	■	4	for Tatebayashi, Kuki, Tōbu-Dōbutsu-Kōen, Kasukabe, Kita-senju, and Asakusa for Shin-kiryū and Akagi (Ltd. Express Ryōmō)
			Koizumi Line	■	5	for Higashi-Koizumi
			Kiryū Line	■	6	for Shin-kiryū and Akagi (Local)

== History ==
The station opened as a station on the Isesaki Line on 17 February 1909. From 17 March 2012, station numbering was introduced on all Tobu lines, with Ōta Station becoming "TI-18".

== Passenger statistics ==
In fiscal 2019, the station was used by an average of 11,705 passengers daily (boarding passengers only).

== Surrounding area ==
- Mount Kanayama
- Kanayama Castle
- Daikōin Temple
- Takayama Shrine
- Gunma University Ōta campus
- Fuji Heavy Industries (former Nakajima Aircraft Company plant before World War II)

== See also ==
- List of railway stations in Japan
