= Akagi Station (Gunma) =

Railway station in Midori, Gunma Prefecture, Japan

TI57 Akagi Station 赤城駅
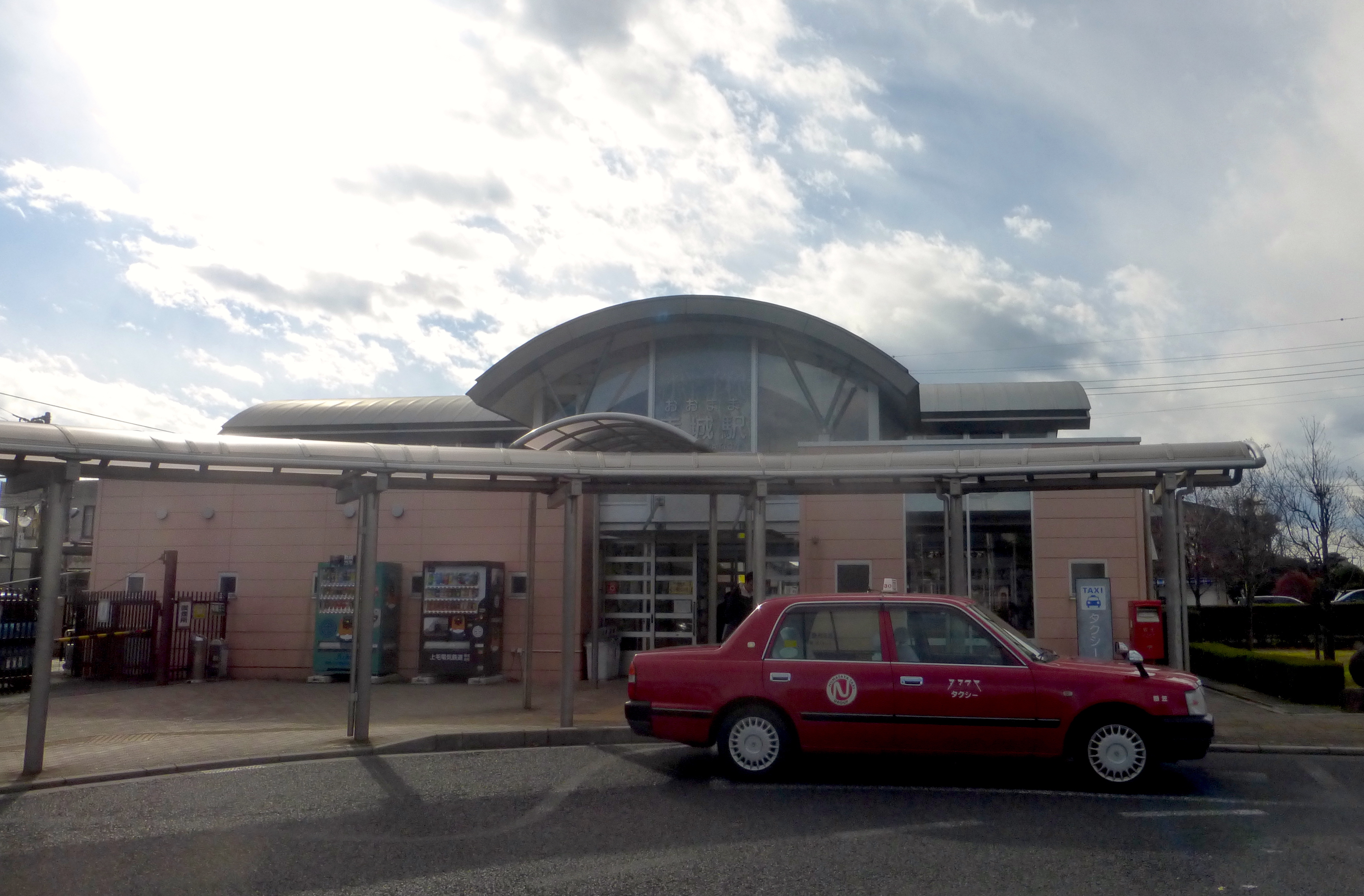
- Akagi Station, November 2017

General information
- Location: 2445-3 Ōmama, Ōmama-chō, Midori-shi, Gunma-ken 376–0101; Japan
- Coordinates: 36.4255°N 139.2769°E
- Operator: Tōbu Railway; Jōmō Electric Railway Company
- Line: Tōbu Kiryū Line ■ Jōmō Line
- Distance: 14.6 km from Ōta
- Platforms: 1 island + 1 bay platform

Other information
- Station code: TI-57

History
- Opened: 10 November 1928
- Former names: Shin-Ōmama (until 1958)

Passengers
- FY2019: 1201 (Tōbu)

Services
Preceding station	Tobu Railway	Following station
Terminus	Ryomo	Aioi TI56 towards Asakusa
Terminus	Kiryū Line	Aioi TI56 towards Ōta
Preceding station	Jōmō Electric Railway	Following station
Higashi-Nikkawa towards Chūō-Maebashi	Jōmō Line	Kiryū-Kyūjō-Mae towards Nishi-Kiryū
Location
- Location within Gunma Prefecture Location within Japan

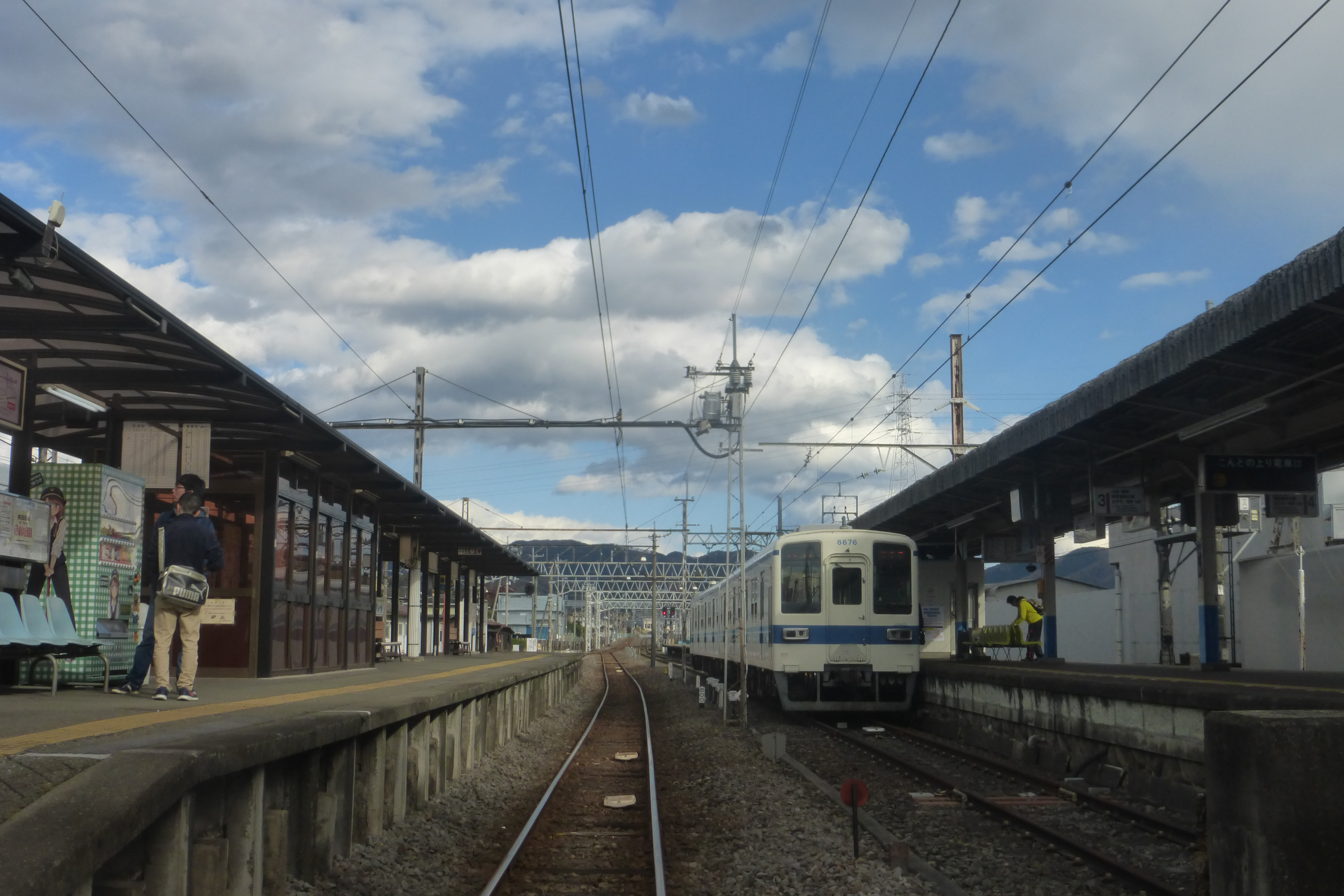
Platforms, 2017

Akagi Station (赤城駅, Akagi-eki) is a passenger railway station in the city of Midori, Gunma, Japan, operated by the private railway operators Tōbu Railway and the Jōmō Electric Railway.

== Lines ==
Akagi Station is a terminal station of the Tōbu Kiryū Line, and is located 20.3 kilometers from the opposing terminal of the line at Ōta. It is also a station for the Jōmō Line and is 19.6 kilometers from the starting point of that line at Chūō-Maebashi.

== Station layout ==
Akagi Station has one island platform for the Jōmō Line and one bay platform serving two tracks for the Tōbu Kiryū Line, with both sets of platforms elevated with the station building underneath. Both companies share the same set of ticket barriers.

=== Platforms ===
1	■ Jōmō Line	for Nishi-Kiryū
2	■ Jōmō Line	for Chūō-Maebashi and Okaya
3/4	■ Tōbu Kiryū Line	for Ōta, Tōbu-Dōbutsu-Kōen, Kita-Senju, and Asakusa

== History ==
The station opened on 10 November 1928 as Shin-Ōmama Station (新大間々駅) on the Jōmō Line. The Tōbu Railway station opened on 18 March 1932. The station was renamed Akagi Station on 1 November 1958.

From 17 March 2012, station numbering was introduced on all Tōbu lines, with Akagi Station becoming "TI-57".

== Passenger statistics ==
In fiscal 2019, the Tōbu station was used by an average of 1201 passengers daily (boarding passengers only).

== Surrounding area ==
- Former Ōmama town hall
- Ōmama Post Office
- Ōmama-Minami Elementary School

== See also ==
- List of railway stations in Japan
