= Yōga, Tokyo =

Neighborhood in Setagaya, Tokyo, Japan

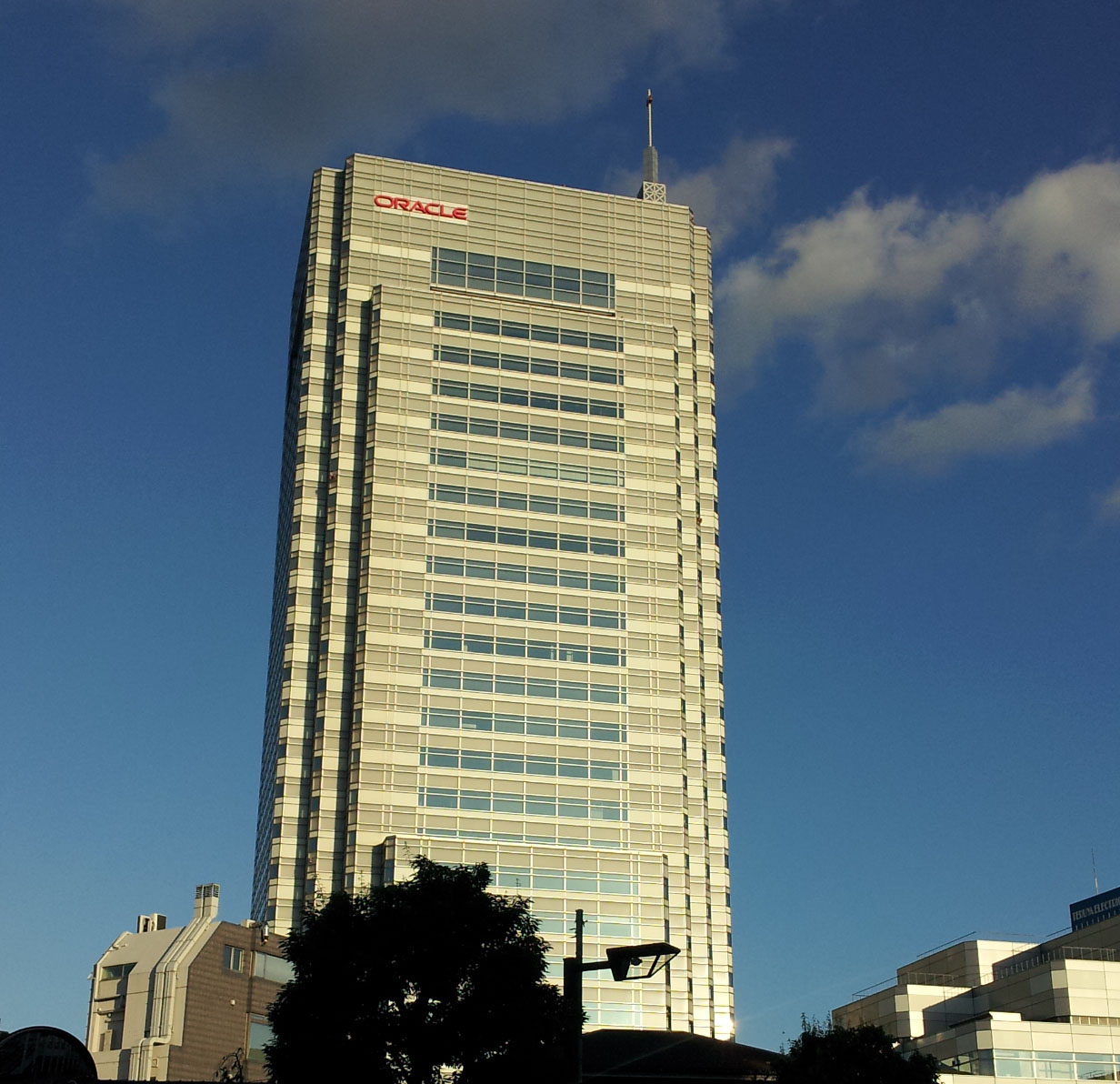
Setagaya Business Square

Yōga (用賀, Yōga) is a neighborhood in Setagaya, Tokyo. Its name appears frequently in traffic reports because the junction between the Tōmei Expressway and the elevated Shibuya branch (#3) of the Metropolitan Expressway system is there. There is also a stop, Yōga Station, on the Tōkyū Den-en-toshi line here. There is also a bus services (Tōkyū Bus) and possible access to the area with numbers of buses.

Two traffic cameras on top of the SBS tower overlook the junction, the Yōga toll gate, and other parts of the neighborhood.

== History ==
In the Edo period, Yōga was a post-town on the Ōyama Kaidō, a road connecting Edo and Ōyama Mountain in Sagami Province.

== Derivation ==
The name comes from Sanskrit root of the word "yoga". The Buddhist temple Shinpuku-ji chose the Sanskrit-derived appellation Yuga-san. The Sanskrit is also the root of the word "yoga" (योग→瑜伽→用賀).

== Culture ==
Yōga is home to Kinuta Park, a broad green space established in 1957. The park is located 10 minutes from the Yōga Station and covers 39 hectares (96 acres). Kinuta Park has sports facilities, including baseball fields, a basketball court, and swimming pools (25m and 50m, also a small pool for kids and diving pool). The Setagaya Art Museum, est. 1986, is located on a corner of Kinuta Park. The museum has a permanent collection with an emphasis on photography, particularly the works of Kineo Kuwabara and Kōji Morooka.

Yōga is noted for its educational institutions, and is home to many primary, junior, and high schools. Perhaps the most significant of them all is Sakuramachi State Primary, which had biggest numbers of pupils in Setagaya-ku back in 1992–93 with more than 600 pupils. Yōga is also home to the all-girls Catholic Seisen International School.

== Neighborhood ==
Around the Yōga Station is perhaps the most vibrant area of Yōga. It is a residential area after all and there are numbers of residential friendly facilities including large super markets (OK Store and Fuji supermarket) as well as smaller grocery stores, butcher, off-licence, fish shops, etc.

== Education ==
Setagaya Board of Education operates public elementary and junior high schools.

1 and 2-chōme are zoned to Sakuramachi Elementary School (桜町小学校). 3 and 4-chōme are zoned to Kyōsai Elementary School (京西小学校) and Yōga Junior High School (用賀中学校). Different parts of 1 and 2-chōme are each zoned to Fukasawa Junior High School (深沢中学校) and Seta Junior High School (瀬田中学校). There is also international school such as MITA International School.
