= Hanasaki Station (Saitama) =

Railway station in Kazo, Saitama Prefecture, Japan

TI04 Hanasaki Station 花崎駅
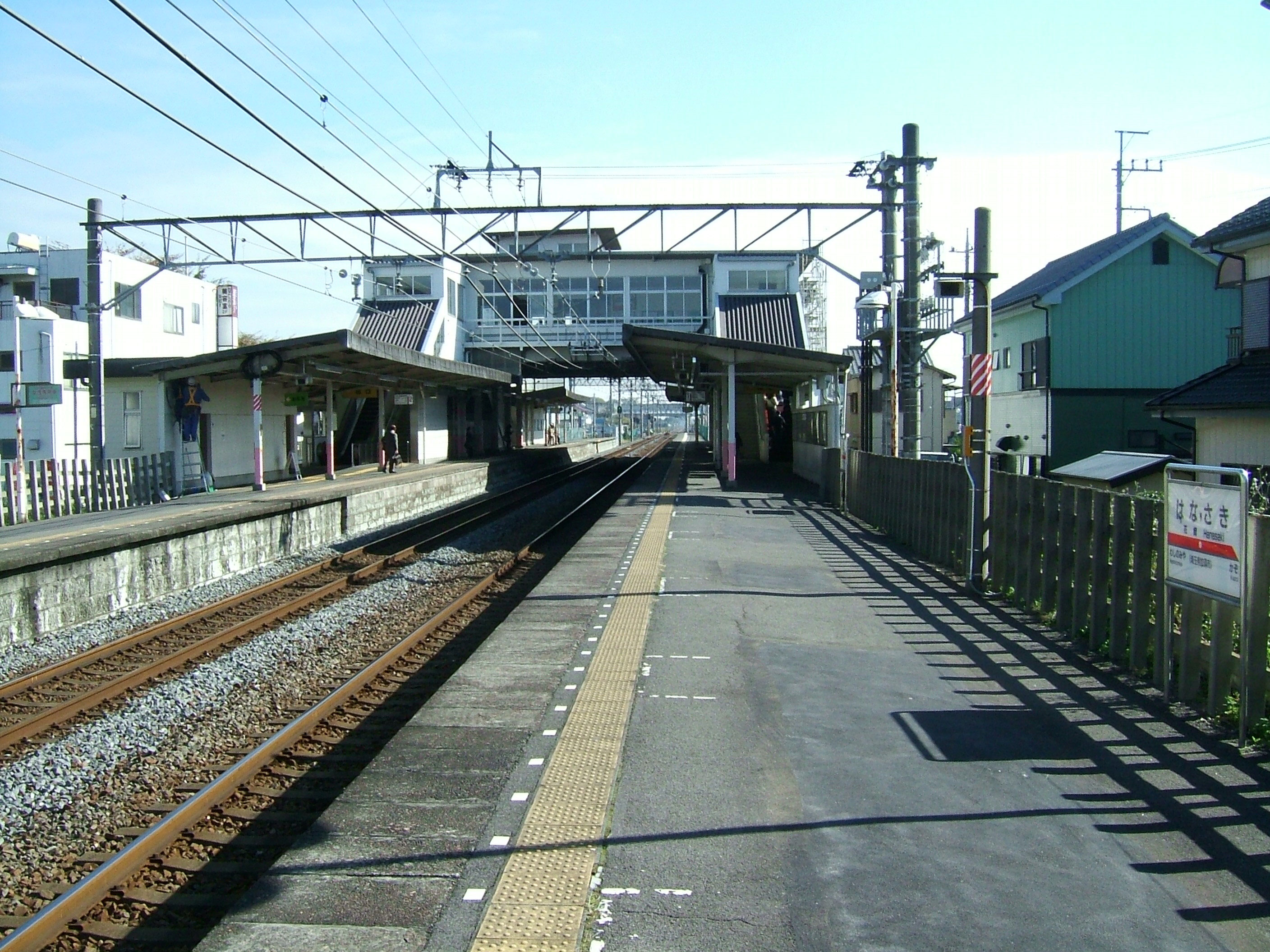
- Hanasaki Station platforms, November 2008

General information
- Location: Hanasaki, Kazo-shi, Saitama-ken 347-0032; Japan
- Coordinates: 36.1098°N 139.6334°E
- Operator: Tōbu Railway
- Line: Tōbu Isesaki Line
- Distance: 54.8 km from Asakusa
- Platforms: 2 side platforms

Other information
- Station code: TI-04
- Website: Official website

History
- Opened: 1 April 1927

Passengers
- FY2019: 10,682 daily

Services
Preceding station	Tobu Railway	Following station
Washinomiya TI03 towards Tōbu-Dōbutsu-Kōen	Isesaki Line Section Express Section Semi Express	Kazo TI05 towards Tatebayashi
Washinomiya TI03 towards Tōbu-Dōbutsu-Kōen	Isesaki Line Local	Kazo TI05 towards Isesaki
Location
- Location within Saitama Prefecture Location within Japan

Hanasaki Station (花崎駅, Hanasaki-eki) is a passenger railway station located in the city of Kazo, Saitama, Japan, operated by the private railway operator Tōbu Railway.

== Lines ==
Hanasaki Station is served by the Tōbu Isesaki Line, and is located 54.8 km from the Tokyo terminus at Asakusa

== Station layout ==
This station has an elevated station building, with two opposed side platforms serving two tracks located on the ground level.

=== Platforms ===
1	■ Tōbu Isesaki Line	for Tatebayashi, Ashikagashi, and Ōta
2	■ Tōbu Isesaki Line	for Kuki, Tōbu-Dōbutsu-Kōen, Kasukabe, Kita-Senju, and Asakusa

== History ==
Hanasaki Station opened on 1 April 1927.

From 17 March 2012, station numbering was introduced on all Tōbu lines, with Hanasaki Station becoming "TI-04".

== Passenger statistics ==
In fiscal 2019, the station was used by an average of 10,682 passengers daily.

== Surrounding area ==
- Hanasaki Ekimae Post Office
- Satoe Memorial Art Museum of 21st Century
- Heisei International University
- Hanasaki Tokuharu High School
