= Kurohama shell mound =

Japanese archaeological site

- 黒浜貝塚 (Japanese)
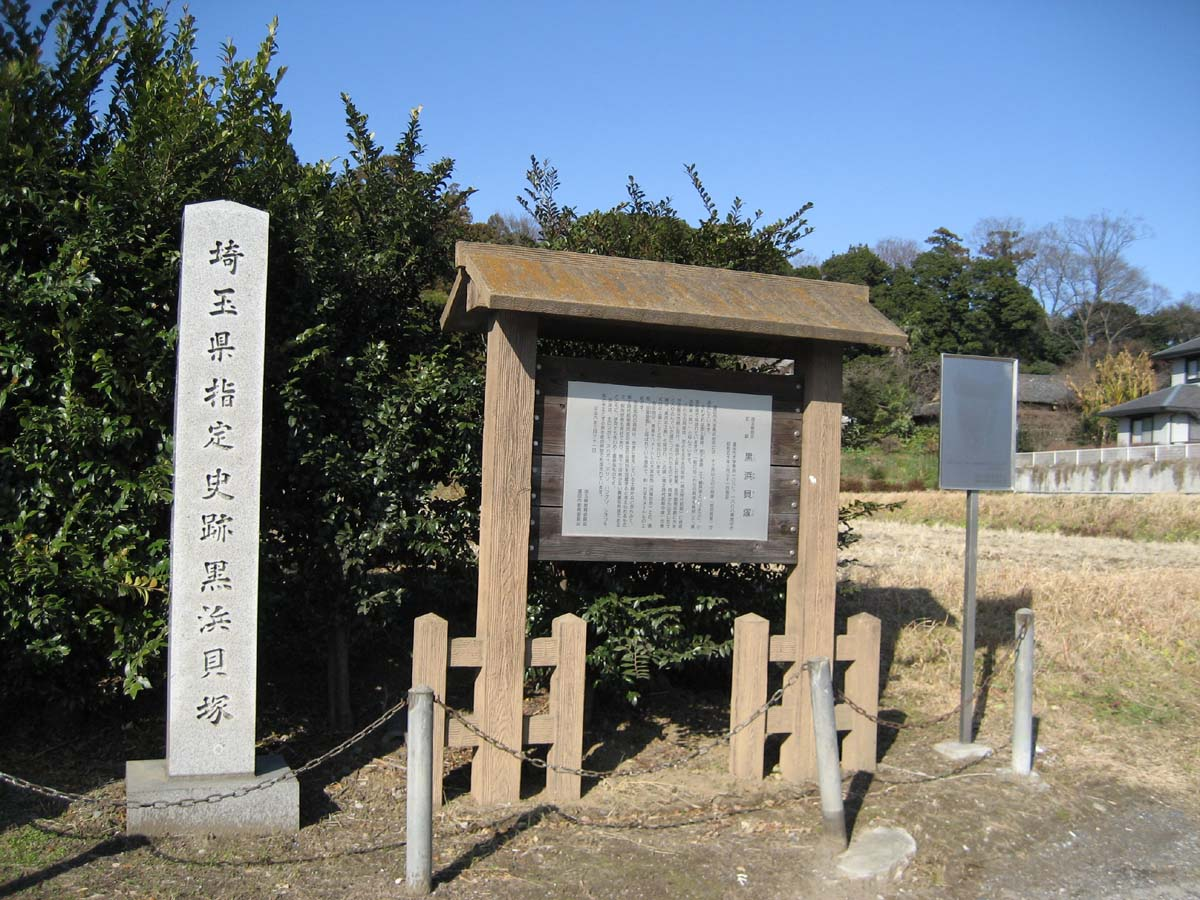
- Kurohama shell mound

- Kurohama shell mound Kurohama shell mound (Japan)
- 35°59′32.3″N 139°39′44.5″E
- Type: shell midden, settlement
- Periods: early Jōmon period
- Location: Hasuda, Saitama, Japan
- Region: Kantō region

Site notes
- Public access: Yes (park and museum)

The Kurohama shell mound (黒浜貝塚, Kurohama kaizuka) is an archaeological site in the Kurohama neighborhood of the city of Hasuda, Saitama Prefecture, in the Kantō region of Japan containing a Jōmon period shell midden and settlement ruin. The site was designated a National Historic Site of Japan in 2006.

== Overview ==
During the early to middle Jōmon period (approximately 4000 to 2500 BC), sea levels were five to six meters higher than at present, and the ambient temperature was also 2 C higher. During this period, the Kantō region was inhabited by the Jōmon people, many of whom lived in coastal settlements. The middens associated with such settlements contain bone, botanical material, mollusc shells, sherds, lithics, and other artifacts and ecofacts associated with the now-vanished inhabitants, and these features, provide a useful source into the diets and habits of Jōmon society. Most of these middens are found along the Pacific coast of Japan.

The Kurohama shell mound is located on a tongue-shaped plateau with an elevation of about 14 to 16 meters above the present day sea level in the Omiya Plateau in the eastern part of Saitama. Although the area is now a considerable distance inland from the coast of Tokyo Bay, during the Jōmon period it was a peninsula on a long inlet of the sea. The existence of shell mounds in this area has been known for a long time, and after archaeological excavations in 1913 and 1931 this became a type site for a style of early Jōmon pottery called "Kurohama style earthenware", which is distributed mainly in the Kantō region. As a result of a confirmation survey conducted in 1971 in conjunction with a highway expansion project, it was found that the settlement extended for 150 meters from east-to-west by 95 meters from north-to-south, with over 51 pit dwellings constructed in a ring around a central plaza measuring 50 by 40 meters. The 13 shell middens at the site were small and contained oysters, hamaguri, and brackish-watered Yamato-shjimi. Other excavated relics include earthenware, stone tools, bone horns, and pin earrings, which date the site to approximately 6000 years ago. The site was designated a Saitama Prefectural Historic Site in 1975, and was made a National Historic Site in 2006.

The Kurohama shell mound is a five-minute walk from the "Hasuda City Hall" bus stop on the Asahi Bus from JR East Utsunomiya Station Hasuda Station.

== See also ==
- List of Historic Sites of Japan (Saitama)
