= Sakura-shimmachi Station =

Railway station in Tokyo, Japan

Coordinates: 35.6314°N 139.6449°E

Sakura-shimmachi Station 桜新町駅

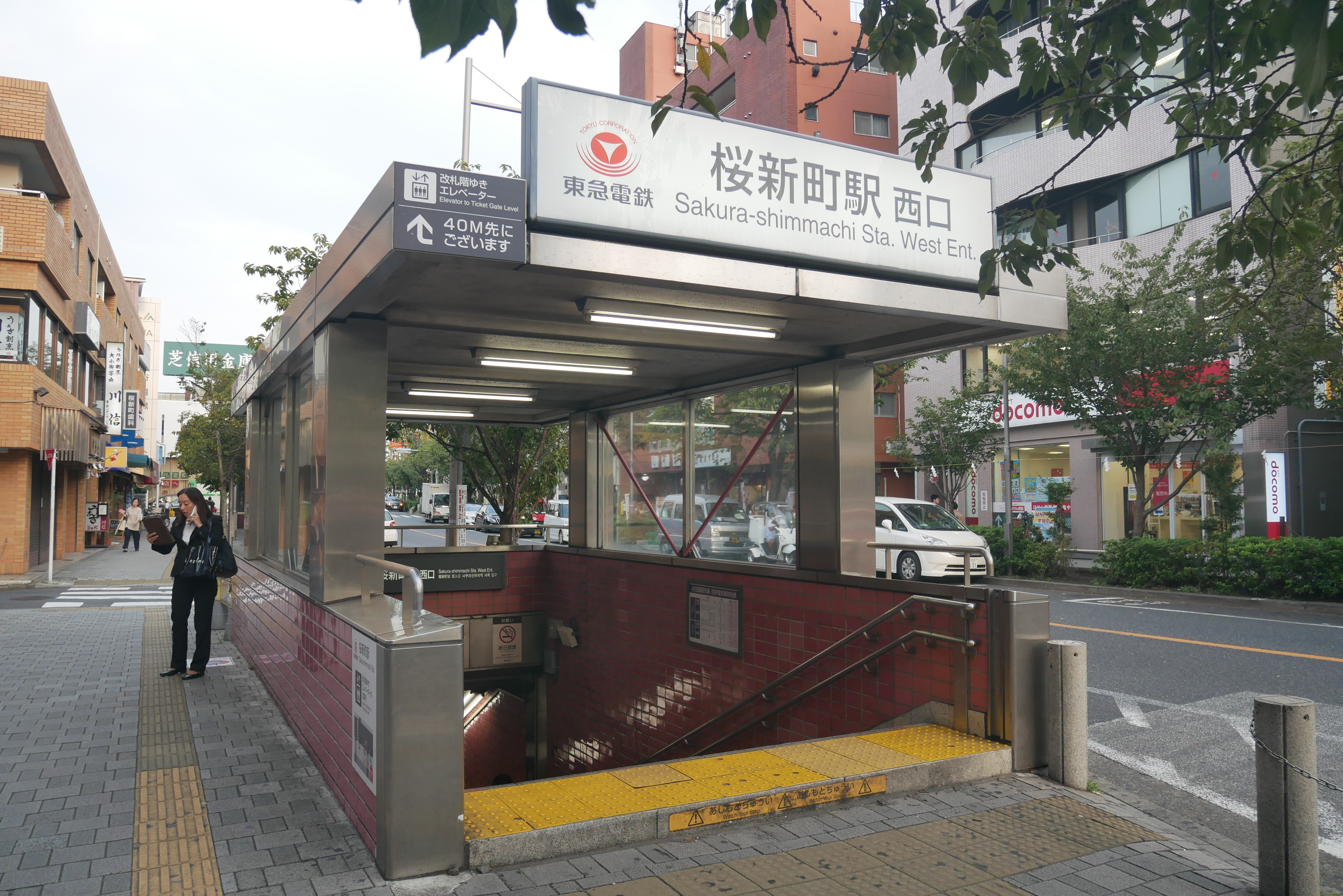
- Entrance to the station, 2018

General information
- Location: 2-8 Sakurashimmachi, Setagaya, Tokyo （東京都世田谷区桜新町2-8） Japan
- Operator: Tōkyū Railways
- Line: Den-en-toshi Line
- Platforms: 2 side platforms
- Tracks: 2

Construction
- Structure type: Underground

Other information
- Station code: DT05

History
- Opened: 7 April 1977; 49 years ago

Services
Preceding station	Tōkyū Railways	Following station
Yōga towards Chūō-rinkan	Den-en-toshi Line Semi-Express Local	Komazawa-daigaku towards Shibuya
Location
- Location within Special wards of Tokyo Location within Tokyo Bay and Bōsō Peninsula Location within Tokyo Location within Japan

Sakura-shimmachi Station (桜新町駅, Sakura-shinmachi-eki) is a railway station on the Tōkyū Den-en-toshi Line in Setagaya, Tokyo, Japan, operated by the private railway operator Tokyu Corporation.

== Lines ==
Sakura-shimmachi Station is served by Tokyu Den-en-toshi Line. It lies 6.3 km (3.9 mi) from the starting point of the line at Shibuya Station in Tokyo.

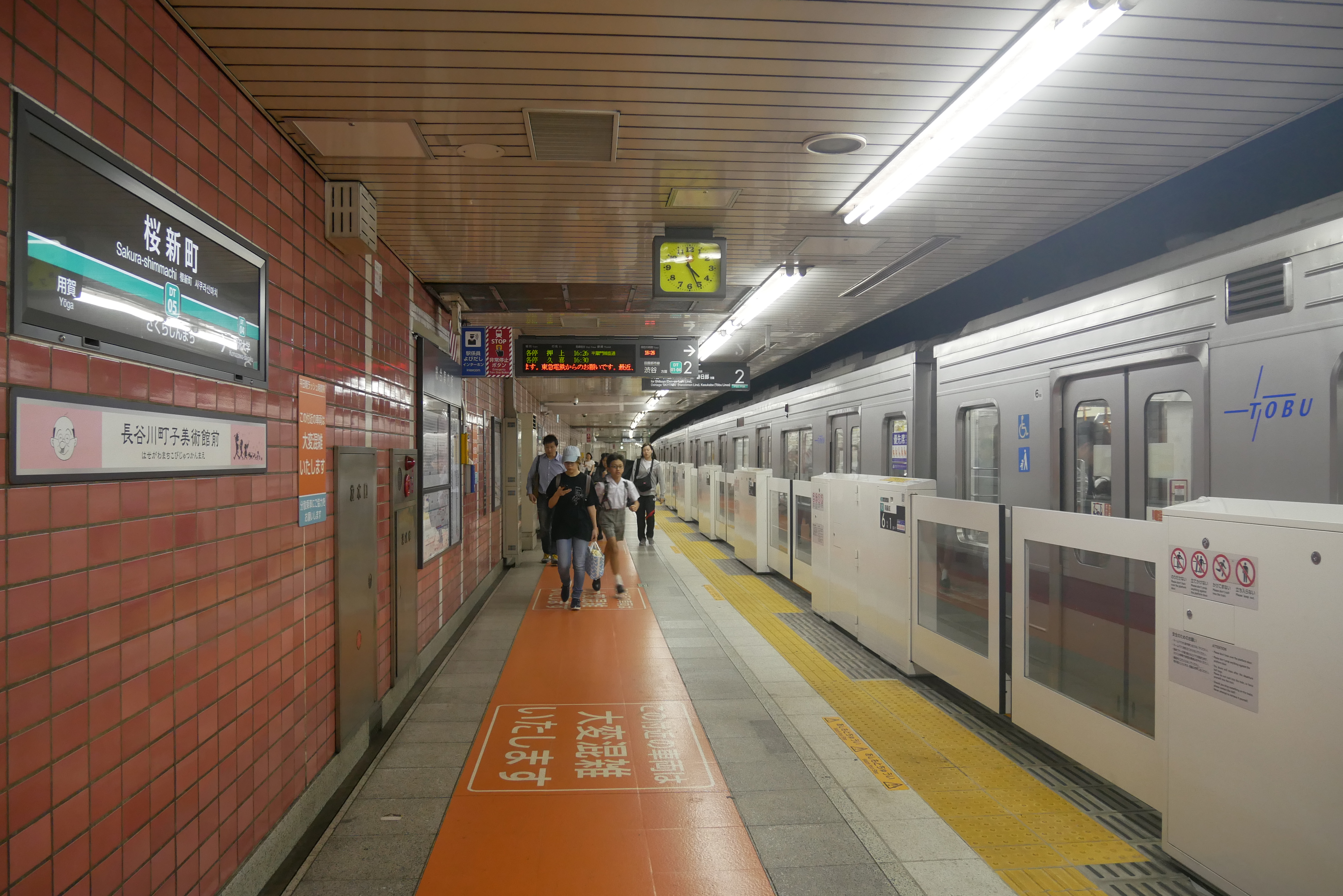
Platform 2 in 2018.

== Station layout ==
The station is an underground station with the concourse and ticket barriers located on the first basement ("B1F") level. There are two side platforms located above each other, with the down (for Chuo-Rinkan) platform 1 on the second basement ("B2F") level, and the up (for Shibuya) platform 2 on the third basement ("B3F") level.

=== Platforms ===
1	Tokyu Den-en-toshi Line	for Futako-tamagawa, Mizonokuchi, Nagatsuta, and Chūō-rinkan
2	Tokyu Den-en-toshi Line	for Shibuya; Tokyo Metro Hanzomon Line for Oshiage; Tobu Skytree Line for Tōbu-Dōbutsu-Kōen; Tobu Isesaki Line for Kuki; Tobu Nikko Line for Minami-kurihashi

== History ==
Sakura-shimmachi Station opened on 7 April 1977.

== Passenger statistics ==
In fiscal 2011, the station was used by an average of 65,618 passengers daily.

== Surrounding area ==
The station is located on a commercial street a short walk from the residential area of Tsurumaki. Hasegawa Machiko Art Museum is located near this station.
