= Setagaya Art Museum =

Art museum in Tokyo

- 世田谷美術館
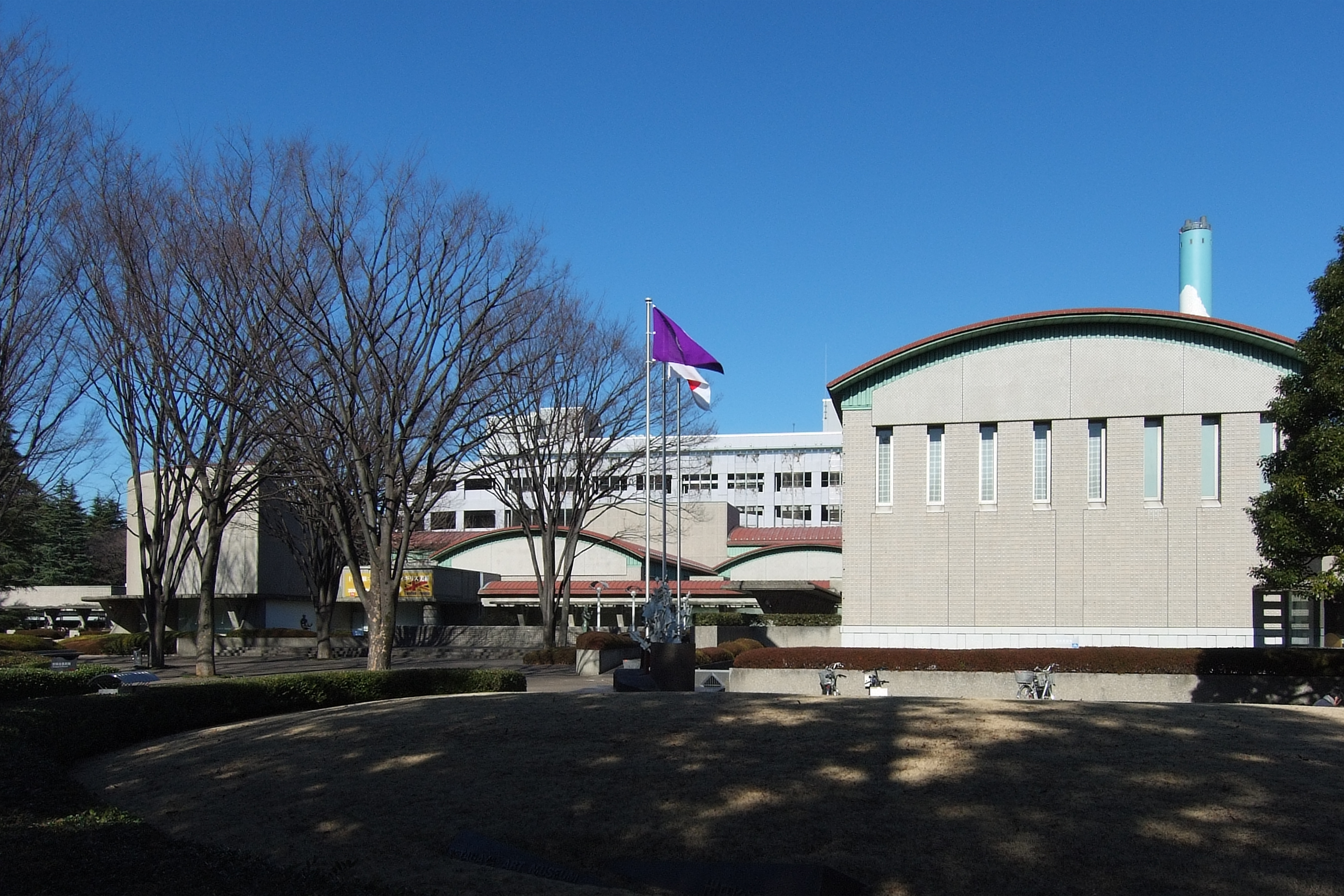
- Setagaya Art Museum

- Location of Setagaya Art Museum, Yōga, Setagaya, Tokyo, Japan
- Established: 1986
- Location: 1-2 Kinutakōen, Yōga, Setagaya, Tokyo, Japan 157-0075
- Coordinates: 35.631589°N 139.621897°E
- Type: Art museum
- Public transit access: Yōga Station, Tōkyū Den'entoshi Line
- Parking: None
- Website: Setagaya Art Museum 世田谷美術館(in Japanese)

The Setagaya Art Museum (世田谷美術館, Setagaya Bijutsukan) is an art museum in Yōga, Setagaya, Tokyo. The museum, which opened March 30, 1986, houses a permanent gallery and mounts seasonal exhibitions.

== Structure ==
The main building of the museum, a contemporary design by architect Shōzō Uchii, is on a corner of Kinuta Park at 1-2 Kinutakōen, Setagaya, Tokyo.

== Collections ==
The gallery's permanent collection contains a great number of photographs, particularly by Kineo Kuwabara and (numbering in the hundreds) Kōji Morooka. An unusually large exhibition was "Love You Tokyo" (ラヴ・ユー・トーキョー, Rabu Yū Tōkyō) of 1993, which brought together 265 works by Kuwabara and 1479 by Nobuyoshi Araki.

== Annexes ==
The Setagaya Art Museum maintains three annexes, all within Setagaya Ward.

- The Junkichi Mukai Annex, dedicated to Junkichi Mukai (1901 – 1995), was established in 1993 and is located in the Tsurumaki area of Setagaya.
- The Taiji Kiyokawa Memorial Gallery, dedicated to Taiji Kiyokawa (1919 – 2000), was established in 1995 and is located in the Seijō area of Setagaya.
- The Saburō Miyamoto Memorial Gallery, dedicated to Saburō Miyamoto (1905 – 1974), was established in 2004 and is located in the Okusawa area of Setagaya.

== Access ==
The Setagaya Art Museum is accessible from the Yōga Station on the Tōkyū Den'en-toshi Line.
