= Minami-Hanyū Station =

Railway station in Hanyū, Saitama Prefecture, Japan

TI06 Minami-Hanyū Station 南羽生駅
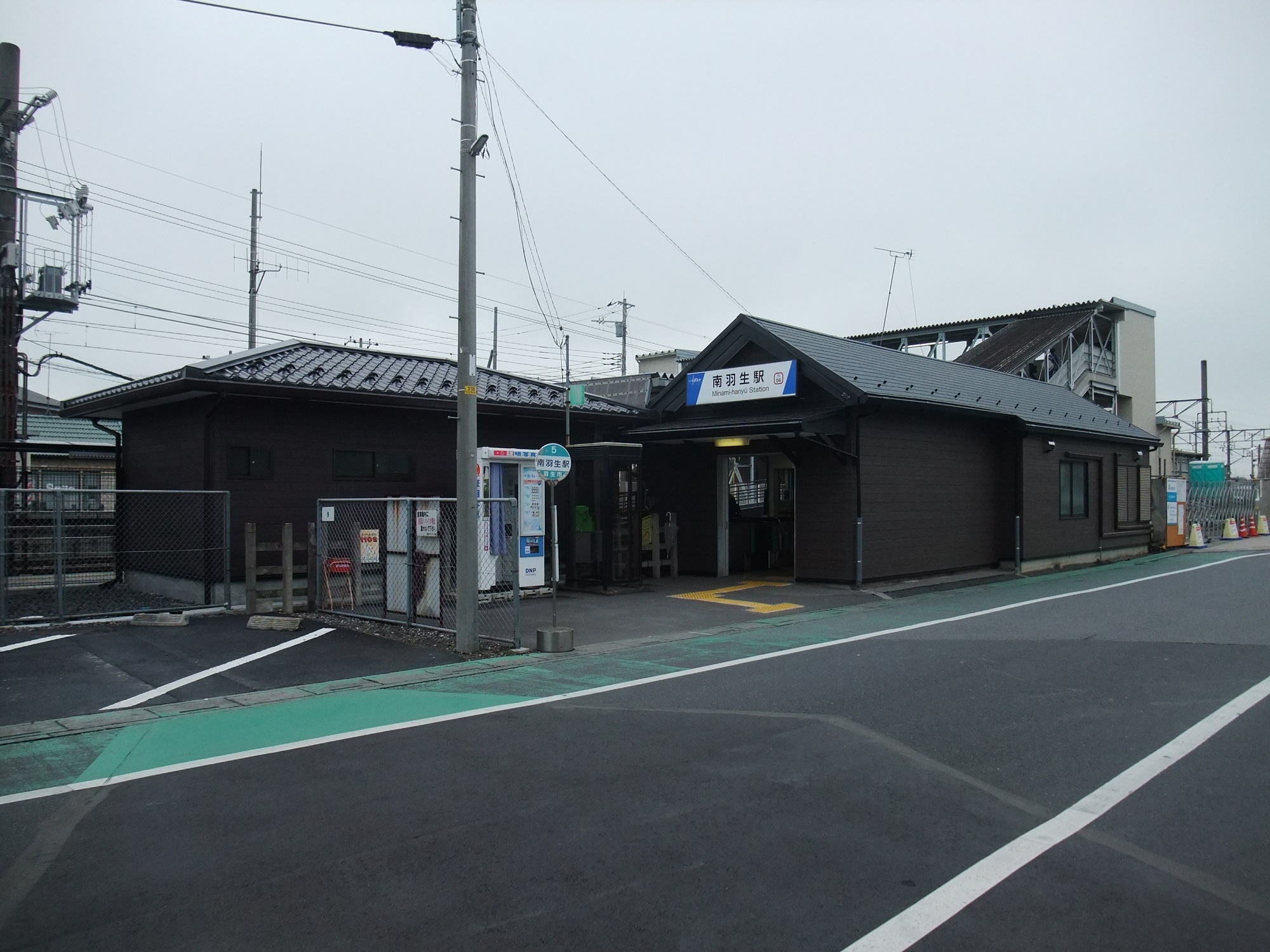
- The station building in July 2016

General information
- Location: 1-37 Minami-Hanyū, Hanyū-shi, Saitama-ken 348-0071; Japan
- Coordinates: 36.1496°N 139.5571°E
- Operator: Tōbu Railway
- Line: Tōbu Isesaki Line
- Distance: 63.1 km from Asakusa
- Platforms: 2 side platforms
- Tracks: 2

Other information
- Station code: TI-06
- Website: Official website

History
- Opened: 13 September 1903
- Former names: Sukage (until 1968)

Passengers
- FY2019: 3293 daily

Services
Preceding station	Tobu Railway	Following station
Kazo TI05 towards Tōbu-Dōbutsu-Kōen	Isesaki Line Section Express Section Semi Express	Hanyū TI07 towards Tatebayashi
Kazo TI05 towards Tōbu-Dōbutsu-Kōen	Isesaki Line Local	Hanyū TI07 towards Isesaki
Location
- Location within Saitama Prefecture Location within Japan

Minami-Hanyū Station (南羽生駅, Minami-Hanyū-eki) is a passenger railway station in the city of Hanyū, Saitama, Japan, operated by the private railway operator Tōbu Railway.

== Lines ==
Minami-Hanyū Station is served by the Tōbu Isesaki Line, and is located 63.1 kilometers from the line's Tokyo terminus at Asakusa.

== Station layout ==
This station has two opposed side platforms connected by a footbridge.

=== Platforms ===
1	■ Tōbu Isesaki Line	for Tatebayashi, Ashikagashi, and Ōta
2	■ Tōbu Isesaki Line	for Kuki, Tōbu-Dōbutsu-Kōen, Kasukabe, Kita-Senju, and Asakusa

== History ==
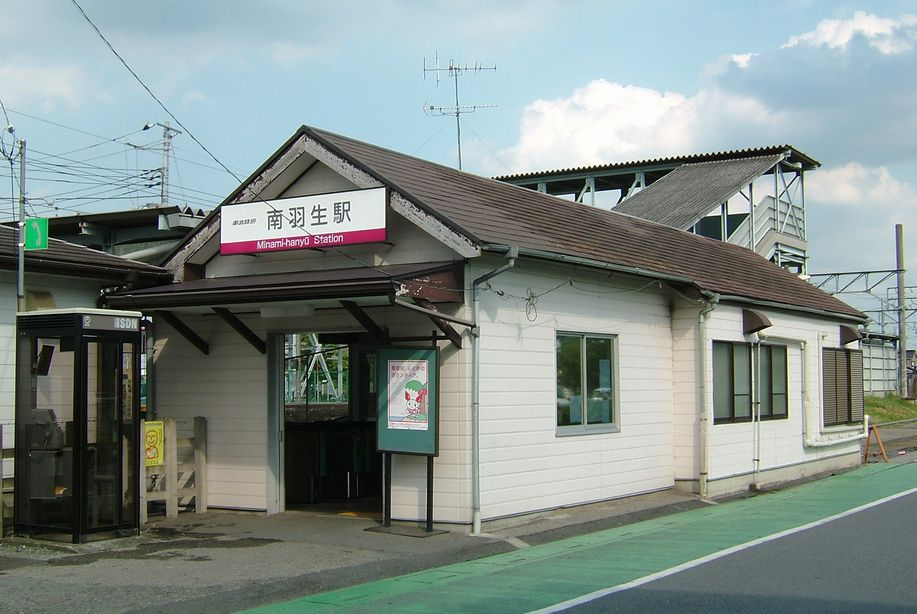
The station in 2007, before rebuilding

The station opened on 13 September 1903 as Sukage Station (須影駅). It closed 15 August 1908, and reopened on 1 April 1927. It was renamed Minami-Hanyū Station on 1 September 1968.

From 17 March 2012, station numbering was introduced on all Tōbu lines, with Minami-Hanyū Station becoming "TI-06".

== Passenger statistics ==
In fiscal 2019, the station was used by an average of 3793 passengers daily (boarding passengers only).

== Surrounding area ==
- Hanyū-Tekoba Post Office
- National Route 122
- Tekoba Elementary School

== See also ==
- List of railway stations in Japan
