= Higashi-Ōmiya Station =

Railway station in Saitama, Japan

Higashi-Ōmiya Station 東大宮駅
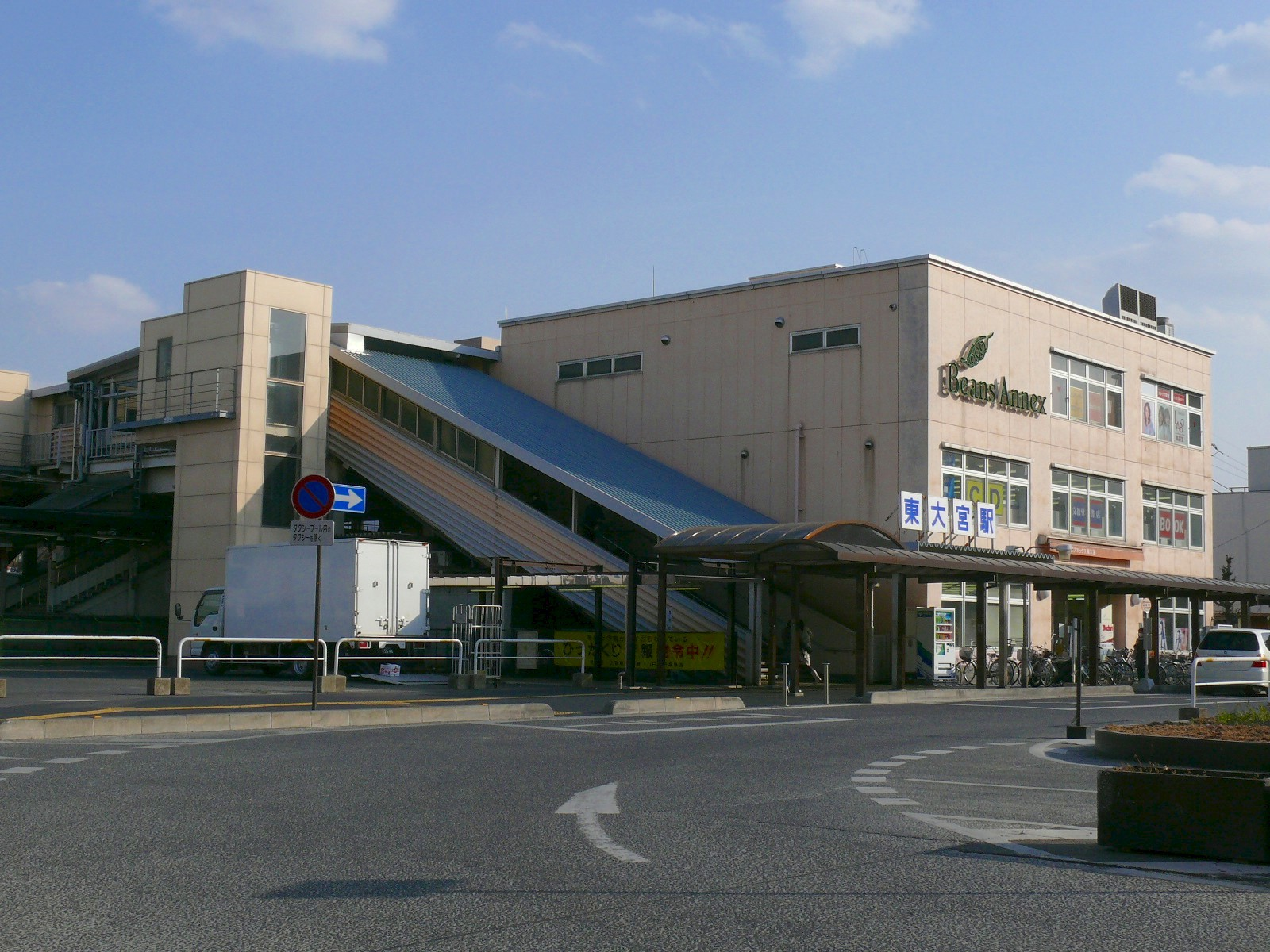
- Higashi-Ōmiya Station west exit, 2008

General information
- Location: 4-76-61 Higashiōmiya, Minuma-ku, Saitama-shi, Saitama-ken 337-0051; Japan
- Coordinates: 35.9486°N 139.6405°E
- Operator: JR East
- Line: Tōhoku Main Line
- Distance: 35.4 km from Tokyo
- Platforms: 1 island platform

Other information
- Status: Staffed
- Website: Official website

History
- Opened: March 20, 1964

Passengers
- FY2019: 33,531

Services
Preceding station	JR East	Following station
Ōmiya One-way operation	Utsunomiya Line Rapid Rabbit	Hasuda towards Utsunomiya
Toro towards Tokyo	Utsunomiya Line Local	Hasuda towards Kuroiso
Ōmiya towards Zushi	Shōnan–Shinjuku Line Rapid	Hasuda towards Utsunomiya
Toro towards Zushi	Shōnan–Shinjuku Line Local	Hasuda towards Utsunomiya
Location
- Location within Saitama Prefecture Location within Japan

Higashi-Ōmiya Station (東大宮駅, Higashi-Ōmiya-eki) is a passenger railway station on the Tōhoku Main Line located in Minuma-ku, Saitama, Japan, operated by East Japan Railway Company (JR East).

== Lines ==
Higashi-Ōmiya Station is served by the Tōhoku Main Line (Utsunomiya Line) and the Shōnan-Shinjuku Line, and lies 35.4 kilometers from the starting point of the Tōhoku Main Line at Tokyo.

== Station layout ==
This station has an elevated station building, with a single ground-level island platform serving two tracks. The station is staffed.

=== Platforms ===
1	■ Utsunomiya Line	for Oyama, Utsunomiya, Kuroiso
2	■ Utsunomiya Line (Ueno-Tokyo Line)	for Ōmiya, Ueno, Tokyo, Yokohama, Atami, Numazu and Itō (via Tōkaidō Line and Itō Line)
2	■ Shōnan–Shinjuku Line	for Ōmiya, Shinjuku, Yokohama, Ōfuna and Zushi (via Yokosuka Line)

== History ==
The station opened on March 20, 1964. With the privatization of JNR on 1 April 1987, the station came under the control of JR East.

== Passenger statistics ==
In fiscal 2019, the station was used by an average of 33,531 passengers daily (boarding passengers only).

== See also ==
- List of railway stations in Japan
