= Shin-Shiraoka Station =

Railway station in Shiraoka, Saitama Prefecture, Japan

Shin-Shiraoka Station 新白岡駅
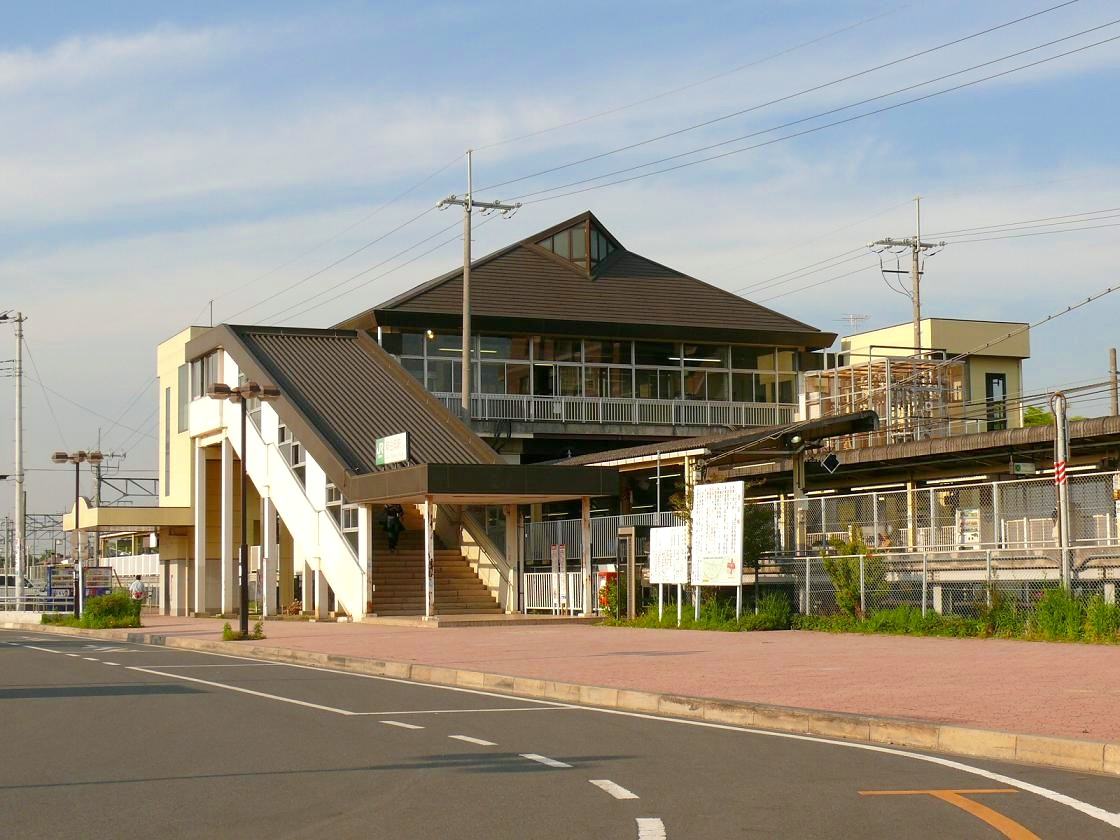
- Shin-Shiraoka Station west exit, February 2010

General information
- Location: 1107-4 Yagyu, Shiraoka-shi, Saitama-ken 349-0212; Japan
- Coordinates: 36°02′19″N 139°40′20″E
- Operator: JR East
- Line: Tōhoku Main Line
- Distance: 45.9 km from Tokyo
- Platforms: 2 side platforms
- Connections: Bus stop

Other information
- Status: Staffed
- Website: Official website

History
- Opened: 26 February 1987

Passengers
- FY2019: 6,954

Services
Preceding station	JR East	Following station
Shiraoka towards Tokyo	Utsunomiya Line Local	Kuki towards Kuroiso
Shiraoka towards Zushi	Shōnan–Shinjuku Line Local	Kuki towards Utsunomiya
Location
- Location within Saitama Prefecture Location within Japan

Shin-Shiraoka Station (新白岡駅, Shin-Shiraoka-eki) is a passenger railway station located in the city of Shiraoka, Saitama, Japan, operated by East Japan Railway Company (JR East).

== Lines ==
Shin-Shiraoka Station is served by the Tōhoku Main Line (Utsunomiya Line) and the Shōnan-Shinjuku Line, and lies 45.9 kilometers from the starting point of the Tohoku Main Line at Tokyo.

== Station layout ==
This station has an elevated station building with two opposed ground-level side platforms underneath, serving three tracks. The station is staffed.

=== Platforms ===
1	■ Utsunomiya Line (Ueno-Tokyo Line)	for Ōmiya, Ueno, Tokyo, Yokohama, Atami, Numazu and Itō (via Tokaido Line and Itō Line)
1	■ Shōnan–Shinjuku Line	for Ōmiya, Shinjuku, Yokohama, Ōfuna and Zushi (via Yokosuka Line)
2	■ Utsunomiya Line	for Oyama, Utsunomiya, Kuroiso

== History ==
Shin-Shiraoka Station opened on 26 February 1987. With the privatization of Japanese National Railways (JNR) on 1 April 1987, the station came under the control of JR East.

== Passenger statistics ==
In fiscal 2019, the station was used by an average of 6,954 passengers daily (boarding passengers only).

== Surrounding area ==
- Shiraoka New Town

== See also ==
- List of railway stations in Japan
