= Machiko Hasegawa =

Japanese manga artist (1920–1992)

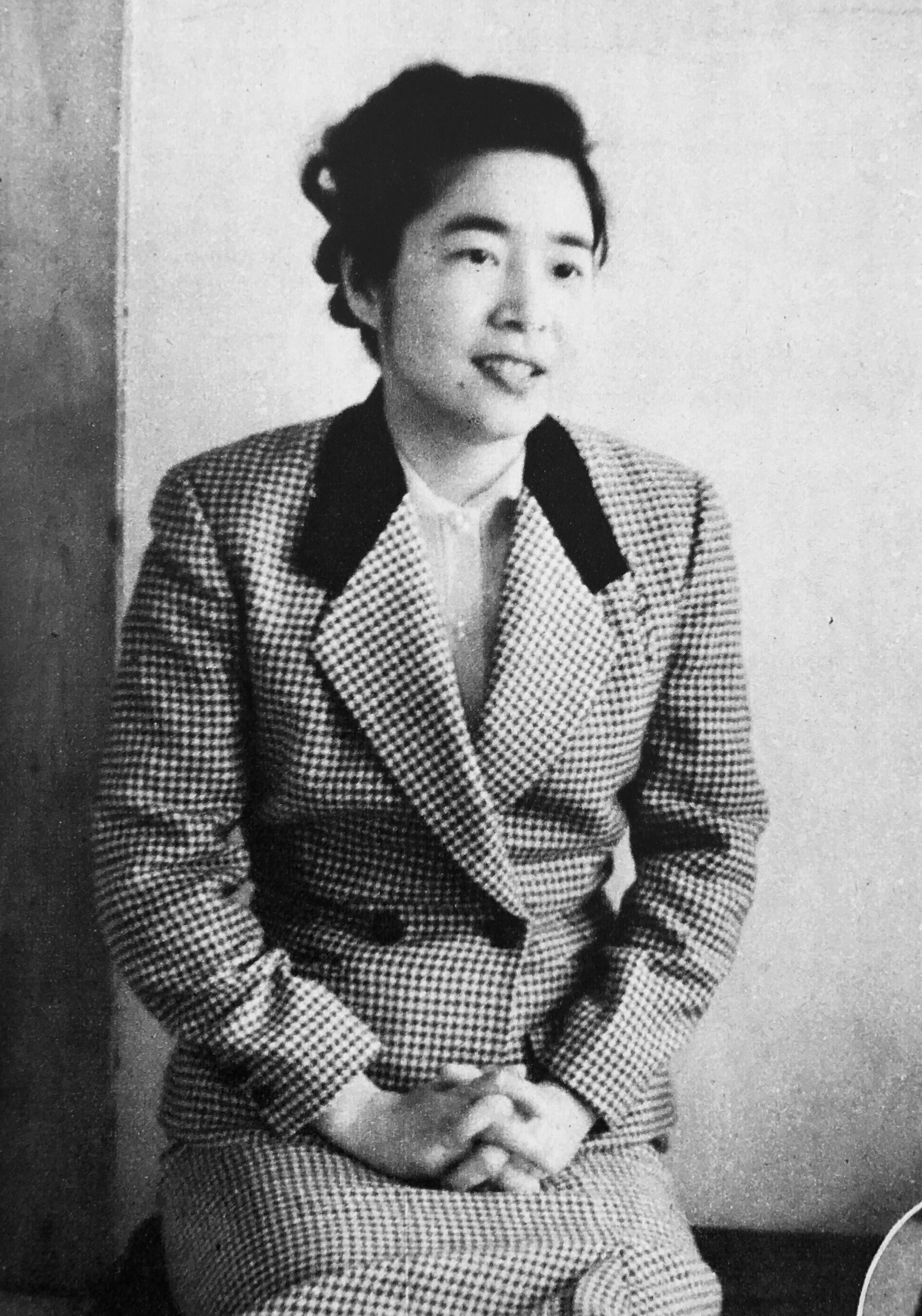
- Hasegawa in 1955
- Born: January 30, 1920; Taku, Saga Prefecture, Empire of Japan
- Died: May 27, 1992 (aged 72); Tokyo, Japan
- Occupation: Manga artist
- Known for: Sazae-san, Ijiwaru Bā-san
- Awards: Full list

Machiko Hasegawa (長谷川町子, Hasegawa Machiko; January 30, 1920 – May 27, 1992) was a Japanese manga artist and one of the first female manga artists. She started her own comic strip, Sazae-san, in 1946. It reached national circulation via the Asahi Shimbun in 1949, and ran daily until Hasegawa decided to retire in February 1974. All of her comics were printed in Japan in digest comics; by the mid-1990s, Hasegawa's estate had sold over 60 million copies in Japan alone.

== Life and career ==
Machiko Hasegawa was born January 30, 1920, in Taku, Saga Prefecture. When she was 15, her father died and the family moved to Tokyo, where she took up drawing cartoons. She successfully published several in magazines and newspapers, such as Sazae-san (サザエさん; 1946–1974), Ijiwaru Bā-san (いじわるばあさん; "Granny Mischief", 1966–1971), Epuron Oba-san (エプロンおばさん; "Aunt Apron", 1957–1965), and a few that only ran for a short while. Her comics were the first to follow a consistent four-panel layout, which later became the standard.

Hasegawa never married, instead living with her older sister Mariko. Both were art collectors, and their collection is housed in the Hasegawa Machiko Art Museum. The two started the Shimaisha Publishing Company, through which 20 million paperback copies of her comics have been published. Hasegawa died of heart failure on May 27, 1992, at the age of 72. Towards the end of her life she stopped appearing in public and on television, and her death was kept a secret for 35 days after her private funeral as requested in her will.

== Sazae-san ==
Sazae-san was a popular postwar comic strip depicting the life of Sazae-san, a fictional Japanese housewife.

The comic strip was turned into a dramatic radio series in 1955 and a weekly animated series in 1969, which is still running as of 2026.

Hasegawa was involved in a court case with a bus company's unapproved use of Sazae-san and its characters in promotional images, as well as the name of the business, "Sazae-san Tours". As a result of this case, new copyright laws were established that extended protection for fictional characters as individual identities, not just within their series of origin.

Selected comics were translated into English, under the title The Wonderful World of Sazae-san.

== Awards ==
Hasegawa won the 8th Bungeishunjū Manga Award for Sazae-san in 1962. She was the first female manga artist to receive Japan's Medal of Honor with Purple Ribbon in 1982. She also received the 4th Tokyo Cultural Award in 1988; the Order of the Precious Crown, Fourth Class in 1990; the Minister of Education Award for Sazae-san at the 20th Japan Cartoonists Association Awards in 1991; the 10th People's Honor Award in 1992; and the Special Prize at the 24th Tezuka Osamu Cultural Prizes in 2020.

== See also ==
- Hasegawa Machiko Art Museum
