= Shiraoka Station =

Railway station in Shiraoka, Saitama Prefecture, Japan

Shiraoka Station 白岡駅
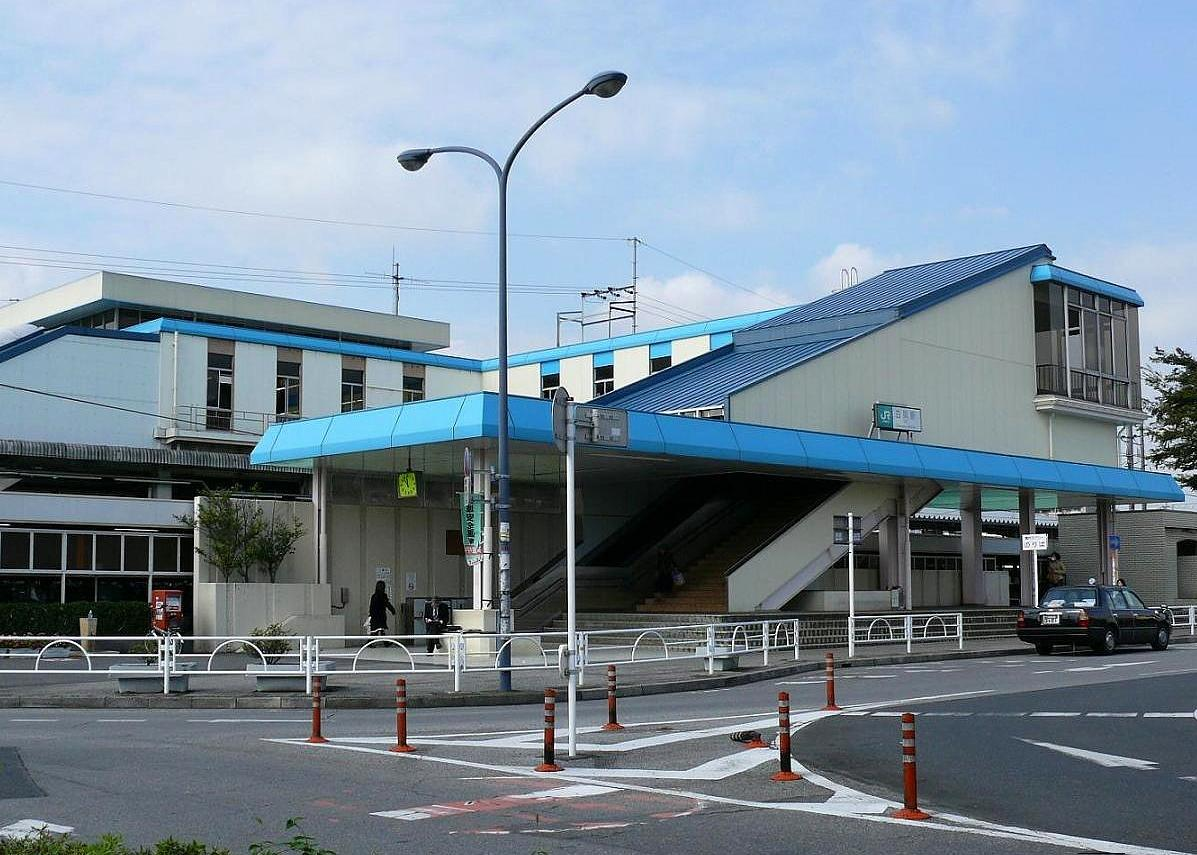
- Shiraoka Station east exit, October 2007

General information
- Location: 1213 Koguki, Shiraoka-shi, Saitama-ken 349-0217; Japan
- Coordinates: 36.0175°N 139.6666°E
- Operator: JR East
- Line: Tōhoku Main Line
- Distance: 43.5 km from Tokyo
- Platforms: 1 island platform
- Tracks: 3
- Connections: Bus stop

Other information
- Status: Staffed
- Website: Official website

History
- Opened: 11 February 1910

Passengers
- FY2019: 12,854

Services
Preceding station	JR East	Following station
Hasuda towards Tokyo	Utsunomiya Line Local	Shin-Shiraoka towards Kuroiso
Hasuda towards Zushi	Shōnan–Shinjuku Line Local	Shin-Shiraoka towards Utsunomiya
Location
- Location within Saitama Prefecture Location within Japan

Shiraoka Station (白岡駅, Shiraoka-eki) is a passenger railway station in the city of Shiraoka, Saitama, Japan, operated by East Japan Railway Company (JR East).

== Lines ==
Shiraoka Station is served by the Tohoku Main Line (Utsunomiya Line) and the Shōnan-Shinjuku Line, and lies 43.5 kilometers from the starting point of the Tohoku Main Line at Tokyo.

== Station layout ==
This station has an elevated station building with one ground-level island platform and one ground-level side platform underneath, serving three tracks. The station is staffed.

=== Platforms ===
1	■ Utsunomiya Line	for Oyama, Utsunomiya, Kuroiso
2	■ Utsunomiya Line	(for both directions)
3	■ Utsunomiya Line (Ueno-Tokyo Line)	for Ōmiya, Ueno, Tokyo, Yokohama, Atami, Numazu and Ito (via Tokaido Line and Ito Line)
3	■ Shōnan–Shinjuku Line	for Ōmiya, Shinjuku, Yokohama, Ōfuna and Zushi (via Yokosuka Line)

== History ==
Shiraoka Station opened on 11 February 1910. With the privatization of JNR on 1 April 1987, the station came under the control of JR East.

== Passenger statistics ==
In fiscal 2019, the station was used by an average of 12,854 passengers daily (boarding passengers only).

== Surrounding area ==
- Shiraoka Central General Hospital
- Kogukihisaizu Shrine
- Shiraoka City Central Community Center

== See also ==
- List of railway stations in Japan
