= Shiraoka =

Shiraoka 白岡市
- City
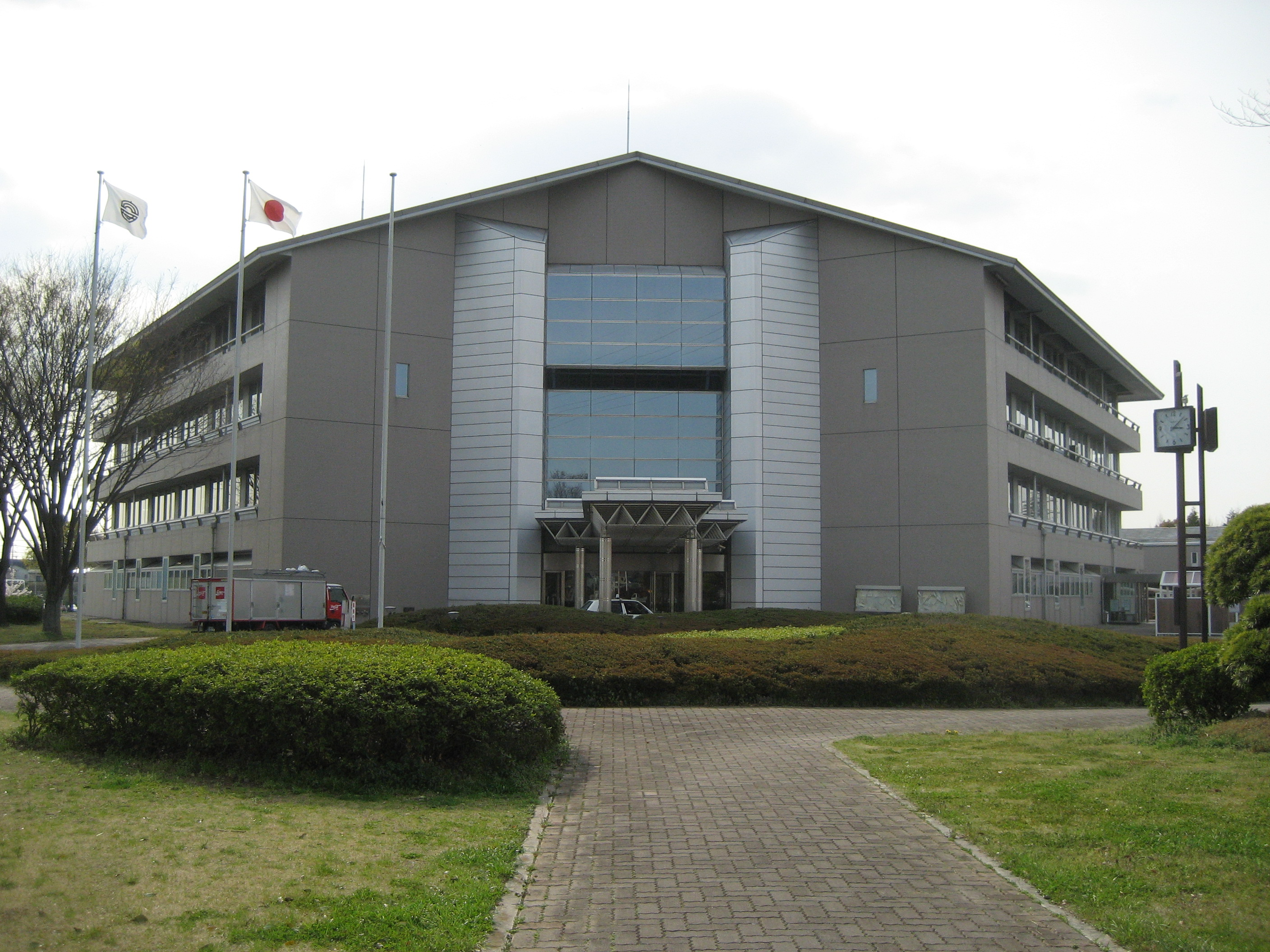
- Shiraoka City Hall

- Flag Seal

- Location of Shiraoka in Saitama Prefecture

- Location within Japan
- Coordinates: 36°1′8.6″N 139°40′37″E
- Country: Japan
- Region: Kantō
- Prefecture: Saitama

Area
  - Total: 24.92 km^{2} (9.62 sq mi)

Population (February 2021)
  - Total: 52,431
  - Density: 2,104/km^{2} (5,449/sq mi)
- Time zone: UTC+9 (Japan Standard Time)
- Tree: Pine
- Flower: Pyrus pyrifolia
- Phone number: 0480-92-1111
- Address: 432 Sendano, Shiraoka-shi, Saitama-ken 349-0215
- Website: Official website

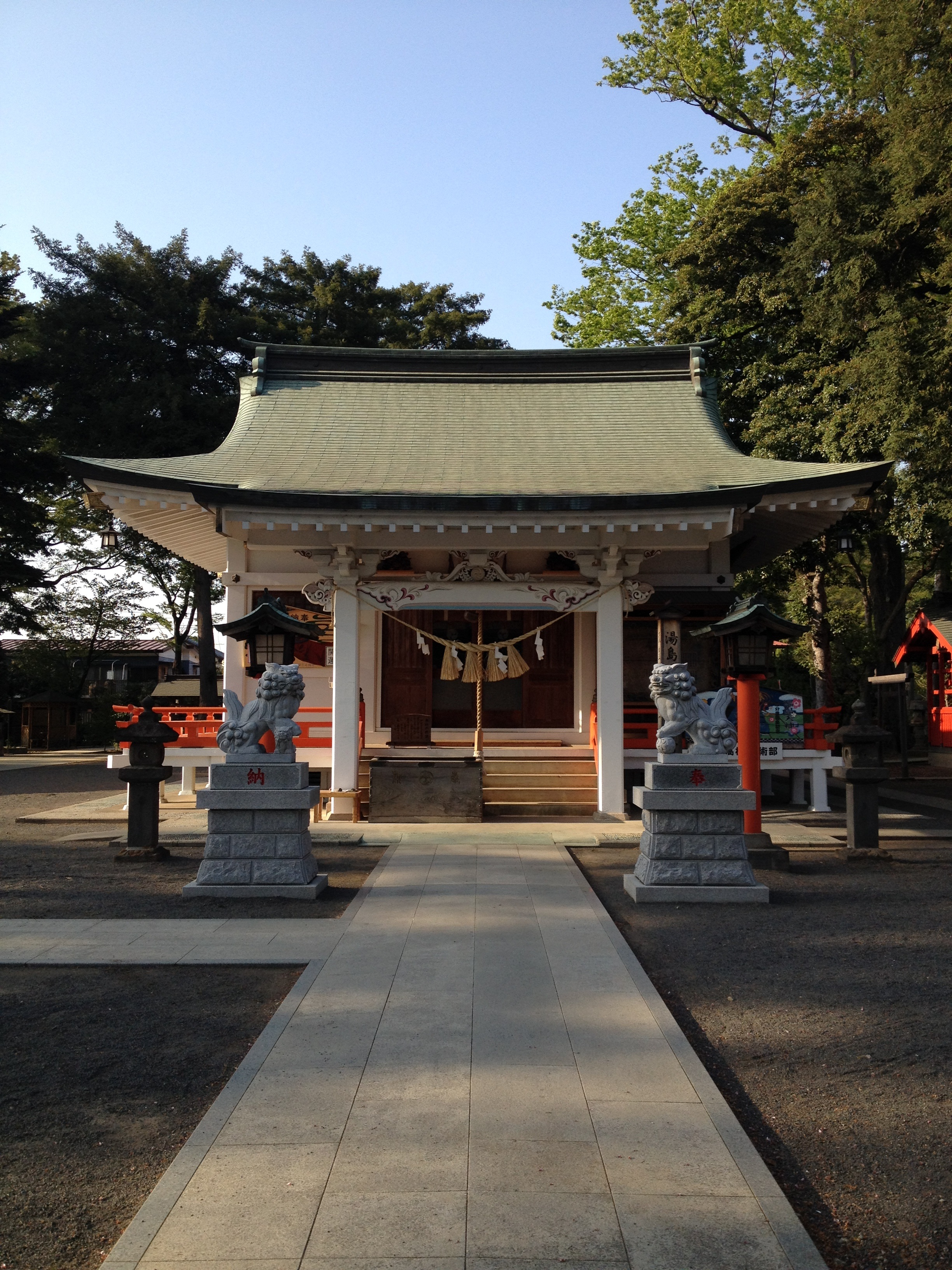
Shiraoka Hachiman-gu

Shiraoka (白岡市, Shiraoka-shi) is a city located in Saitama Prefecture, Japan. As of 1 February 2021, the city had an estimated population of 52,431 in 21,997 households and a population density of 2100 persons per km^{2}. The total area of the city is 24.92 square kilometres (9.62 sq mi).

== Geography ==
Shiraoka is located slightly south of the center of the Kanto Plain in the flatlands eastern Saitama Prefecture and has an almost flat terrain. The highest point in the city is 16 meters above sea level. The Motoara River runs along the city border with Hasuda. Shiraoka is approximately 40 kilometers from downtown Tokyo.,

=== Surrounding municipalities ===
- Saitama Prefecture
  - Hasuda
  - Kasukabe
  - Kuki
  - Miyashiro
  - Saitama (Iwatsuki-ku)

=== Climate ===
Shiraoka has a humid subtropical climate (Köppen Cfa) characterized by warm summers and cool winters with light to no snowfall. The average annual temperature in Shiraoka is 14.7 °C. The average annual rainfall is 1352 mm with September as the wettest month. The temperatures are highest on average in August, at around 26.7 °C, and lowest in January, at around 3.77 °C.

== Demographics ==
Per Japanese census data, the population of Shiraoka has increased from the 1980s.

Historical population
Year	Pop.	±%
1980	31,624	—
1990	38,319	+21.2%
2000	46,999	+22.7%
2010	50,272	+7.0%
2020	52,214	+3.9%

== History ==
The villages of Shinozu and Oyama were created within Minamisaitama District, Saitama with the establishment of the modern municipalities system on April 1, 1889. On September 1, 1965, Shinozu and the neighboring village of Hikachi, together with a part of Oyama merged to form the town of Shiraoka. Shiraoka was elevated to city status on October 1, 2012.

== Government ==
Shiraoka has a mayor-council form of government with a directly elected mayor and a unicameral city council of 18 members. Shiraoka, together with the town of Miyashiro, contributes one member to the Saitama Prefectural Assembly. In terms of national politics, the city is part of Saitama 13th district of the lower house of the Diet of Japan.

=== Mayors ===
- Suguru Kojima (2012-2020)
- Eiichiro Fujii (from 2020)

== Economy ==
Shiraoka remains primarily an agricultural community; however due to its location, it is increasingly becoming a bedroom community for neighboring Saitama City and the Tokyo metropolis.

== Education ==
Shiraoka has five public elementary schools and four public middle schools operated by the city government, and one public high school operated by the Saitama Prefectural Board of Education.

== Transportation ==
=== Railway ===
JR East – Utsunomiya Line

- Shiraoka - Shin-Shiraoka

=== Highway ===
- Ken-Ō Expressway
- Tōhoku Expressway
- National Route 122

== Local attractions ==
- Shiraoka Hachiman-gu

== Noted people from Shiraoka ==
- Hiroshi Narahara, professional baseball player
