= Yōga Station =

Railway station in Tokyo, Japan

Coordinates: 35°37′35″N 139°38′02″E

Yōga Station 用賀駅

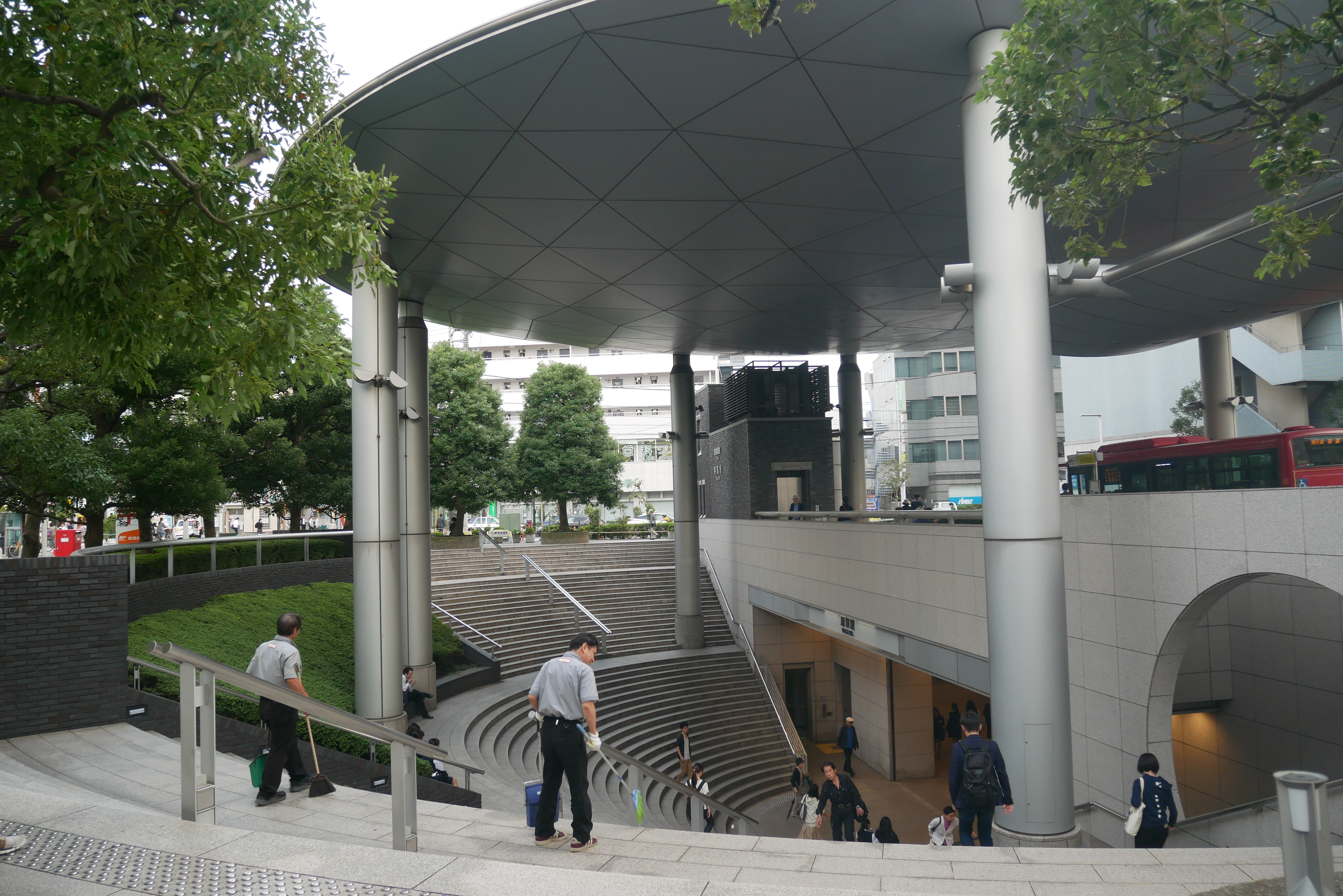
- Main entrance, October 2018

General information
- Location: 39, 2-chome, Yoga, Setagaya, Tokyo （東京都世田谷区用賀2丁目39番） Japan
- Operator: Tōkyū Railways
- Line: Den-en-toshi Line
- Platforms: 2 side platforms
- Tracks: 2
- Connections: Bus terminal

Construction
- Structure type: Underground

Other information
- Station code: DT06

History
- Opened: 7 April 1977; 49 years ago

Passengers
- 2021: 55,631 daily

Services
Preceding station	Tōkyū Railways	Following station
Futako-tamagawa towards Chūō-rinkan	Den-en-toshi Line Semi-Express Local	Sakura-shimmachi towards Shibuya
Location
- Location within Tokyo wards area Location within Japan

Yōga Station (用賀駅, Yōga-eki) is a railway station on the Tōkyū Den-en-toshi Line located in Setagaya, Tokyo, Japan. This station is one of the nearest stations to Kinuta Park.

== Lines ==
Yōga Station is served by the Tōkyū Den-en-toshi Line. It is 7.6 kilometers from the starting point of the Tōkyū Den-en-toshi Line at Shibuya.

== Station layout ==
The station is composed of two side platforms.

=== Platforms ===
1	Tokyu Den-en-toshi Line	for Futako-tamagawa, Mizonokuchi, Nagatsuta, and Chūō-rinkan
2	Tokyu Den-en-toshi Line	for Shibuya; Tokyo Metro Hanzomon Line for Oshiage; Tobu Skytree Line for Tōbu-Dōbutsu-Kōen; Tobu Isesaki Line for Kuki; Tobu Nikko Line for Minami-kurihashi

== History ==
- April 1, 1907: Opened as Yōga stop on the Tamagawa Electric Railway (玉川電気鉄道, Tamagawa Denki Tetsudō).
- May 10, 1969: Closed along with the discontinuation of the Tamagawa Line.
- April 7, 1977: Opened as a station on the Shin-tamagawa Line (新玉川線, Shin-tamagawa-sen).
- 1993: Renovation of the north exit, along with construction of the bus terminal.
