= Kazo Station =

Railway station in Kazo, Saitama Prefecture, Japan

TI05 Kazo Station 加須駅
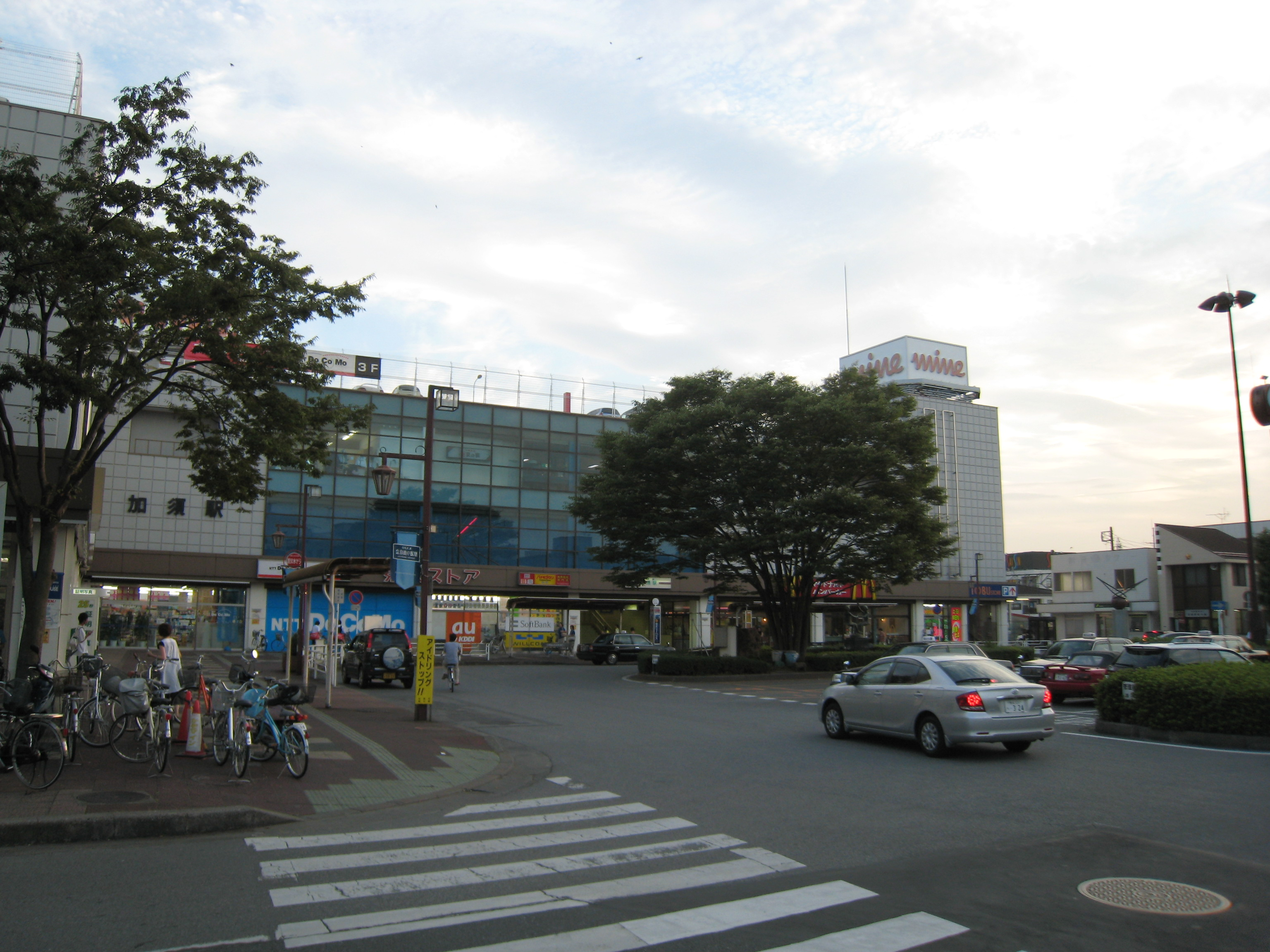
- Kazo Station north exit, August 2007

General information
- Location: 1-1-15 Chuo, Kazo-shi, Saitama-ken 347-0055; Japan
- Coordinates: 36.1229°N 139.5955°E
- Operator: Tōbu Railway
- Line: Tōbu Isesaki Line
- Distance: 58.5 km from Asakusa
- Platforms: 1 island + 1 side platform

Other information
- Station code: TI-05
- Website: Official website

History
- Opened: 6 September 1902

Passengers
- FY2019: 13,569 daily

Services
Preceding station	Tobu Railway	Following station
Kuki TI02 towards Asakusa	Ryomo	Hanyū TI07 towards Kuzū, Akagi or Isesaki
Hanasaki TI04 towards Tōbu-Dōbutsu-Kōen	Isesaki Line Section Express Section Semi Express	Minami-Hanyū TI06 towards Tatebayashi
Hanasaki TI04 towards Tōbu-Dōbutsu-Kōen	Isesaki Line Local	Minami-Hanyū TI06 towards Isesaki
Location
- Location within Saitama Prefecture Location within Japan

Kazo Station (加須駅, Kazo-eki) is a passenger railway station located in the city of Kazo, Saitama, Japan, operated by the private railway operator Tōbu Railway.

== Lines ==
Kazo Station is served by the Tōbu Isesaki Line, and is located 58.5 km from the Tokyo terminus at Asakusa. Section Express, Section Semi Express, and Local all-stations services stop at this station. Some limited express Ryomo services also stop here.

== Station layout ==
This station has an elevated station building, with one island platform and one side platform serving three tracks located on the ground level.

=== Platforms ===
1	■ Tōbu Isesaki Line	for Kuki, Tōbu-Dōbutsu-Kōen, Kasukabe, Kita-Senju, and Asakusa
2, 3	■ Tōbu Isesaki Line	for Tatebayashi, Ashikagashi, and Ōta

== History ==
Kazo Station opened on 6 September 1902. A new elevated station building was completed on 22 November 1985.

From 17 March 2012, station numbering was introduced on all Tōbu lines, with Kazo Station becoming "TI-05".

== Passenger statistics ==
In fiscal 2019, the station was used by an average of 13,569 passengers daily.

== Surrounding area ==
- Kazo City Hall
- Kazo Post Office
- Kazo City Chamber of Commerce

== See also ==
- List of railway stations in Japan
