= Hasuda =

Hasuda 蓮田市
- City
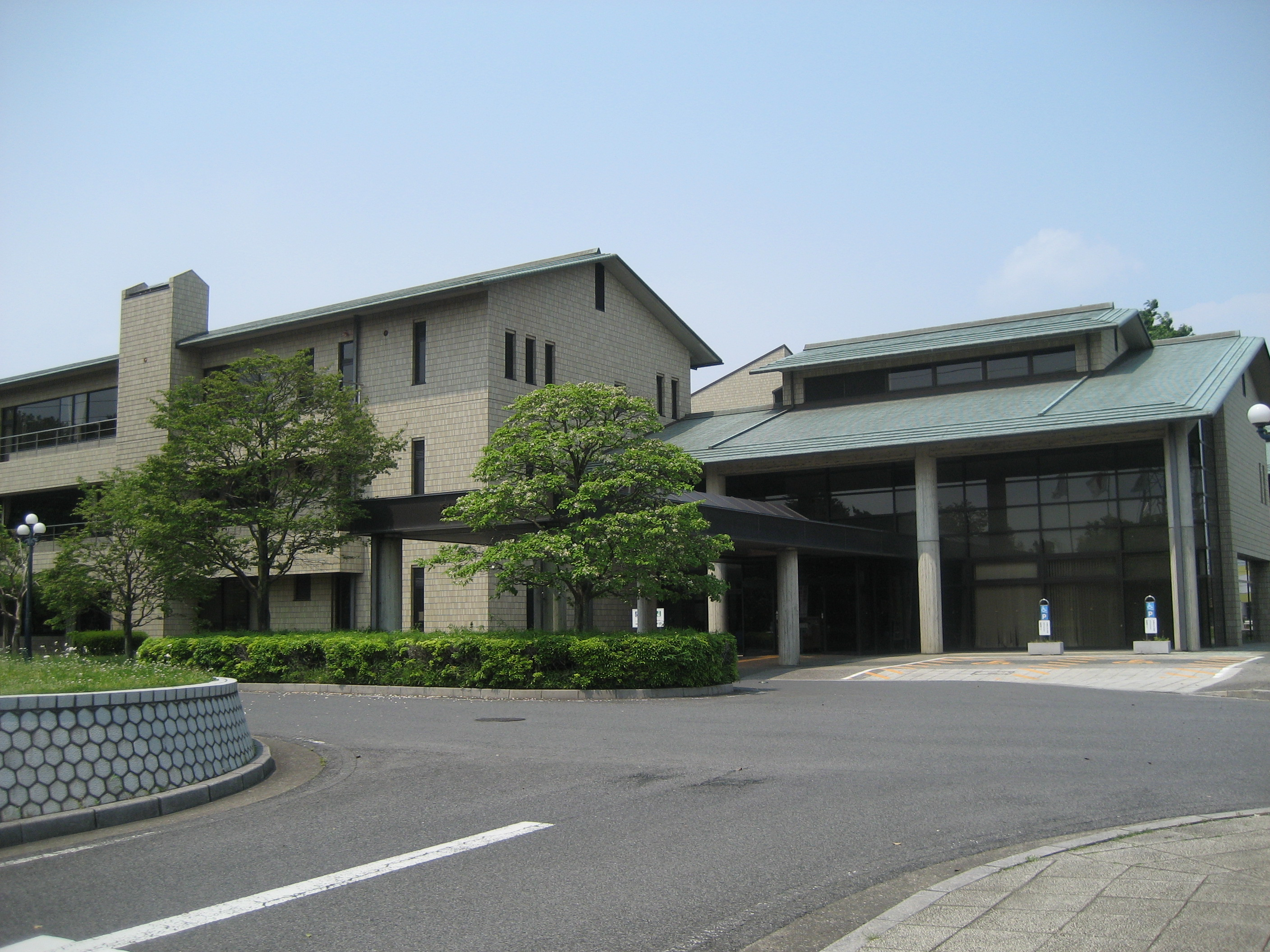
- Hasuda City Hall

- Flag Seal

- Location of Hasuda in Saitama Prefecture

- Location within Japan
- Coordinates: 35°59′40.2″N 139°39′44.6″E
- Country: Japan
- Region: Kantō
- Prefecture: Saitama

Area
  - Total: 27.28 km^{2} (10.53 sq mi)

Population (January 2021)
  - Total: 61,540
  - Density: 2,256/km^{2} (5,843/sq mi)
- Time zone: UTC+9 (Japan Standard Time)
- Tree: flowering dogwood
- Flower: Nymphaea
- Phone number: 048-768-3111
- Address: 2799-1 Kurohama, Hasuda-shi, Saitama-ken 349-0193
- Website: Official website

Hasuda (蓮田市, Hasuda-shi) is a city located in Saitama Prefecture, Japan. As of 1 January 2024, the city had an estimated population of 61,337 in 28,406 households and a population density of 2248 persons per km^{2}. The total area of the city is 27.28 square kilometres (10.53 sq mi).

== Geography ==
Located in east-central Saitama Prefecture, Hasuda is directly north of the prefectural capital of Saitama City. It consists of the Hasuda Plateau in the center of the city, which is part of the Omiya Plateau, the Shiraoka (Kurohama) Plateau in the east, with Motoara River in between, and the lowlands around the Ayase River that runs west and south.

=== Surrounding municipalities ===
Saitama Prefecture

- Ageo
- Ina
- Kuki
- Okegawa
- Saitama (Iwatsuki-ku, Minuma-ku)
- Shiraoka

=== Climate ===
Hasuda has a humid subtropical climate (Köppen Cfa) characterized by warm summers and cool winters with light to no snowfall. The average annual temperature in Hasuda is 14.7 °C. The average annual rainfall is 1363 mm with September as the wettest month. The temperatures are highest on average in August, at around 26.7 °C, and lowest in January, at around 3.8 °C.

== Demographics ==
Per Japanese census data, the population of Hasuda peaked around the year 2000 and has declined slightly in the decades since.

Historical population
Year	Pop.	±%
1960	20,673	—
1970	31,935	+54.5%
1980	45,594	+42.8%
1990	59,706	+31.0%
2000	64,386	+7.8%
2010	63,309	−1.7%
2020	61,499	−2.9%

== History ==
The area of modern Hasuda has been settled since the prehistoric period, and there are numerous archaeological sites, including shell middens and burial mounds within the city limits. In addition, traces of samurai residences and castles from the Sengoku period remain. Much of what is now Hasuda was part of Iwatsuki Domain under the Edo period Tokugawa shogunate. After the Meiji restoration, the village of Ayase was created within Minamisaitama District with the establishment of the modern municipalities system on April 1, 1889. It was raised to town status on October 1, 1934, and renamed Hasuda. Hasuda annexed the neighboring villages of Kurohama and Hirano on May 3, 1954, and was elevated to city status on October 1, 1972.

On March 31, 2010, Hasuda was to be merged with the neighboring town of Shiraoka (from Minamisaitama District). However, the merger was canceled shortly after Shiraoka managed to grow its population to 50,000 people, qualifying it as a city.

== Government ==
Hasuda has a mayor-council form of government with a directly elected mayor and a unicameral city council of 20 members. Hasuda contributes one member to the Saitama Prefectural Assembly. In terms of national politics, the city is part of Saitama 13th district of the lower house of the Diet of Japan.

== Economy ==
Due to this location, Hasuda is primarily a bedroom community with over half of its population commuting to neighboring Saitama City or to the Tokyo metropolis for work. However, much of the city remains agricultural.

== Education ==
Hasuda has eight public elementary schools and five public middle schools operated by the city government, and one public high school operated by the Saitama Prefectural Board of Education. The prefecture also operates two special education schools for the handicapped.

Kindergarten

- Oyama kindergarten
- Kurohama kindergarten
- Shirayuri kindergarten
- Shinjuku kindergarten
- Hasuda Kindergarten

Nursery

- Nakamura home nursery room
- Hasuda Municipal Kaizuka nursery
- Hasuda Municipal Kurohama Nursery
- Hasuda Municipal Chuo nursery
- Hasuda Municipal Hasuda South nursery
- Hasuda Municipal East nursery
- Hasuda Municipal Uruido nursery

Elementary school

- Hasuda Municipal Kurohama Kita Elementary school
- Hasuda Municipal Kurohama Elementary School
- Hasuda Municipal Kurohama Nishi Elementary School
- Hasuda Municipal Kurohama Minami Elementary School
- Hasuda Municipal Hasuda North Elementary School
- Hasuda Municipal Hasuda Central Primary School
- Hasuda Municipal Hasuda Minami Elementary School
- Hasuda Municipal Plain Elementary School

Middle Schools

- Hasuda Municipal Kurohama Middle School
- Hasuda Municipal Kurohama Nishi Middle School
- Hasuda Municipal Hasuda Middle School
- Hasuda Municipal Hasuda south Middle School
- Hasuda Municipal Hirano Middle School

High Schools

- Saitama Hasuda Shoin High School

Vocational school

- National Hospital Organization Higashisaitamabyoin University School of Nursing

Special Education School

- Saitama Prefectural Hasuda Special Education School

== Transportation ==
=== Railway ===
JR East – Utsunomiya Line

- Hasuda

=== Bus ===
- Asahi Motor (Asahi Bus)
- Kokusai Kogyo Bus
- Maruken Tsubasa Kotsu (Kenchan Bus)

=== Highway ===
- Tōhoku Expressway – Hasuda Service Area and Smart Interchange
- National Route 122

== Local attractions ==
- Cherry blossom festival (sakura matsuri), held annually in spring, often in early April, to mark the full bloom of the cherry blossom along the Motoara River
- Cosmos festival, held in autumn for cosmos flowers in full bloom in different parts of the city
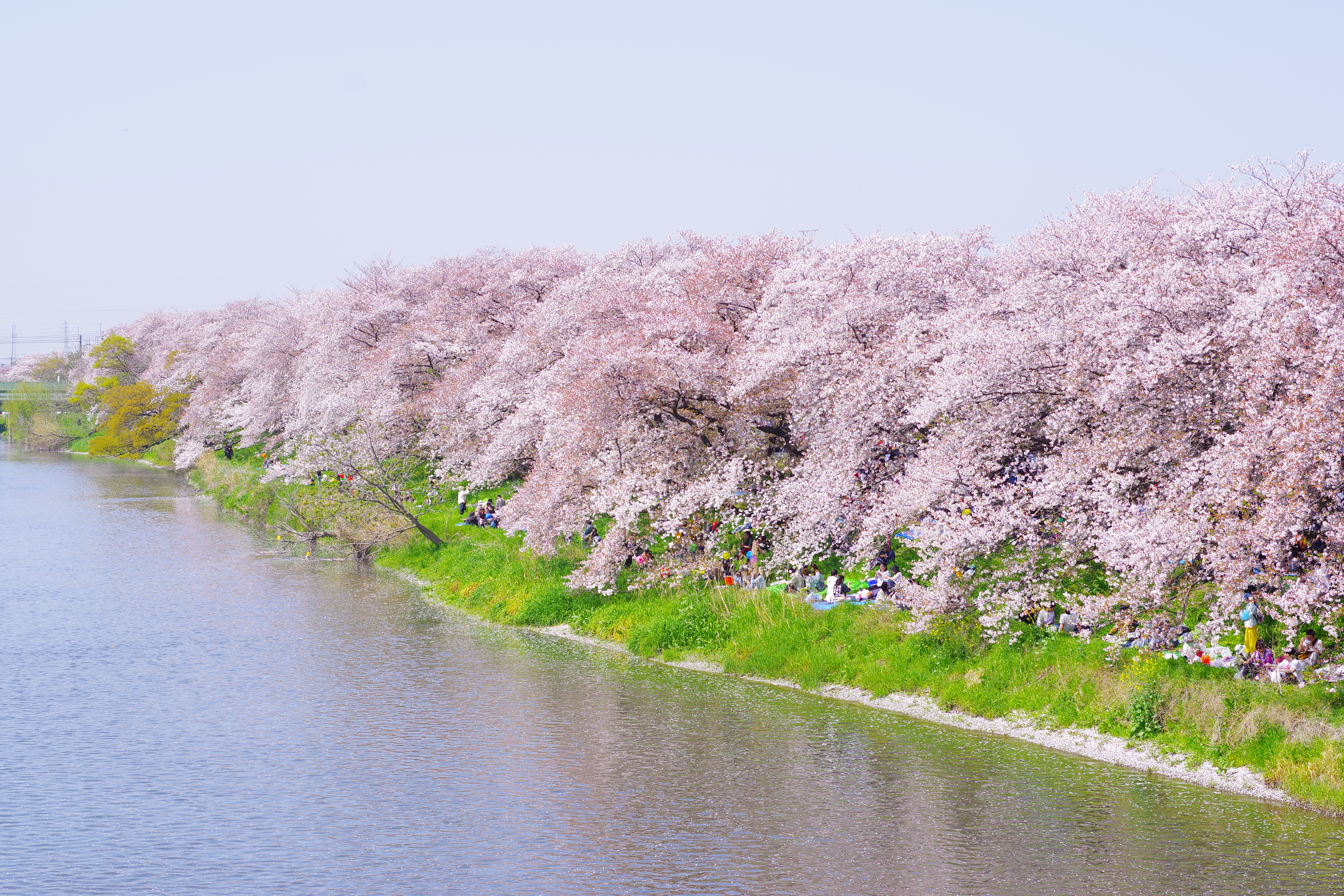
  The cherry blossom (sakura) along Motoara River and a scene from the cherry blossom festival
- Hasuda Cultural Property Museum, a museum for prehistoric and historical artefacts located in the vicinity of city hall
- Kurohama Shell Mound, a Jōmon period National Historic Monument
- Nishijonuma Park, a municipal park known for cherry blossoms and lotus flowers
