= Washinomiya Station =

Railway station in Kuki, Saitama Prefecture, Japan

TI03 Washinomiya Station 鷲宮駅
- Washinomiya Station east entrance, August 2026

General information
- Location: 1-1-17 Washinomiya-Chuo, Kuki-shi, Saitama-ken 340-0216; Japan
- Coordinates: 36.0964°N 139.6569°E
- Operator: Tōbu Railway
- Line: Tōbu Isesaki Line
- Distance: 52.1 km from Tōbu-Dōbutsu-Kōen
- Platforms: 1 island platform + 1 side platform
- Tracks: 3 (2 in use)

Construction
- Structure type: Elevated

Other information
- Station code: TI-03
- Website: Official website

History
- Opened: 6 September 1902

Passengers
- FY2019: 6,723 daily

Services
Preceding station	Tobu Railway	Following station
Kuki TI02 towards Tōbu-Dōbutsu-Kōen	Isesaki Line Section Express Section Semi Express	Hanasaki TI04 towards Tatebayashi
Kuki TI02 towards Tōbu-Dōbutsu-Kōen	Isesaki Line Local	Hanasaki TI04 towards Isesaki
Location
- Location within Saitama Prefecture Location within Japan

Washinomiya Station (鷲宮駅, Washinomiya-eki) is a passenger railway station located in the city of Kuki, Saitama, Japan, operated by the private railway operator Tōbu Railway.

== Lines ==
Washinomiya Station is served by the Tobu Isesaki Line, and is located 52.1 km from the Tokyo terminus of the Tobu Isesaki and Tobu Skytree Line system at Asakusa.

== Station layout ==
Washinomiya Station has an elevated station building, with one island platform and one side platform serving three tracks located on the ground level; however, the central track and one side of the island platform are no longer in use.

=== Platforms ===
1	Tōbu Isesaki Line	for Kuki, Tōbu-Dōbutsu-Kōen, Kasukabe, Kita-Senju, and Asakusa
2	Tōbu Isesaki Line	for Tatebayashi, Ashikagashi, and Ōta

== History ==
Washinomiya Station opened on 6 September 1902.

From 17 March 2012, station numbering was introduced on all Tōbu lines, with Washinomiya Station becoming "TI-03".

== Passenger statistics ==
In fiscal 2019, the station was used by an average of 6723 passengers daily (boarding passengers only).

== Surrounding area ==
- Former Washinomiya Town Hall
- Washinomiya Post Office
- Washinomiya Shrine
- Washinomiya High School

== See also ==
- List of railway stations in Japan
