= Hasegawa Machiko Art Museum =

Art museum in Japan

Coordinates: 35.62799°N 139.64362°E

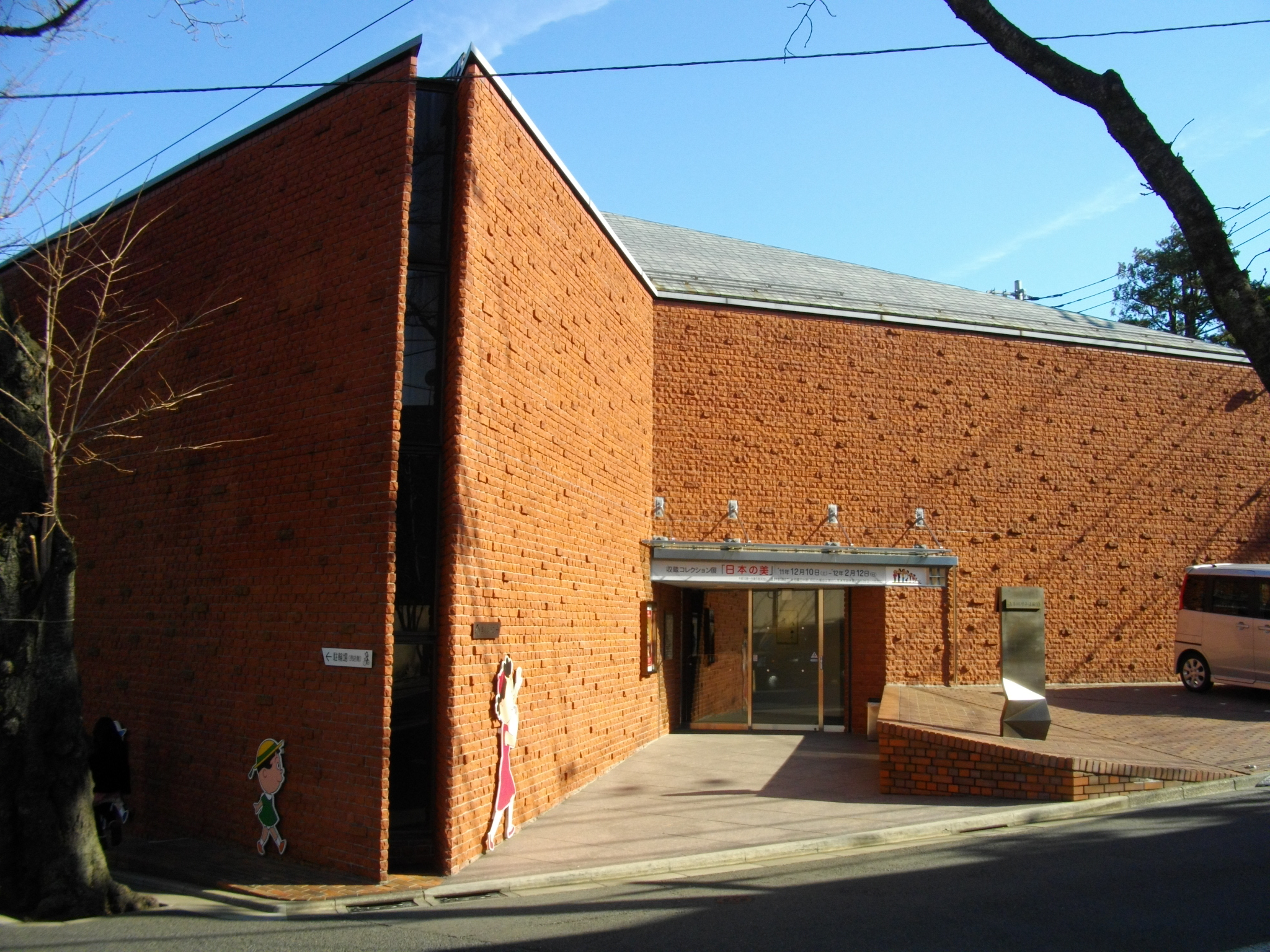
The museum entrance

The Hasegawa Machiko Art Museum (長谷川町子美術館, Hasegawa Machiko Bijutsukan) is an art museum in Setagaya, Tokyo, Japan.

From 1946 until 1974, Machiko Hasegawa drew the comic strip Sazae-san about an ordinary Japanese family led by a good-natured mother and wife, Sazae. The strip was a huge success and for most of its run appeared daily in the Asahi Shimbun. While entirely original and thoroughly Japanese, Sazae-san's popularity in Japan is comparable to the American strip Peanuts. Hasegawa was also an art collector, and her collection along with additions by her sister Mariko is housed in the museum.

The museum showcases original drawings, clay dolls, and paintings, as well as works by Western and Japanese artists.

== Access ==
- Walk for about 7 minutes from Sakura-shimmachi Station in Tokyu Den-en-toshi Line via Sazae-san Street.
- Located in 1-30-6 Sakurashimmachi, Setagaya-ku, Tokyo.
