= Toro Station =

Railway station in Saitama, Japan

Toro 土呂駅
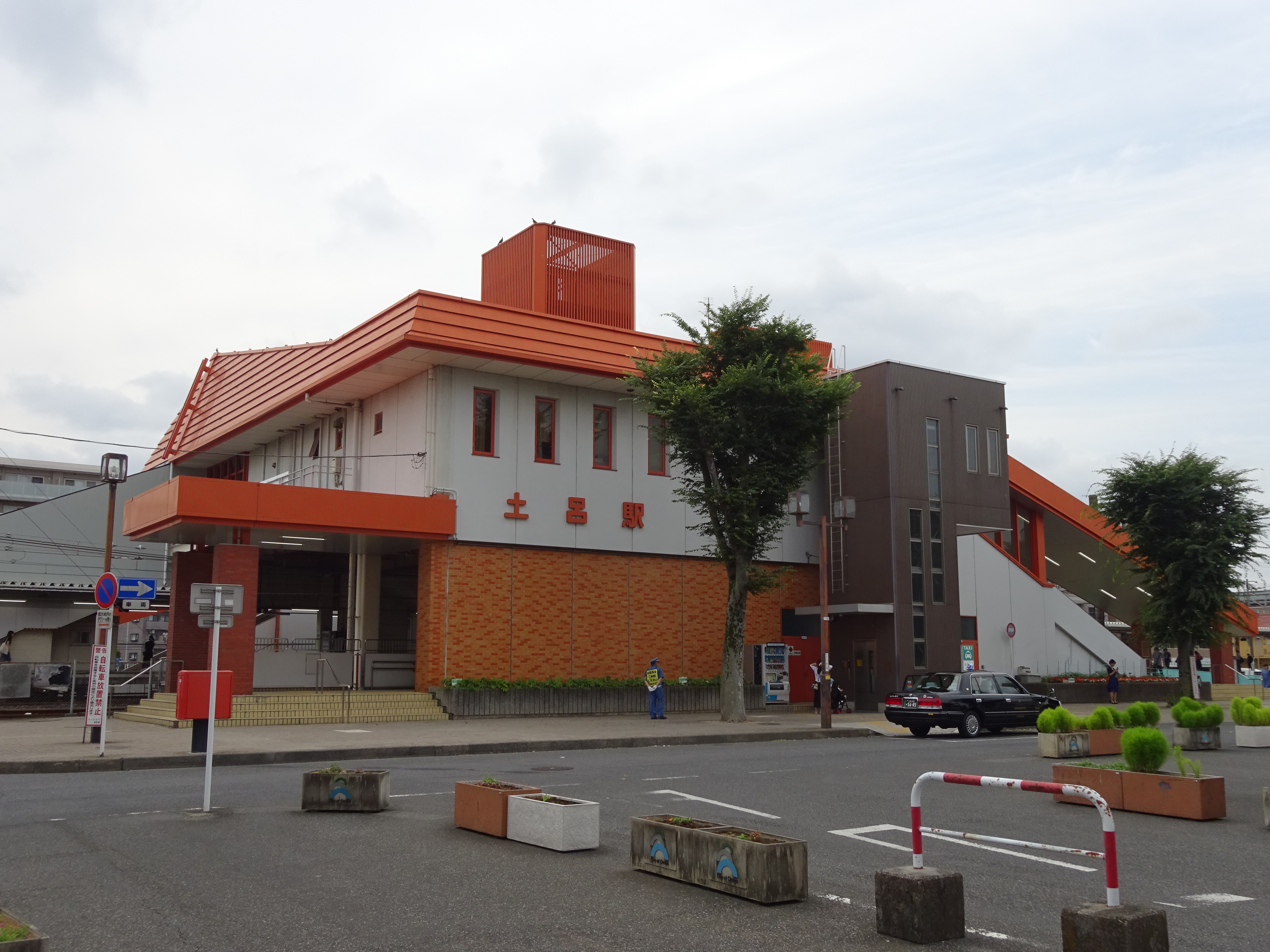
- Toro Station, June 2017

General information
- Location: 1-14 Toro, Kita-ku, Saitama-shi, Saitama-ken 331-0804; Japan
- Coordinates: 35.9322°N 139.6322°E
- Operator: JR East
- Line: Tōhoku Main Line
- Distance: 33.3 km from Tokyo
- Platforms: 1 island platform
- Connections: Bus stop

Other information
- Status: Staffed
- Website: Official website

History
- Opened: 1 October 1983

Passengers
- FY2019: 15,861 (daily, boarding only)

Services
| Preceding station | JR East | Following station |
|---|---|---|
| Ōmiya towards Tokyo | Utsunomiya Line Local | Higashi-Ōmiya towards Kuroiso |
| Ōmiya towards Odawara or Zushi | Shōnan–Shinjuku Line Local | Higashi-Ōmiya towards Utsunomiya |
Location
- Location within Saitama Prefecture Location within Japan

Toro Station (土呂駅, Toro-eki) is a passenger railway station on the Tōhoku Main Line (Utsunomiya Line) located in Kita-ku, Saitama, Saitama Prefecture, Japan, operated by East Japan Railway Company (JR East).

== Lines ==
Toro Station is served by the Tōhoku Main Line (Utsunomiya Line) and the Shōnan-Shinjuku Line, and lies 33.3 kilometers from the starting point of the Tōhoku Main Line at Tokyo.

== Station layout ==
This station has an elevated station building with one island platform underneath. The station is staffed.

=== Platforms ===
| 1 | ■ Utsunomiya Line | for Oyama, Utsunomiya, Kuroiso |
| 3 | ■ Utsunomiya Line (Ueno-Tokyo Line) | for Ōmiya, Ueno, Tokyo, Yokohama, Atami, Numazu and Itō (via Tōkaidō Line and Itō Line) |
| 3 | ■ Shōnan–Shinjuku Line | for Ōmiya, Shinjuku, Yokohama, Ōfuna and Zushi (via Yokosuka Line) |

== History ==
Toro Station opened on 1 October 1983. With the privatization of JNR on 1 April 1987, the station came under the control of JR East.

== Passenger statistics ==
In fiscal 2019, the station was used by an average of 15,861 passengers daily (boarding passengers only).

== Surrounding area ==
- Saitama City, Kita-ku Ward Office
- Toro Nishi-guchi Post Office

== See also ==
- List of railway stations in Japan
