= Hasuda Station =

Railway station in Hasuda, Saitama Prefecture, Japan

Hasuda Station 蓮田駅
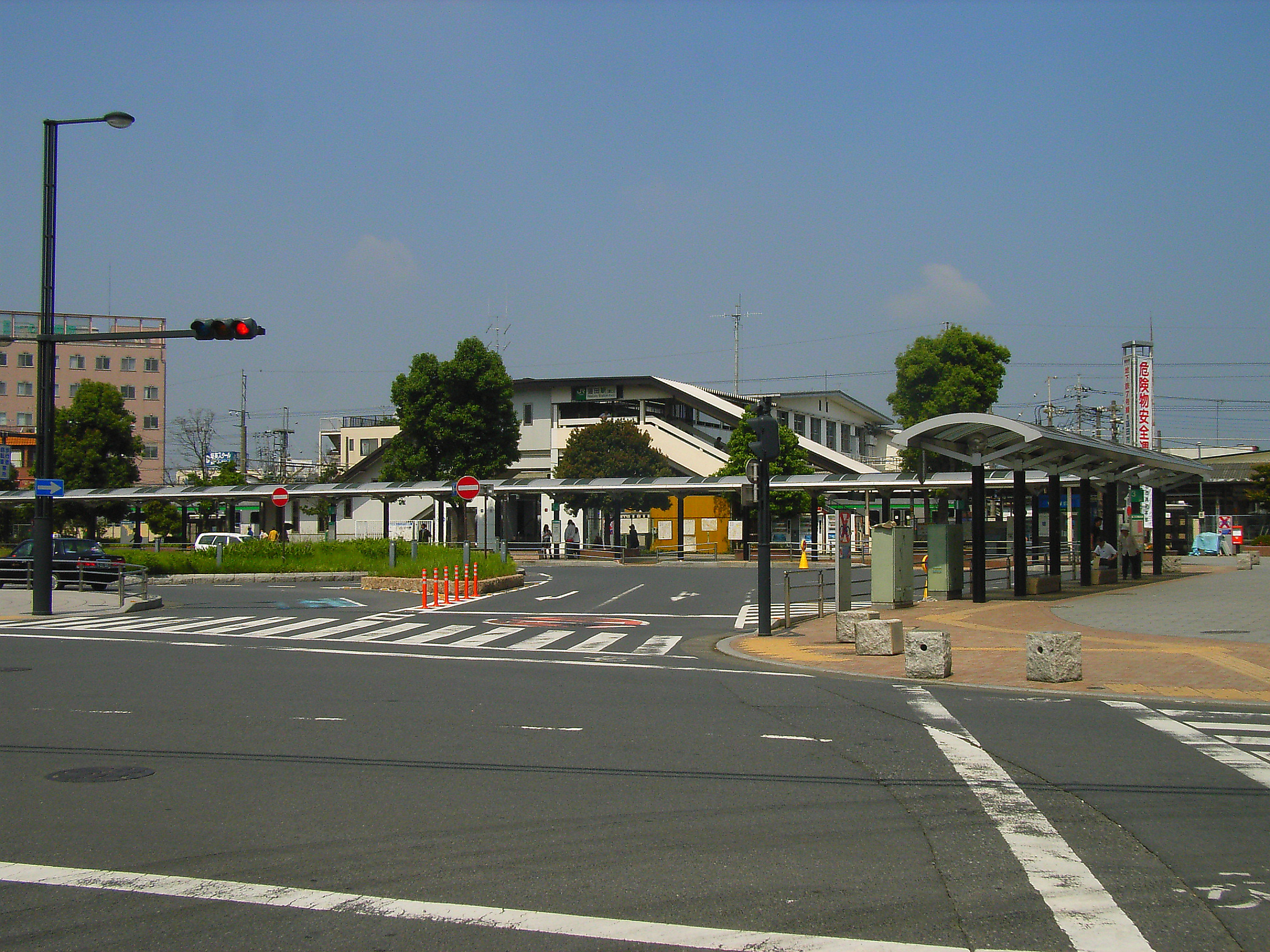
- East side of the station, June 2005

General information
- Location: Honchō, Hasuda-shi, Saitama-ken 348-0111; Japan
- Coordinates: 35.9811°N 139.6526°E
- Operator: JR East
- Line: Tōhoku Main Line
- Platforms: 1 side + 1 island platform
- Connections: Bus terminal

Other information
- Status: Staffed (Midori no Madoguchi)
- Website: www.jreast.co.jp/estation/station/info.aspx?StationCd=1225

History
- Opened: 16 July 1885

Passengers
- FY2019: 20,804

Services
Preceding station	JR East	Following station
Higashi-Ōmiya One-way operation	Utsunomiya Line Rapid Rabbit	Kuki towards Utsunomiya
Higashi-Ōmiya towards Tokyo	Utsunomiya Line Local	Shiraoka towards Kuroiso
Higashi-Ōmiya towards Zushi	Shōnan–Shinjuku Line Rapid	Kuki towards Utsunomiya
Higashi-Ōmiya towards Zushi	Shōnan–Shinjuku Line Local	Shiraoka towards Utsunomiya
Location
- Location within Saitama Prefecture Location within Japan

Hasuda Station (蓮田駅, Hasuda-eki) is a passenger railway station located in the city of Hasuda, Saitama, Japan, operated by East Japan Railway Company (JR East).

== Lines ==
Hasuda Station is served by the Tōhoku Main Line (Utsunomiya Line) and the Shōnan-Shinjuku Line, and lies 39.2 kilometers from the starting point of the line at Tokyo.

== Station layout ==
This station consists of an elevated station building with one ground-level side platform and one ground-level island platform serving a total of three tracks. The station has a Midori no Madoguchi staffed ticket office.

=== Platforms ===
1	■ Utsunomiya Line	for Oyama, Utsunomiya, Kuroiso
2	■ Utsunomiya Line	(for both directions)
3	■ Utsunomiya Line (Ueno-Tokyo Line)	for Ōmiya, Ueno, Tokyo, Yokohama, Atami, Numazu and Ito (via Tokaido Line and Ito Line)
3	■ Shōnan–Shinjuku Line	for Ōmiya, Shinjuku, Yokohama, Ōfuna and Zushi (via Yokosuka Line)

== History ==
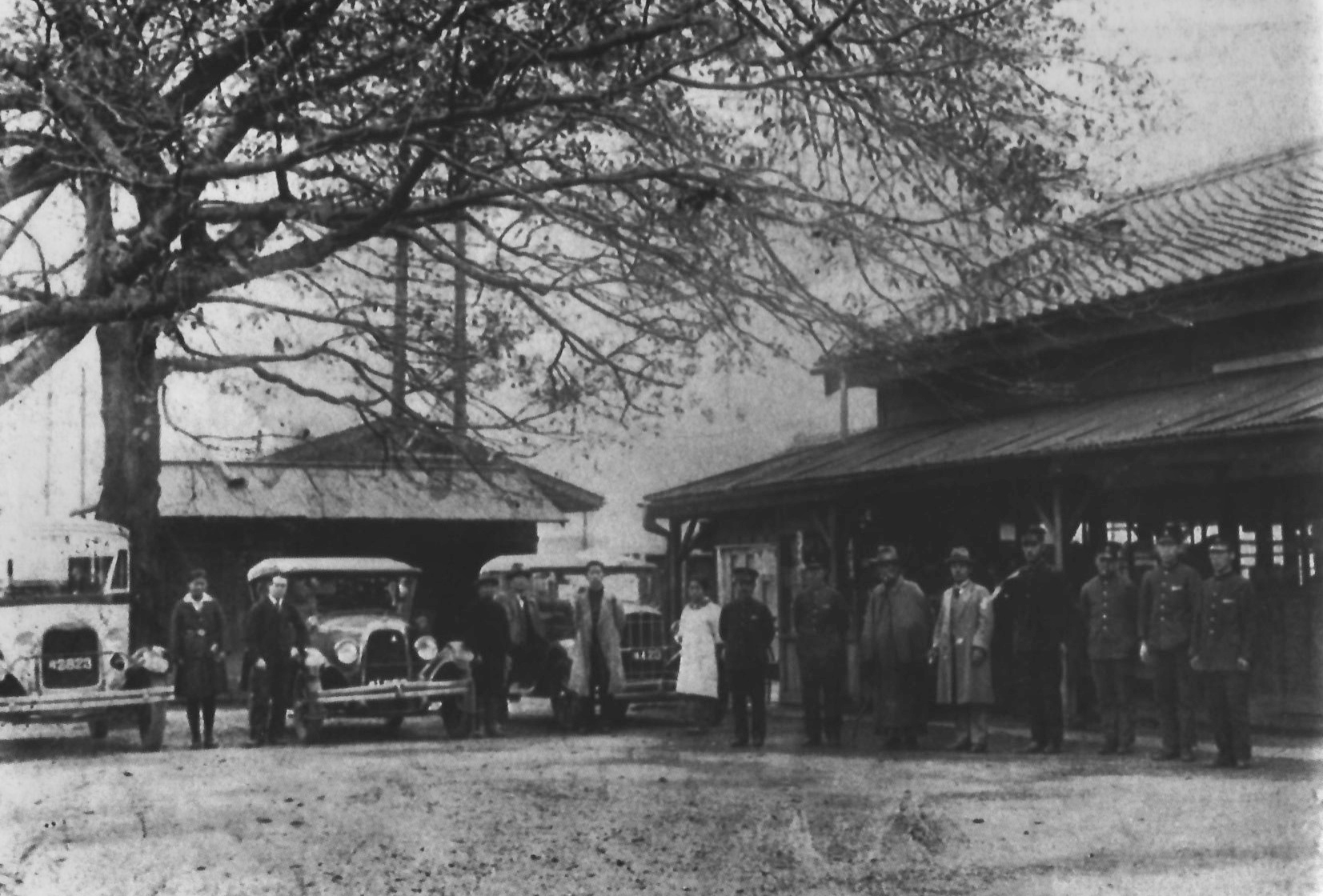
The west entrance of Hasuda Station in 1933

Hasuda Station opened on 16 July 1885. With the privatization of JNR on 1 April 1987, the station came under the control of JR East.

== Passenger statistics ==
In fiscal 2019, the station was used by an average of 20,804 passengers daily (boarding passengers only).

The passenger figures for previous years are as shown below.

Fiscal year	Daily average
2000	22,764
2005	21,576
2010	21,164
2015	21,031

== Surrounding area ==
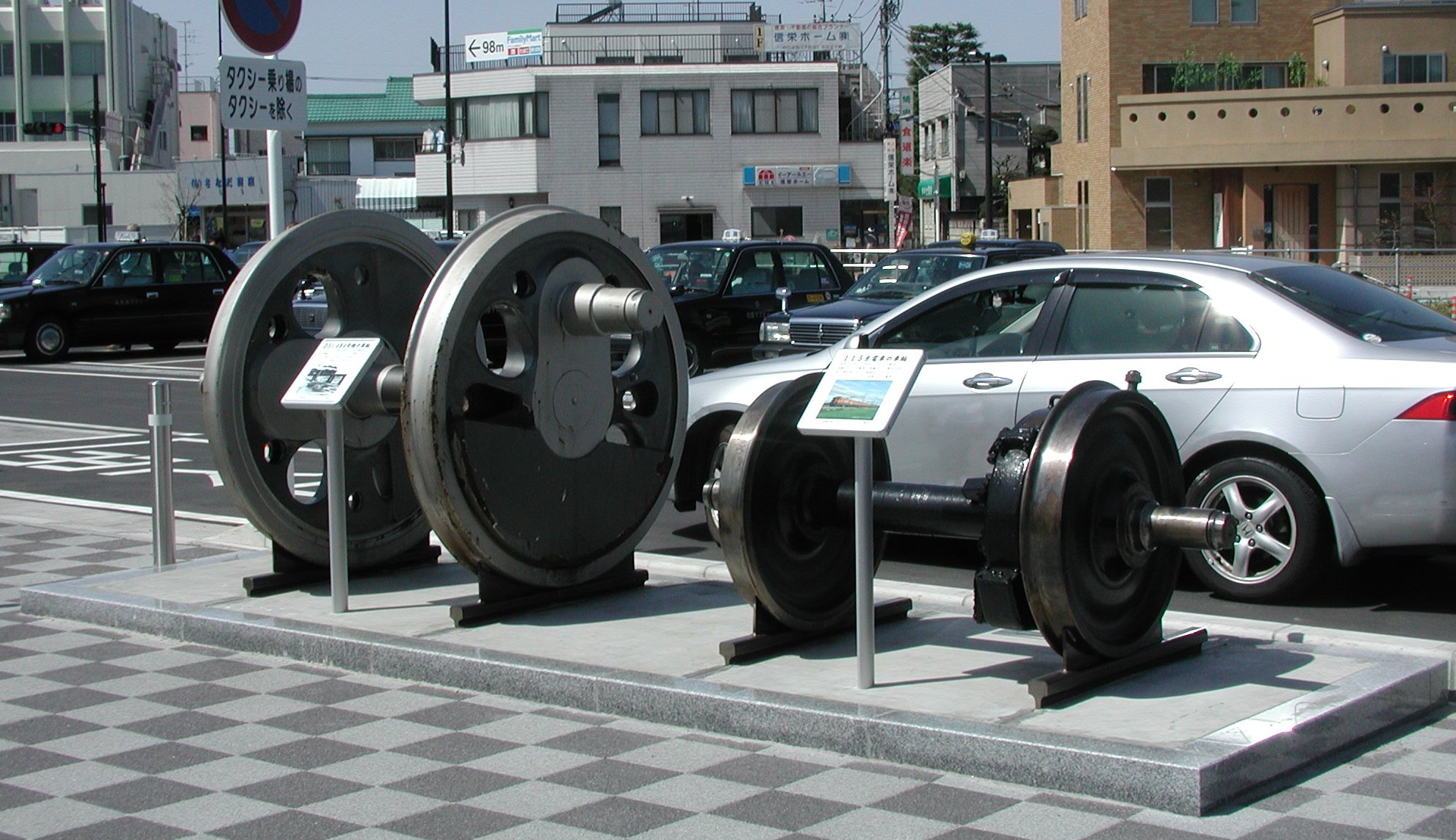
West side forecourt monument, April 2013

A monument was erected on the west side station forecourt, consisting of the driving wheels of former JNR Class D51 steam locomotive D51 484 and the wheels of a former 115 series electric multiple unit train.

- National Route 122
- University of Human Arts and Sciences
- Nihon Pharmaceutical University
