= Kinuta Park =

Park located in Setagaya, Tokyo

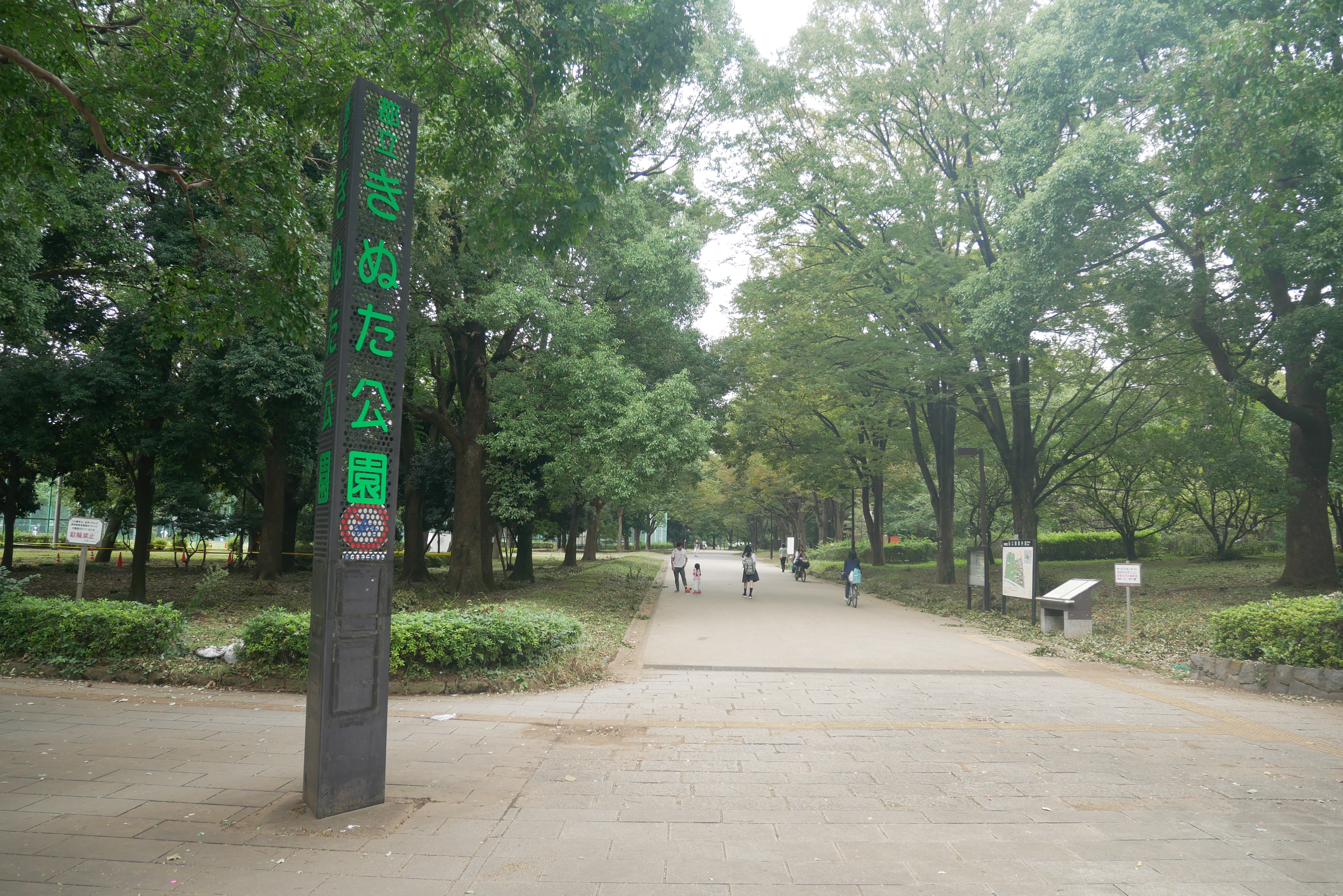
- Park entrance, October 2018
- Interactive map of Kinuta Park
- Location: Setagaya, Tokyo, Japan
- Coordinates: 35°37′50″N 139°37′13″E
- Area: 390,000 square metres (96 acres)
- Opened: 1957
- Public transit: Seijōgakuen-Mae Station (Odakyu Odawara Line)

Kinuta Park (砧公園, Kinuta Kōen) is a park in Setagaya, Tokyo. The total area is 39 hectares (390,000 m^{2}), about two-thirds of which (24 hectares (240,000 m^{2})) is grass.

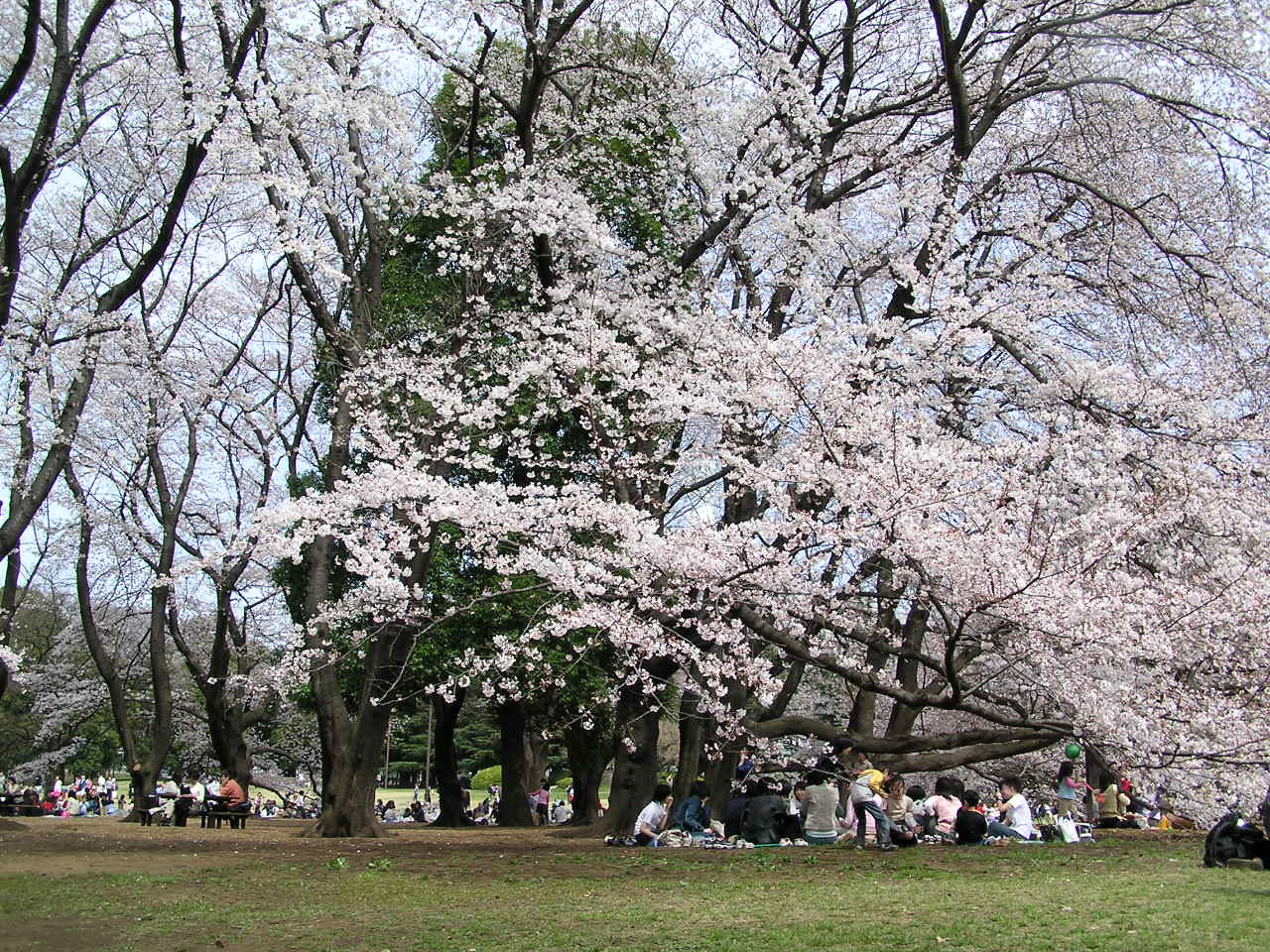
Someyoshino cherry blossoms in Kinuta Park, March 2004

Kinuta Park is famous for its cherry blossom (sakura) viewing. It has at least three varieties—Someiyoshino (photo), Yamazakura, and Yaezakura—and this makes for a relatively long hanami viewing season of over two weeks.

== Facilities ==
There are baseball fields, soccer fields, cycling courses and the Setagaya Art Museum. The 1.66 km cycling course doubles as a walking course outside the hours of 9 am and 4 pm.

== History ==
The park was a wooded area. It was planned as a park in 1935 ahead of the 2,600th anniversary of the legendary founding of Japan by Emperor Jimmu, the mythical first emperor of Japan. After Japan was awarded the 1940 Summer Olympics in 1936 it was planned that the Olympic village would have built either here in the Todoroki Gorge area. After the start of the Second Sino-Japanese War in 1937 the Olympics were forfeited to Helsinki in Finland, (the runner-up in the bidding process) but were later cancelled entirely due to World War II.

In 1957 the area became a public golf course, which was later closed and turned into the park in its current form. The park still resembles a golf course when seen from above.

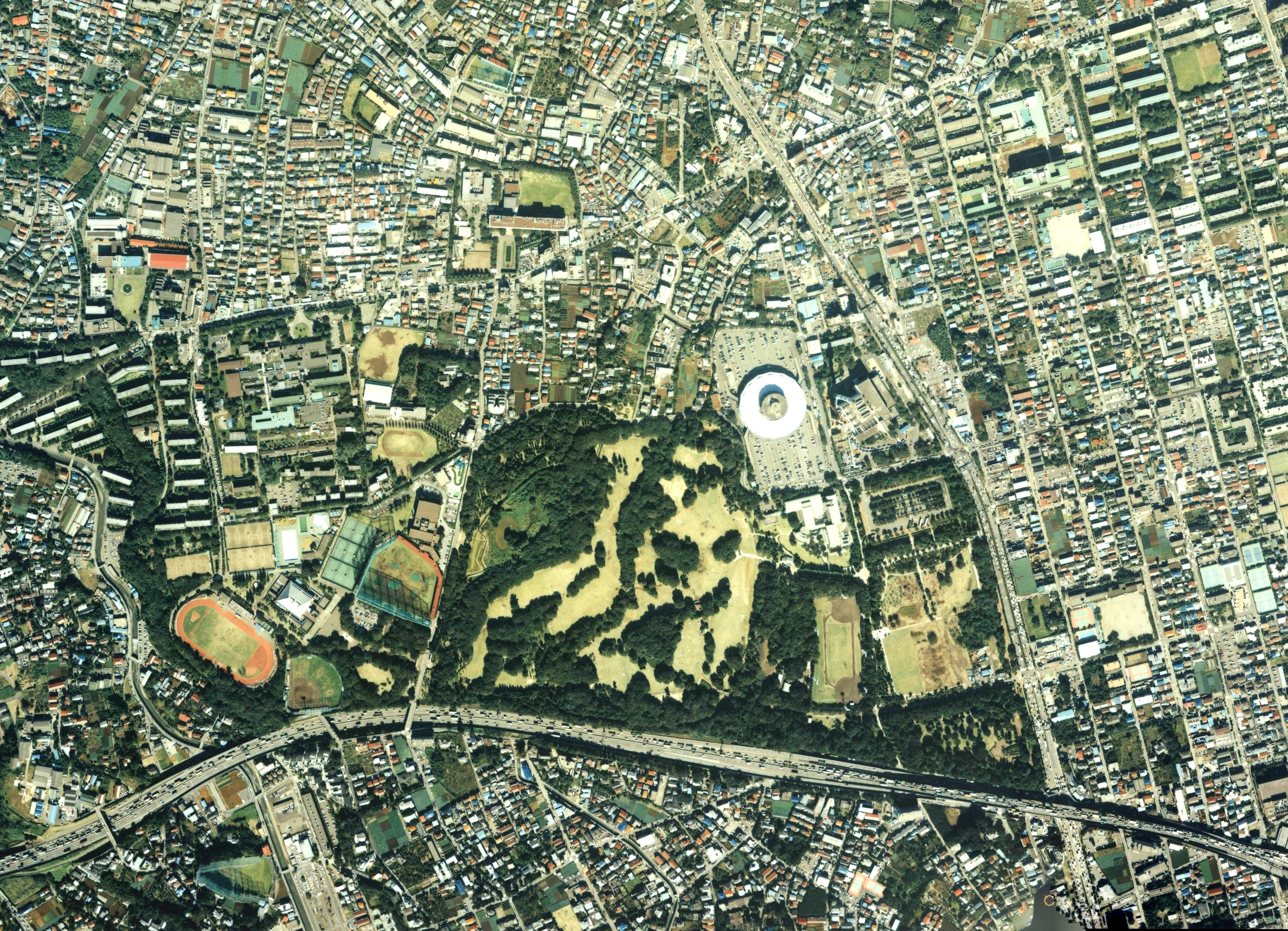
Aerial photograph of the park in 1989

== Access ==
The Tōmei Expressway (東名高速道路, Tōmei Kōsoku Dōro) runs along the south side; Kampachi (環八, the #8 ring road), along the east. The Tōmei Expressway ends at that intersection.
