= Kuki Station (Saitama) =

Railway station in Kuki, Saitama Prefecture, Japan

TI02 Kuki Station 久喜駅
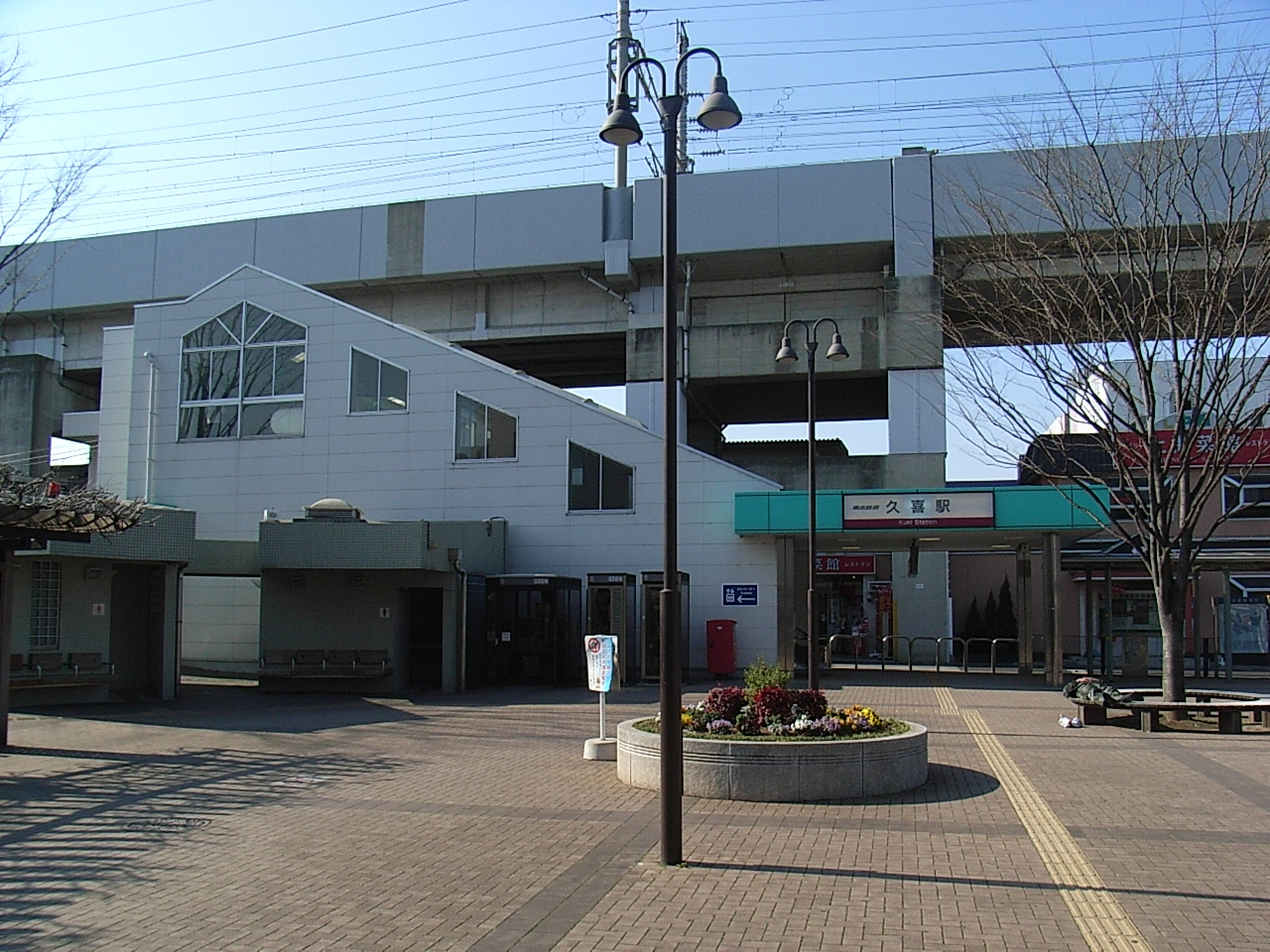
- Kuki Station east entrance in February 2007

General information
- Location: 2-1-1 Kuki-chuo, Kuki-shi, Saitama-ken; Japan
- Coordinates: 36°3′56.51″N 139°40′38.24″E
- Operator: JR East; Tōbu Railway
- Lines: Tōhoku Main Line; Tōbu Isesaki Line
- Platforms: 1 side + 1 island platform (JR East); 2 island platforms (Tobu)

Other information
- Station code: TI-02 (Tobu)

History
- Opened: 16 July 1885

Passengers
- FY2019: 35,347 (JR East); 51,656 (Tobu)

Services
Preceding station	JR East	Following station
Hasuda One-way operation	Utsunomiya Line Rapid Rabbit	Koga towards Utsunomiya
Shin-Shiraoka towards Tokyo	Utsunomiya Line Local	Higashi-Washinomiya towards Kuroiso
Hasuda towards Zushi	Shōnan–Shinjuku Line Rapid	Koga towards Utsunomiya
Shin-Shiraoka towards Zushi	Shōnan–Shinjuku Line Local	Higashi-Washinomiya towards Utsunomiya
Preceding station	Tobu Railway	Following station
Tōbu-Dōbutsu-Kōen TS30 towards Asakusa	Ryomo	Kazo TI05 towards Kuzū, Akagi or Isesaki
Tōbu-Dōbutsu-Kōen TS30 towards Ebisu	TH Liner	Terminus
Wado TI01 towards Tōbu-Dōbutsu-Kōen	Isesaki Line Express	Terminus
Wado TI01 towards Tōbu-Dōbutsu-Kōen	Isesaki Line Section Express	Washinomiya TI03 towards Tatebayashi
Wado TI01 towards Tōbu-Dōbutsu-Kōen	Isesaki Line Semi Express	Terminus
Wado TI01 towards Tōbu-Dōbutsu-Kōen	Isesaki Line Section Semi Express	Washinomiya TI03 towards Tatebayashi
Wado TI01 towards Tōbu-Dōbutsu-Kōen	Isesaki Line Local	Washinomiya TI03 towards Isesaki
Location
- Location within Saitama Prefecture Location within Japan

Kuki Station (久喜駅, Kuki-eki) is a passenger railway station located in the city of Kuki, Saitama, Japan, operated jointly by East Japan Railway Company (JR East) and the private railway operator Tōbu Railway.

== Lines ==
Kuki Station is served by the Tōbu Isesaki Line, and is 47.7 km from the starting point of the Isesaki Line at Asakusa. It is also a station on the JR East Tōhoku Main Line (Utsunomiya Line) and is 48.9 km from the starting point of that line at Tokyo Station.

== Station layout ==
=== JR East ===
The JR East portion of the station has one ground-level island platform and one ground-level side platform serving three tracks, connected to the station building by a footbridge. The station has a “Midori no Madoguchi” staffed ticket office.

=== Platforms ===
1, 2	■ Utsunomiya Line	for Oyama, Utsunomiya, Kuroiso
3	■ Utsunomiya Line (Ueno-Tokyo Line)	for Ōmiya, Ueno, Tokyo, Yokohama, Atami, Numazu and Itō (via Tōkaidō Line and Itō Line)
3	■ Shōnan–Shinjuku Line	for Ōmiya, Shinjuku, Yokohama, Ōfuna and Zushi (via Yokosuka Line)

=== Tobu ===
The Tōbu Station consists of two island platform serving four tracks, connected to the station building by a footbridge.

=== Platforms ===
1	Tōbu Isesaki Line	for Tatebayashi, Ōta, Isesaki, and Akagi
2	Tōbu Isesaki Line	for Tatebayashi, Ōta, Isesaki, and Akagi
2	Tōbu Isesaki Line	for Tōbu-Dōbutsu-Kōen, Kasukabe, Kita-Senju, and Asakusa (Sectional Semi-Express during daytime only)
3/4	Tōbu Isesaki Line	for Tōbu-Dōbutsu-Kōen, Kasukabe, Kita-Senju, and Asakusa; Hibiya Line for Naka-Meguro; Hanzōmon Line for Ōtemachi and Shibuya; Den-en-toshi Line for Chūō-rinkan

== History ==
The JR East Tōhoku Line (Utsunomiya Line) station opened on 16 July 1885. The Tōbu station opened on 27 August 1899. From 17 March 2012, station numbering was introduced on all Tōbu lines, with Kuki Station becoming "TI-02".

== Passenger statistics ==
In fiscal 2019, the Tōbu station was used by an average of 51,656 passengers daily (boarding passengers only). The JR portion of the station was used by an average of 35,347 passengers daily (boarding passengers only).

== See also ==
- List of railway stations in Japan
