= Fugui =

Fugui is an atonal pinyin romanization of various Chinese names and words.

It may refer to:

== Places ==
- Cape Fugui (富貴), the northernmost point on Taiwan in Shimen District, New Taipei City
- Cape Fugui Lighthouse in Shimen District, New Taipei City
- Fugui Railway Station (富貴) in Hengshan, a town in Hsinchu County on Taiwan

== People ==
- Xu Fugui (福貴), the protagonist of the novel To Live and the 1994 film adaptation To Live
- Fugui (福貴), the protagonist of the CCTV series Magic Boy Kitchener
- John Moffat Fugui, a politician in the Solomon Islands
