= Fukui =

Fukui (Japanese: 福井) is a Japanese name meaning "fortunate" or sometimes "one who is from the Fukui prefecture". It may refer to:

== Places ==
- Fukui Domain, a part of the Japanese han system during the Edo period
- Fukui Prefecture, a prefecture of Japan located in the Chūbu region on Honshū island
  - Fukui (city), the capital city of the prefecture
    - Fukui Station (Fukui), the main train station of the city of Fukui
- Fukui Station (Okayama), train station in Kurashiki, Okayama
- Fukui Station (Tochigi), train station in Ashikaga, Tochigi

== People ==
- Fukui (surname)

== Others ==
- 6924 Fukui, an Outer Main-belt asteroid

== See also ==
- Fugui (disambiguation)
- Fukui Station (disambiguation)
