= Shimen District =

District in New Taipei, Taiwan

Shimen 石門區 Sekimon
- District
- Shimen District
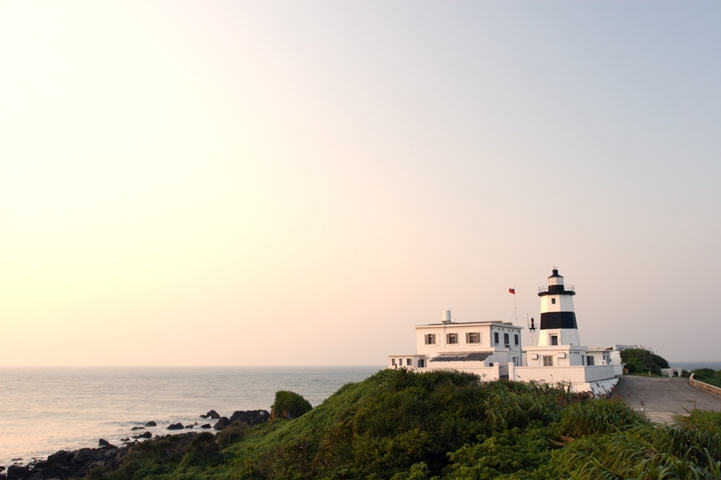
- The Fuguijiao Lighthouse at Taiwan's northernmost point

- Location of Shimen in New Taipei City
- Coordinates: 25°16′07″N 121°34′17″E
- Country: Republic of China (Taiwan)
- Region: Northern Taiwan
- Special municipality: New Taipei City

Area
  - Total: 51.26 km^{2} (19.79 sq mi)

Population (March 2023)
  - Total: 10,902
- Time zone: UTC+8 (CST)
- Postal code: 253
- Website: www.shimen.ntpc.gov.tw (in Chinese)

Shimen District
- Chinese: 石門區
- Literal meaning: Stone Gate
Transcriptions
Standard Mandarin
- Hanyu Pinyin: Shímén Qū
- Bopomofo: ㄕˊ ㄇㄣˊ ㄑㄩ
- Wade–Giles: Shih²-mên² Ch'ü¹
- Tongyong Pinyin: Shíhmén Cyu
Hakka
- Romanization: Sa̍k-mùn Khî
Southern Min
- Hokkien POJ: Chio̍h-mn̂g-khu

Shimen District (Chinese: 石門區; pinyin: Shímén Qū; Pe̍h-ōe-jī: Chio̍h-mn̂g-khu), also known as Sekimon, is a sparsely populated rural district in the northern part of New Taipei City in northern Taiwan. It is part of the North Coast and Guanyinshan National Scenic Area and includes the island of Taiwan's northernmost point, Cape Fugui. (Note: The true northernmost point in control of the Republic of China is the small Beigu Islet in Lienchiang County.)

== History ==
While known to earlier explorers, including the Dutch, the area was first explicitly mentioned in Chinese annals in 1694 as Shimenshan (石門山; 'Stone Gate Mountain'). During the period of Imperial Japanese rule, Shimen was called Sekimon Village (石門庄), and was governed under Tansui District of Taihoku Prefecture. In 1945 when the Kuomintang took over administration of Taiwan the area became Shimen Rural Township, a part of Taipei County. With the reorganization of Taipei County in 2010, Shimen became a district of the newly created New Taipei City.

== Geography ==
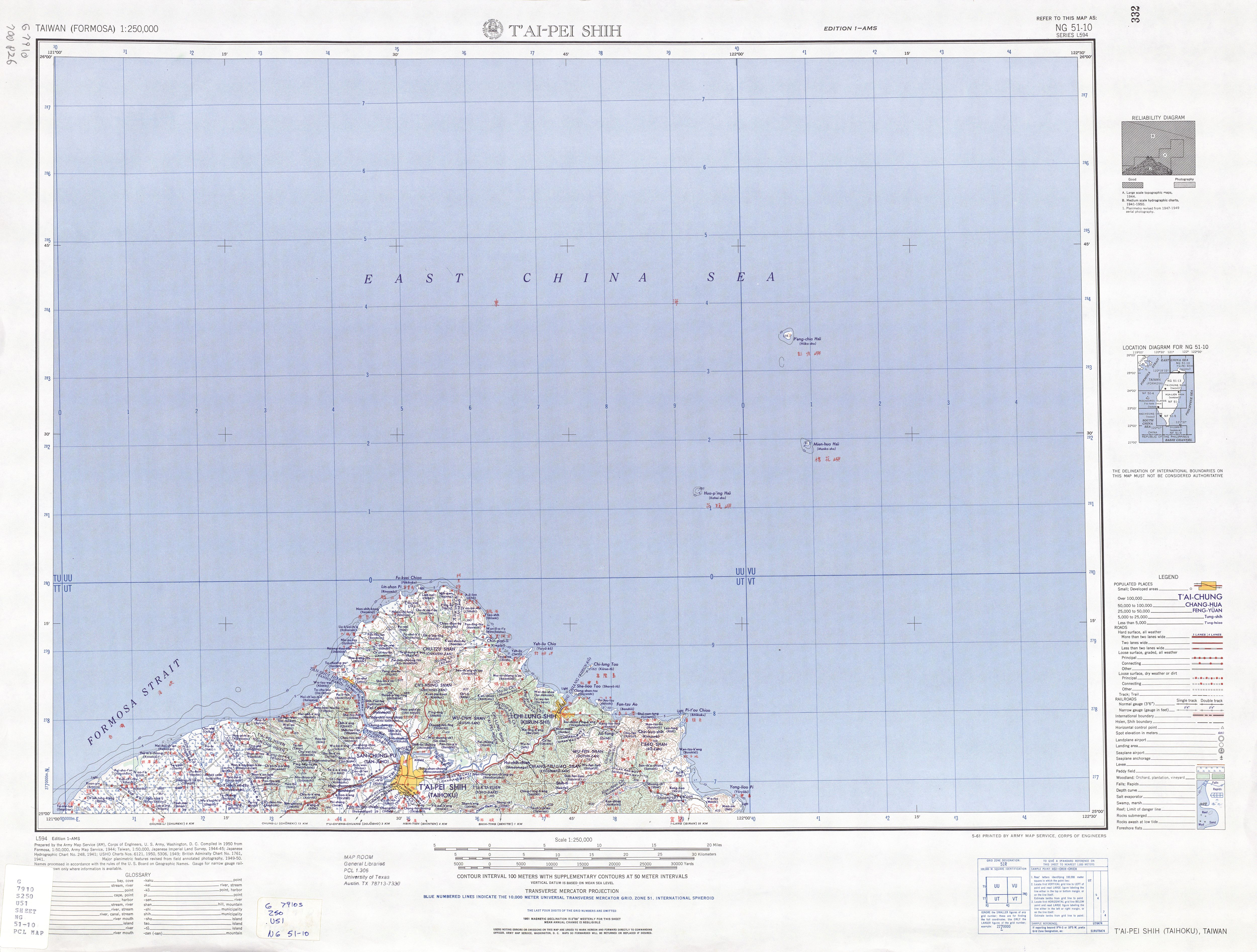
Map including Shimen (labeled as Shih-men (Sekimon) 石門) (1950)

The interior of Shimen is predominantly mountainous, with small areas of flat land on the coast. The district is bordered to the north by the East China Sea, to the southwest by Sanzhi District, and to the southeast by Jinshan District.

== Administration ==
Shimen is part of New Taipei City, a special municipality under the Republic of China government. The district itself is divided into nine villages: Shanxi (山溪里), Shimen (石門里), Laomei (老梅里), Jianlu (尖鹿里), Maolin (茂林里), Caoli (草里里), Qianhua/Cianhua (乾華里), Fuji (富基里), and Demao (德茂里).

== Economy ==
Tourism is a major contributor to the economy of Shimen, which also produces a number of agricultural goods including mandarins, peanuts, and tea.

== Education ==
Shimen has one junior high school, Shimen Junior High, and three elementary schools; Shimen, Laomei and Qianhua.

== Tourist attractions ==
=== Historical buildings ===
The Fuguijiao Lighthouse is located at Cape Fugui.

=== Nature ===
Shimen is home to Baisha Bay.

=== Festivals ===
Shimen has also been home to an annual kite festival since the year 2000, drawing competitors from around the world.

=== Others ===
- Fuji Fishing Port
- Temple of the Eighteen Lords

== Infrastructure ==
Shimen is the site location for Taiwan's first nuclear power plant, the Jinshan Nuclear Power Plant.

== Transportation ==
The main road route through the district is the Provincial Highway 2. It is also served by a number of other county-level roads. There is no rail transportation in the district.

== See also ==
- New Taipei City
- List of Taiwanese superlatives
