= 福井 =

福井, meaning “fortune, well”, may refer to:

- Bokjeong, the Korean transliteration
  - Bokjeong station
- Fukui (disambiguation), the Japanese transliteration
