= Magic Boy =

Magic Boy may refer to:

- Magic Boy (film), a 1959 Japanese animated film
- Magic Boy (video game), a 1993 video game
- Magical boy, a subgenre of Japanese fantasy media

== See also ==
- Magic Boy Kitchener, a Chinese animated television series
