= List of Taiwanese superlatives =

This is a list of Taiwanese superlatives.

Extreme points of Taiwan (approximate)

== Geography ==
Geography
Record	Holder	Location	Coordinates/ Measurement	References
Northernmost tip (Main island)	Cape Fugui	Shimen District, New Taipei City	25° 18' 20" N	
Northernmost tip (Taiwan, Penghu, Kinmen and Matsu)	Beigu Islet (北固礁)	Dongyin Township, Lienchiang County	26° 23' N	
Northernmost tip (Exclude Fujian and claims on Senkaku)	Pengjia Islet	Zhongzheng District, Keelung	25° 37' 46" N	
Southernmost tip (Mainland)	Eluanbi	Hengchun Township, Pingtung County	21° 53' 50" N	
Easternmost tip (Main island)	Cape of San Diego	Gongliao District, New Taipei City	121° 59' 15" E	
Southernmost tip (Islands close to Taiwan Island)	Qixingyan (Taiwan)	Pingtung County	21° 45' 32" N	
Easternmost tip (Including Islands)	Pingfong Rock (屏風岩), east of Mien-hwa Islet	Zhongzheng District, Keelung	122° 06' 25" E	
Easternmost tip (Including claims on Senkaku)	Taishō-tō (大正島) (claimed as Chiwei Isle (赤尾嶼))	Senkaku Islands (claimed as part of Toucheng Township, Yilan County)	124° 34' E	
Westernmost tip (Islands close to Taiwan Island; excluding Penghu/Pescadores)	Wai San Ding Alluvion (外傘頂洲)	Kouhu Township, Yunlin County	120° 4' 0" E	
Westernmost tip (exclude Spratly Islands)	Pratas Island	Cijin District, Kaohsiung	116° 42' 0" E	
Westernmost tip & Southernmost tip (Taiwan, Penghu, Kinmen, Matsu)	Taiping Island	Cijin District, Kaohsiung	114° 21' 57" E	disputed
Highest mountain	Mount Yu	Xinyi Township, Nantou County; Taoyuan District, Kaohsiung; Alishan Township, Chiayi County	3,952 m	
Longest river	Zhuoshui River	Nantou County, Chiayi County, Changhua County, Yunlin County	186 km	
Largest lake	Sun Moon Lake	Yuchi Township, Nantou County	8.4 km^{2}	
Largest plain	Chianan Plain	Yunlin County, Chiayi County, Tainan, Kaohsiung, Changhua County	2,500 km^{2}	

== Ecology ==
Biology
Record	Holder	Location	Statistics	References
Longest-living elephant in captivity	Lin Wang	Taipei Zoo	86 years old	
Oldest alligator fossil	Penghu Malayan gharial fossil	Penghu	approx. 14 million years old	
Oldest domesticated dog fossil	Dabenkeng culture dog fossil	Archaeological Site, Nanguan Village, Shanhua District, Tainan	approx. 5,000 years old	
Oldest trees	Hiyama Chinmoku (檜山神木 Guishan Shenmu)	Wufeng Township, Hsinchu County and Tai'an Township, Miaoli County	approx. 4,600 years old	

== Demography ==
People
Record	Holder	Location	Statistics	References
Richest person	Tsai Eng-meng	Taiwan	US$10.6 billion	May 30, 2013
Longest human chain	228 Hand-in-Hand Rally	Heping Island, Keelung to Jiadong Township, Pingtung County	approx. 500 km	

Demography
Record	Holder	Statistics	References
Largest-scale public march	2005 anti-China march	approx. 1 million people	
Sports
Record	Holder	Date	References
First MLB player from Taiwan	Chin-Feng Chen	September 14, 2002	
First MLB pitcher from Taiwan	Chin-hui Tsao	July 25, 2003	

== Structures ==
Architecture
Record	Holder	Statistics	References
Tallest building	Taipei 101	509.2 m	
Transportation
Record	Holder	Statistics	References
Longest tunnel	Taipei Metro Bannan Line	28.2 km	
Longest tunnel (mountain)	Xueshan Tunnel	12.9 km	
Longest bridge	THSR Changhua–Kaohsiung Viaduct	157.317 km	
Longest bridge (crossing waterbody)	Penghu Great Bridge	5,541 m	
