= Baisha Bay =

Bay in Shimen, New Taipei, Taiwan

Baisha Bay 白沙灣海水浴場
- beach
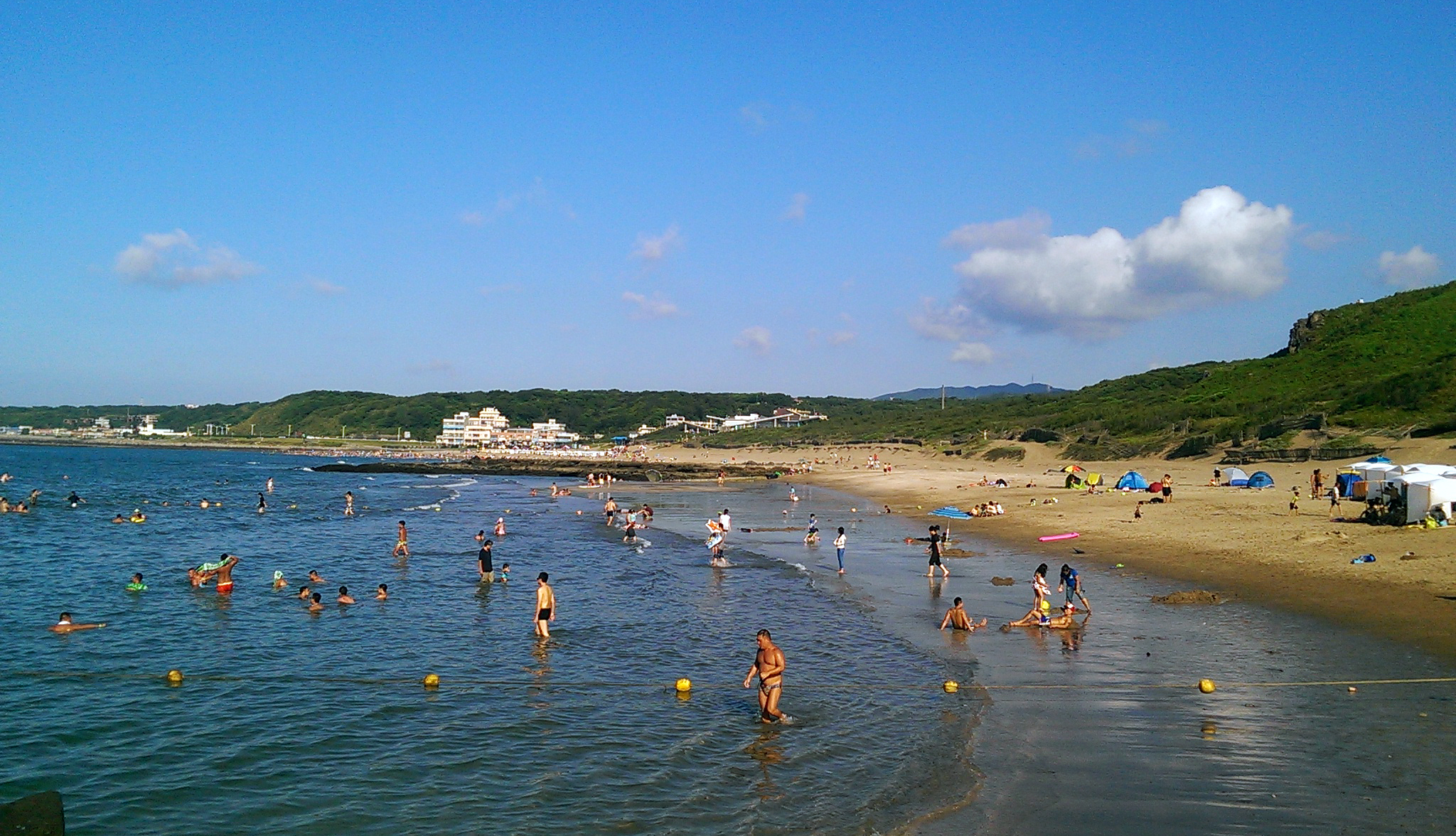

- Taiwan
- Coordinates: 25°17′03.1″N 121°30′56.9″E
- Location: Shimen, New Taipei, Taiwan

Dimensions
  - Length: 1 km
- Access: Tamsui Station

The Baisha Bay (traditional Chinese: 白沙灣海水浴場; simplified Chinese: 白沙湾海水浴场; pinyin: Báishā Wān Hǎishuǐ Yùchǎng) is a beach along the North Coast and Guanyinshan National Scenic Area in Shimen District, New Taipei, Taiwan.

== History ==
The bay area originated around 800,000 years ago where the rocky promontories were created as the result of volcanic activity from the Tatun Volcano Group that sent lava flowing directly into the sea. The beach was called Kamakura during Japanese rule for its scenic beauty that highly resembles scenery in Kamakura.

== Geography ==
The bay encompasses a half-moon shape beach for around 1 km length long. Due to its location close to the most northwestern point of Taiwan Island, the area is very windy. During the low tide, the beach area becomes very large, sometimes over 200 meters deep with shallow tide pool and many sand bars. Different minerals present in the rock around the beach have created a mottled rock surface where it has created primitive fish traps made of heaped landslide and broken coral, where fish are stranded by the retreating tide.

== Transportation ==
The beach is accessible by bus from Tamsui Station of Taipei Metro.

== See also ==
- List of tourist attractions in Taiwan
