= North Coast and Guanyinshan National Scenic Area =

Scenic area in Taiwan

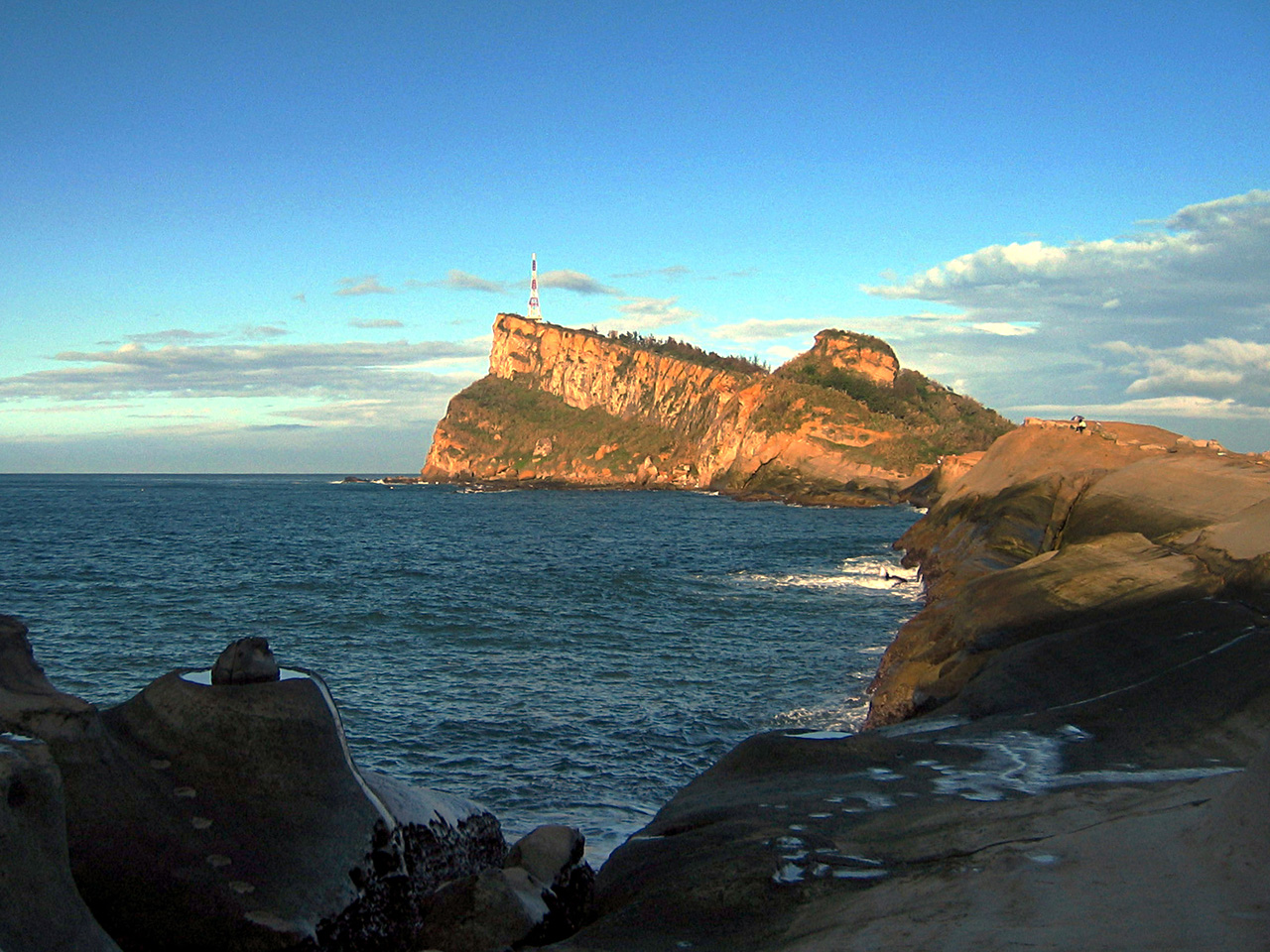
Yehliu

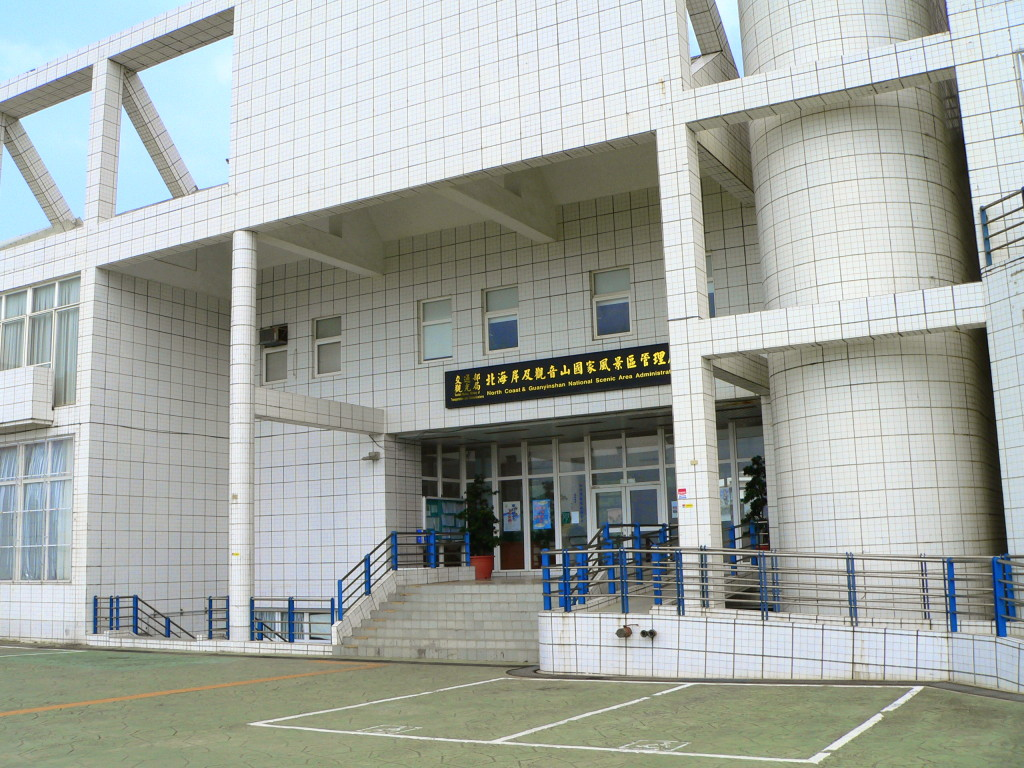
North Coast & Guanyinshan National Scenic Area Administration Center

The North Coast and Guanyinshan National Scenic Area (Chinese: 北海岸及觀音山國家風景區; pinyin: Běi Hǎi'àn Jí Guānyīnshān Guójiā Fēngjǐng Qū) (abbreviated as North Guan) is a national scenic area in Taiwan.

When the scenic area was first established on October 17, 2002, it covered a total area of 123.51 km^{2} (47.69 sq mi) and was mainly composed of the north coast of Taiwan, Yehliu and Mount Guanyin. It encompasses two separate sections of New Taipei City. The larger part consists of the seashore, part of the ocean, and a strip of land either side of Cape Fugui, the northernmost point of Taiwan. The smaller part of the Scenic Area is centred on the 616 m (2,021 ft)-high Mount Guanyin. The north coast area is between Wanli District and the boundary between Sanzhi District and Tamsui. Among them, Yehliu Scenic Area is characterized by special geology and topography.

On December 15, 2014, the Tourism Bureau of the Ministry of Communications announced that Keelung's Waimu Mountain, Lover's Lake, Heping Island and other scenic spots would be included in the North Coast and Guanyinshan National Scenic Area, and the total area was then expanded to about 130.81 km^{2} (50.51 sq mi).

The important scenic spots in the North Coast and Guanyin Mountain National Scenic Area include Fuji Fishing Port, Cape Fugui, Shimen Cave, Yeliu Tofu Rock, Jinshan Old Street, etc.

== See also ==
- List of tourist attractions in Taiwan
