= Tōbu-Izumi Station =

Railway station in Ashikaga, Tochigi Prefecture, Japan

TI14 Tōbu-Izumi Station 東武和泉駅
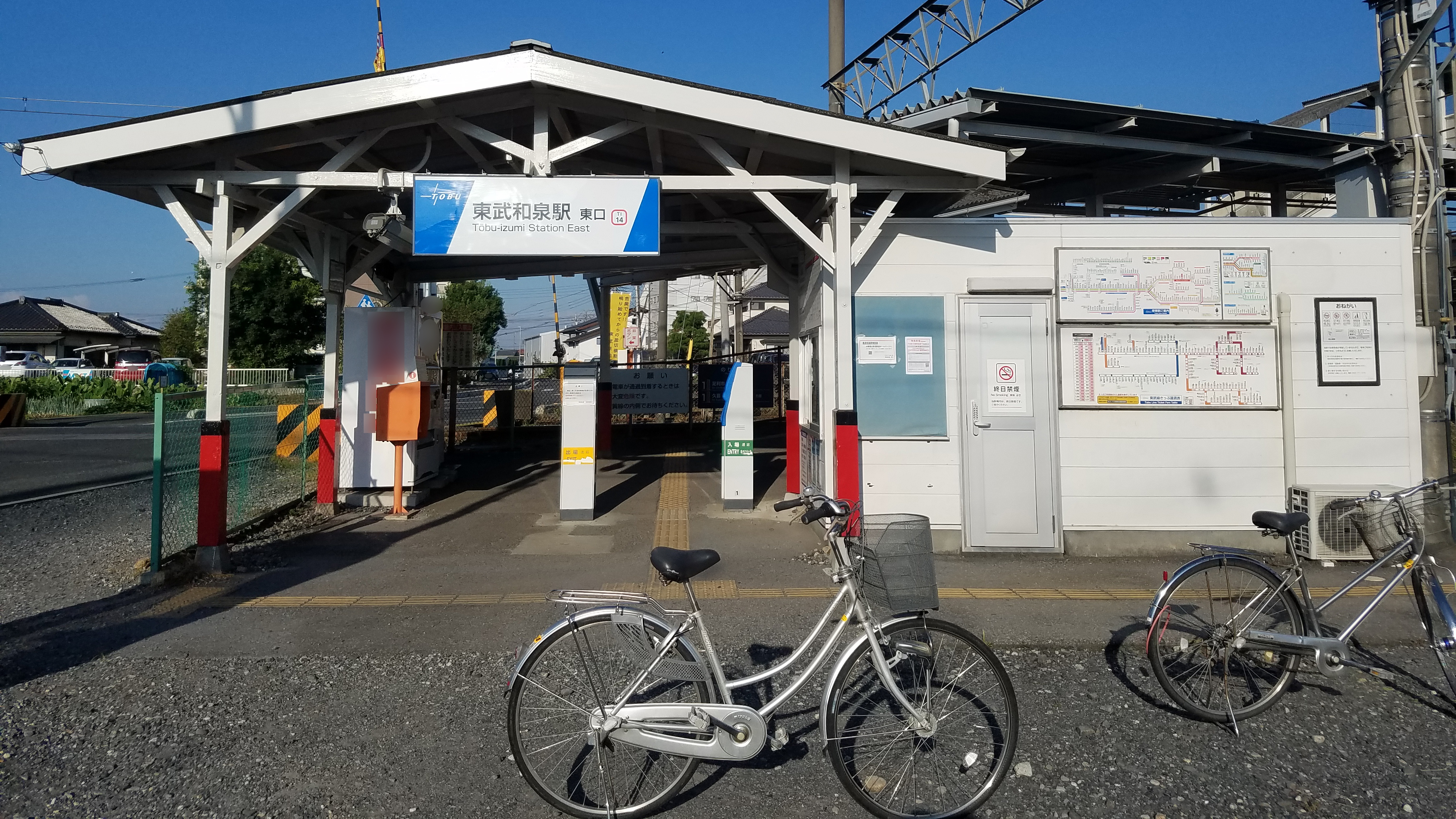
- Tōbu-Izumi Station, September 2021

General information
- Location: Fukui-cho, Ashikaga-shi, Tochigi-ken 326-0338; Japan
- Coordinates: 36°18′54″N 139°27′19″E
- Operator: Tōbu Railway
- Line: Tōbu Isesaki Line
- Platforms: 1 side platform

Other information
- Station code: TI-14
- Website: Official website

History
- Opened: 27 September 1935

Passengers
- FY2020: 969 daily

Services
Preceding station	Tobu Railway	Following station
Fukui TI13 towards Tōbu-Dōbutsu-Kōen	Isesaki Line Local	Ashikagashi TI15 towards Isesaki
Location
- Location within Tochigi Prefecture Location within Japan

Tōbu-Izumi Station (東武和泉駅, Tōbu-Izumi-eki) is a railway station in the city of Ashikaga, Tochigi, Japan, operated by the private railway operator Tōbu Railway.

== Lines ==
Tōbu-Izumi Station is served by the Tōbu Isesaki Line, and is located 85.1 km from the line's Tokyo terminus at Asakusa.

== Station layout ==
The station has a single side platform serving traffic in both directions.

== History ==
Tōbu-Izumi Station opened on 27 September 1935.

From 17 March 2012, station numbering was introduced on all Tōbu lines, with Tōbu-Izumi Station becoming "TI-14".

== Passenger statistics ==
In fiscal 2019, the station was used by an average of 969 passengers daily (boarding passengers only).

== Surrounding area ==
- Ashikaga Asakura Post Office
