= Fuguijiao Lighthouse =

Lighthouse in Shimen, New Taipei, Taiwan

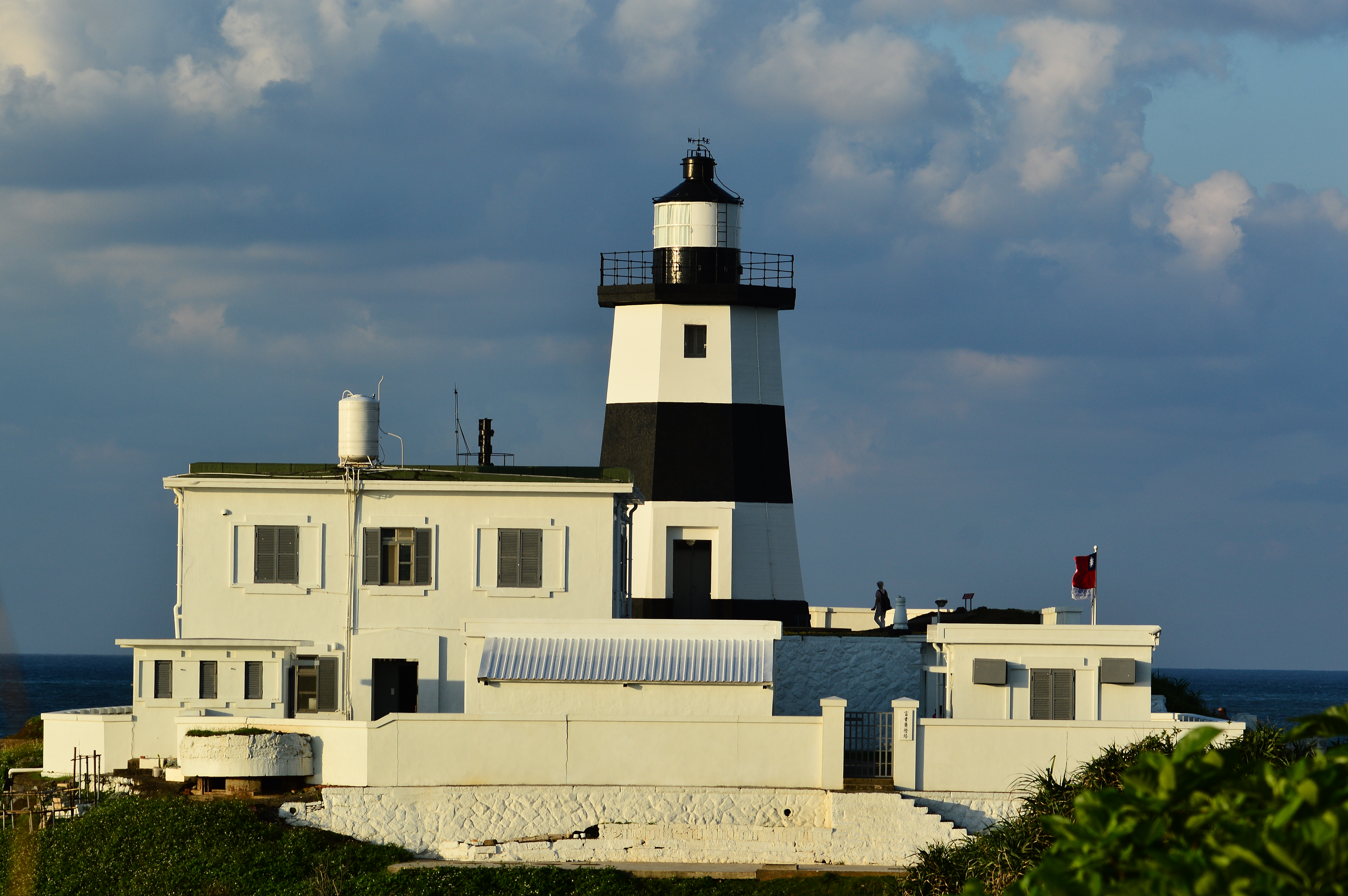
- Location: Laomei Village; Shimen District; New Taipei City; Taiwan
- Coordinates: 25.298536°N 121.536665°E

Tower
- Constructed: 1949
- Construction: reinforced concrete tower
- Height: 14.3 m (47 ft)
- Shape: octagonal tower with balcony and lantern on a one-story keeper’s house
- Markings: white and black-band tower, white lantern, black lantern dome
- Operator: Maritime and Port Bureau
- Fog signal: one 3s. blast every 30s.

Light
- First lit: 1962
- Focal height: 31.4 m (103 ft)
- Range: 26.8 nmi (49.6 km; 30.8 mi)
- Characteristic: Fl (2) W 15s.

Fuguijiao Lighthouse

Chinese name
- Traditional Chinese: 富貴角燈塔
- Simplified Chinese: 富贵角灯塔
- Postal: Fukwei Chiao Lighthouse
Transcriptions
Standard Mandarin
- Hanyu Pinyin: Fùguìjiǎo Dēngtǎ
- Wade–Giles: Fu-k’uei-chiao Têng-t’a
Southern Min
- Hokkien POJ: Hù-kùi-kak Teng-thah

Japanese name
- Kanji: 富貴角灯台
- Hiragana: ふうきかくとうだい
Transcriptions
- Romanization: Fūkikaku Tōdai

The Fuguijiao or Cape Fugui Lighthouse is a lighthouse on Cape Fugui near Laomei Village (老梅里, Lǎoméi Lǐ) in Shimen District, New Taipei City, Taiwan.

== Name ==
The lighthouse is named after nearby Cape Fugui, the northernmost point of Taiwan. Its Japanese name was Fūki Kaku. Its Chinese name (derived from a Hokkien transcription of the Dutch word hoek, meaning "hook" or "cape") is also romanized Cape Fukwei for the Chinese Postal Map, Fu-kuei Chiao using simplified Wade-Giles, and Fugueijiao from Tongyong Pinyin. It was also sometimes known in English as the Hoek Lighthouse.

== History ==
A structure was first erected on the rocks at Cape Fugui in 1896 or 1897 by the occupying Japanese. It was a terminus for undersea cables from the Japanese islands and its construction materials all came from there. It was ruined during World War II but its remains were used by China's Nationalist government for the erection of a 30 m (98 ft) octagonal iron lighthouse in 1949. The foghorn was particularly needful, owing to poor visibility in the area during the fall and winter months.

The lighthouse's current 14.3 m (47 ft) concrete black-and-white octagonal tower was raised in 1962. The height was greatly reduced to improve the reception of the nearby air force radar station.

Taiwan's Customs traditionally welcomed visitors to the lighthouse once a year on Tax Day as an open house gesture. After the enthusiastic public response to opening Eluanbi Lighthouse to more general tourism, Taiwan's Maritime and Port Bureau decided to open Fuguijiao to regular visitors in 2015. The first tourists were allowed onto the grounds on September 5, making it the 11th Taiwanese lighthouse opened to the general public. It remains inaccessible on weekdays because of the radar station. The tower itself remains closed to the public.

== Transportation ==
The lighthouse is located about 2 km (1.2 mi) north of Laomei Village, off Provincial Highway 2.

== See also ==
- List of Taiwanese superlatives
- List of tourist attractions in Taiwan
- List of lighthouses in Taiwan
