= Agata Station =

Railway station in Ashikaga, Tochigi Prefecture, Japan

TI12 Agata Station 県駅
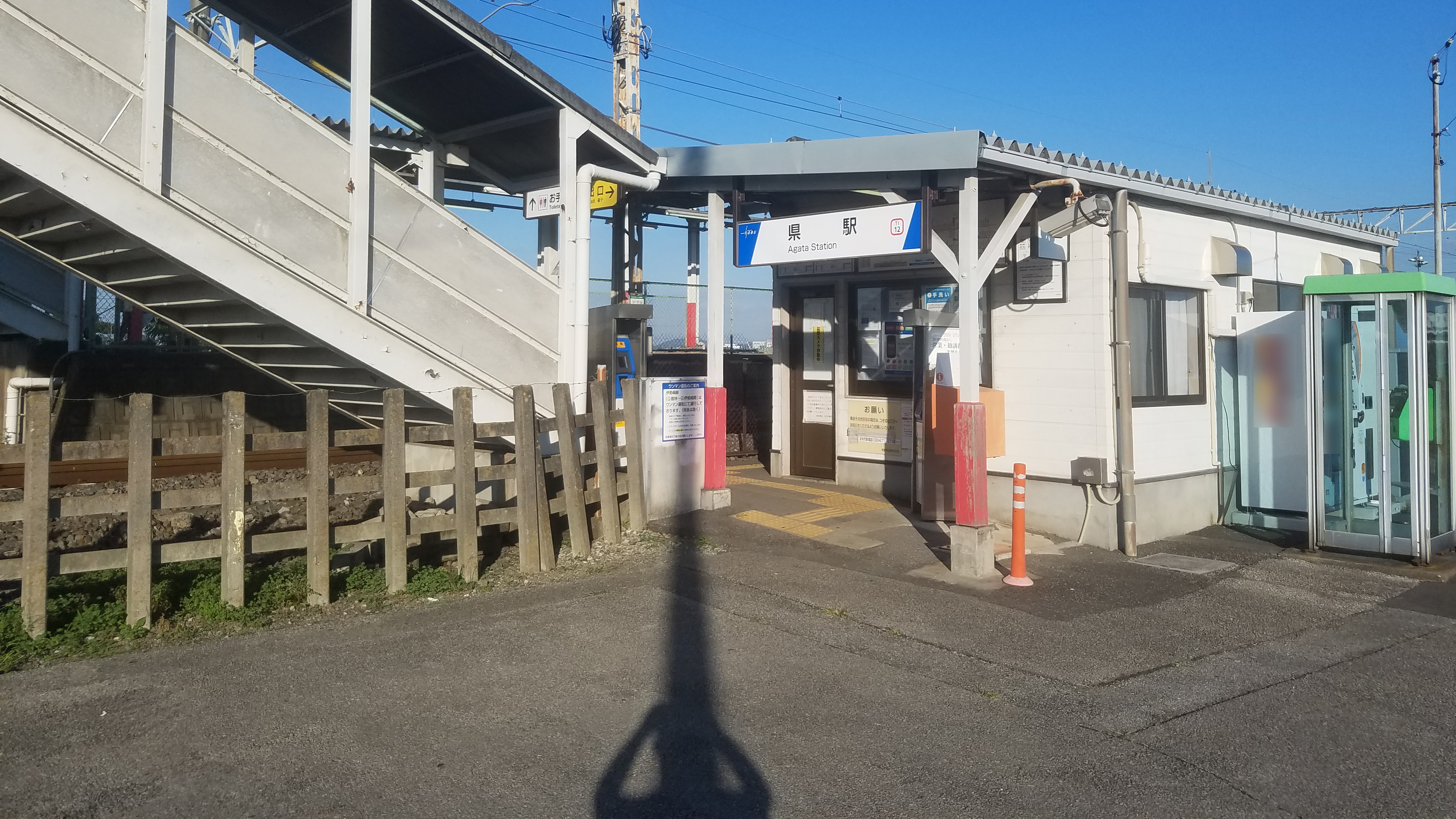
- The entrance to the Station in September 2021

General information
- Location: Agata-cho, Ashikaga-shi, Tochigi-ken 326-0328; Japan
- Coordinates: 36.2904°N 139.4725°E
- Operator: Tōbu Railway
- Line: Tōbu Isesaki Line
- Platforms: 1 island platform

Other information
- Station code: TI-12
- Website: Official website

History
- Opened: 1 May 1928

Passengers
- FY2019: 617 daily

Services
Preceding station	Tobu Railway	Following station
Tatara TI11 towards Tōbu-Dōbutsu-Kōen	Isesaki Line Local	Fukui TI13 towards Isesaki
Location
- Location within Tochigi Prefecture Location within Japan

Agata Station (県駅, Agata-eki) is a railway station in the city of Ashikaga, Tochigi, Japan, operated by the private railway operator Tōbu Railway.

== Lines ==
Agata Station is served by the Tōbu Isesaki Line, and is located 81.8 km from the line's Tokyo terminus at Asakusa.

== Station layout ==
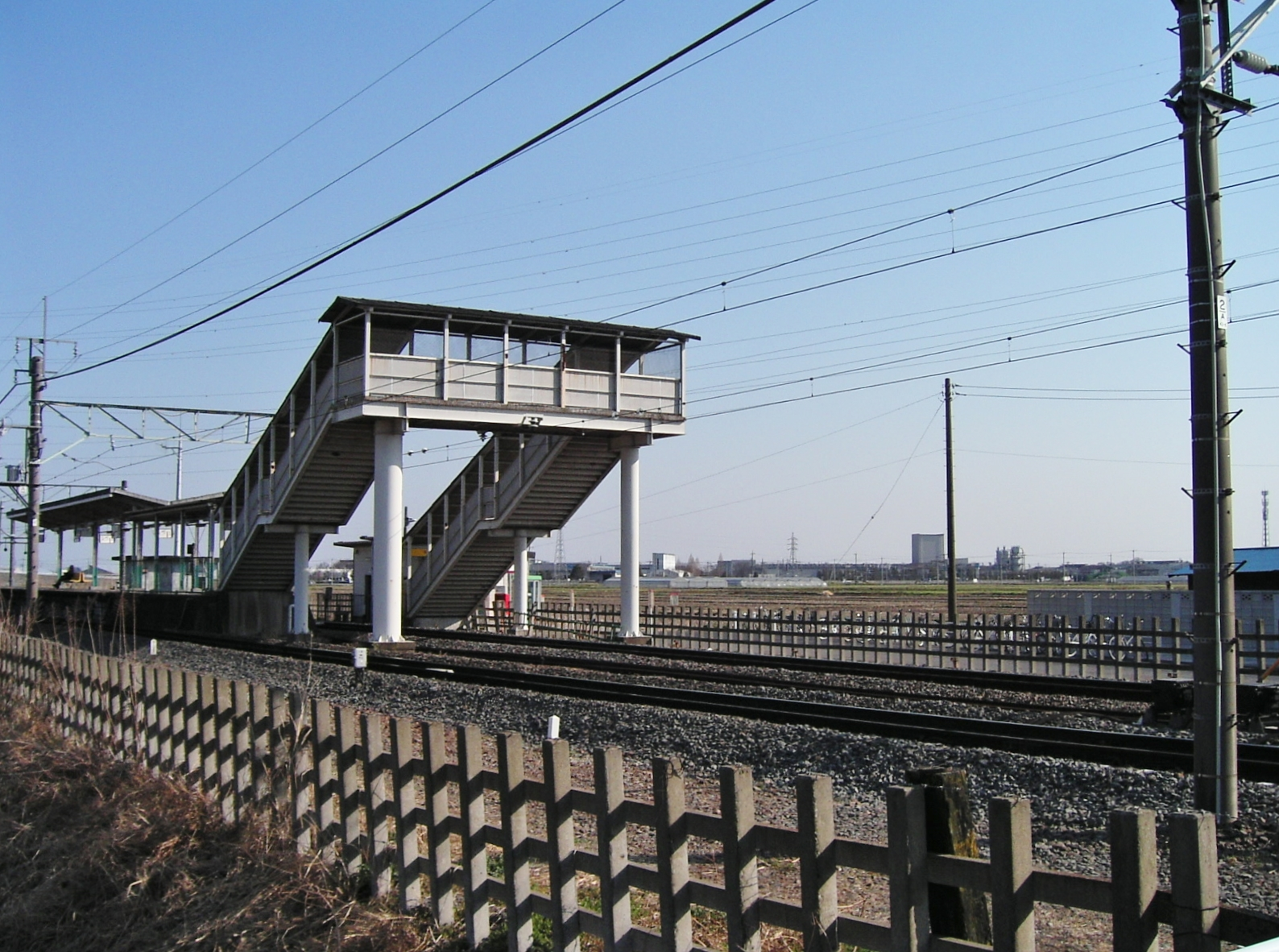
The station viewed from the north side, March 2007

This station has a single island platform, connected to the station building by a footbridge.

=== Platforms ===
1	■ Tōbu Isesaki Line	for Ashikagashi and Ōta
2	■ Tōbu Isesaki Line	for Tatebayashi, Kuki, Kita-Senju, and Asakusa

== History ==
Agata Station opened on 1 May 1928.

From 17 March 2012, station numbering was introduced on all Tobu lines, with Agata Station becoming "TI-12".

== Passenger statistics ==
In fiscal 2019, the station was used by an average of 617 passengers daily (boarding passengers only).

== Surrounding area ==
- Ashikaga Minami High School
- Ashikaga-Tsukuba Post Office
- National Route 50

== See also ==
- List of railway stations in Japan
