= Fukui Station =

Fukui Station is the name of multiple train stations in Japan.

- Fukui Station (Fukui) - (福井駅) in Fukui Prefecture
- Fukui Station (Okayama) - (福井駅) in Okayama Prefecture
- Fukui Station (Tochigi) - (福居駅) in Tochigi Prefecture
