= Taiwan Strait =

Strait between Mainland China and Taiwan

- Location within Taiwan Location within Fujian Location within Asia

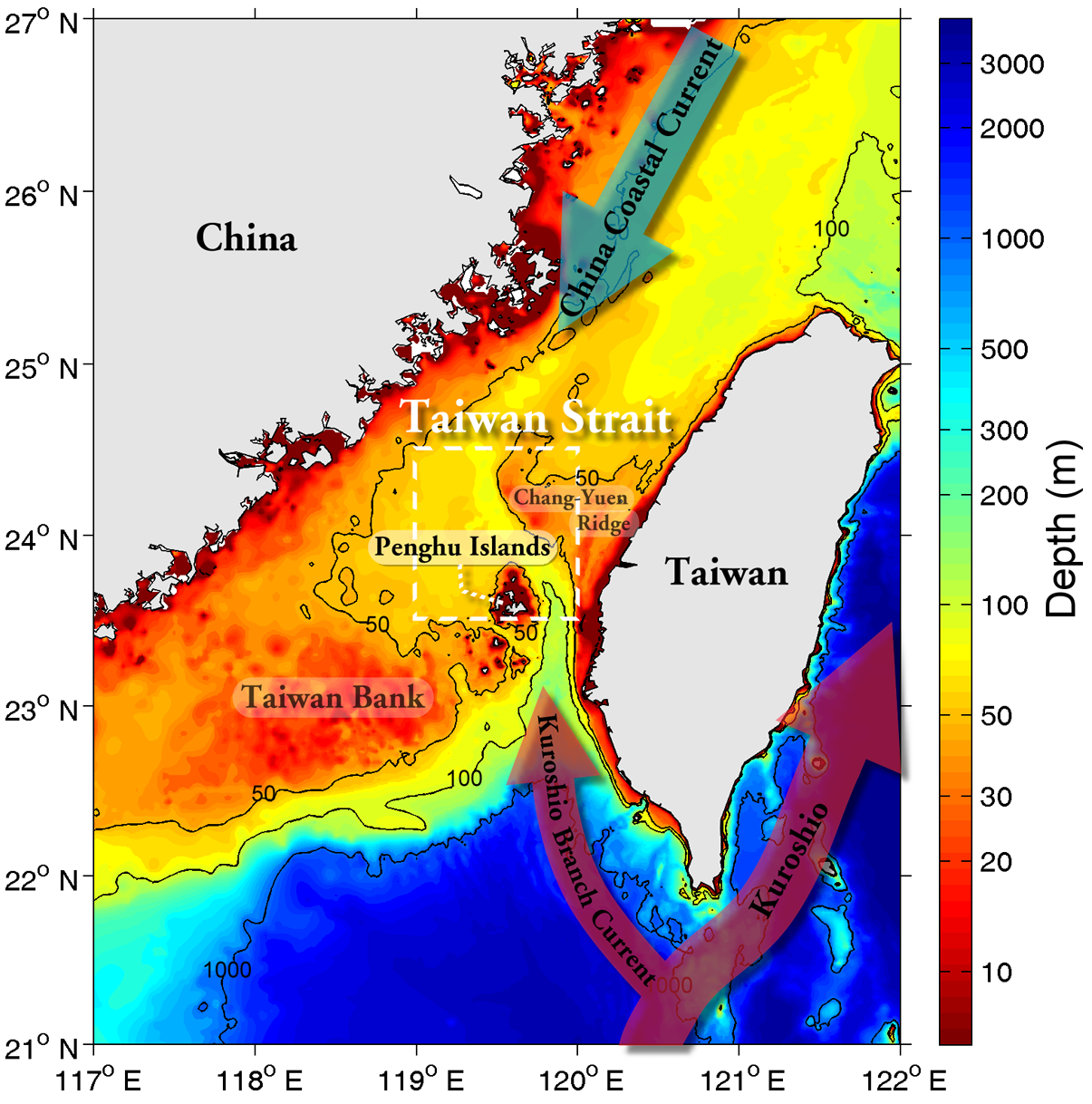
- Bathymetry of the Taiwan Strait Area
- Location: South China Sea, East China Sea (Pacific Ocean)
- Coordinates: 24°48′40″N 119°55′42″E
- Basin countries: China; Taiwan
- Max. length: 370 km (230 mi)
- Max. width: 410 km (250 mi)
- Min. width: 126 km (78 mi)
- Surface area: 80,000 km^{2} (31,000 sq mi)
- Average depth: 60 m (200 ft)
- Max. depth: 150 m (490 ft)

Taiwan Strait
- Traditional Chinese: 臺灣海峽
- Simplified Chinese: 台湾海峡
- Hokkien POJ: Tâi-ôan Hái-kiap
Transcriptions
Standard Mandarin
- Hanyu Pinyin: Táiwān Hǎixiá
- Wade–Giles: Tʻai-wan Hai-hsia
Wu
- Romanization: De^{平}-uae^{平} He^{上}-yah^{入}
Hakka
- Romanization: Thòi-vân Hói-hia̍p
Yue: Cantonese
- Jyutping: Toi^{4}-waan^{1} Hoi^{2}-haap^{3}
Southern Min
- Hokkien POJ: Tâi-ôan Hái-kiap
Eastern Min
- Fuzhou BUC: Dài-uăng Hāi-hàp

Taiwan Sea
- Traditional Chinese: 臺海
- Simplified Chinese: 台海
- Hokkien POJ: Tâi-hái
- Literal meaning: Taiwan Sea
Transcriptions
Standard Mandarin
- Hanyu Pinyin: Táihǎi
- Wade–Giles: Tʻai-hai
Wu
- Romanization: De^{平}-he^{上}
Hakka
- Romanization: Thòihói
Yue: Cantonese
- Jyutping: Toi^{4}-hoi^{2}
Southern Min
- Hokkien POJ: Tâi-hái
Eastern Min
- Fuzhou BUC: Dài-hāi

Black Ditch
- Traditional Chinese: 烏水溝
- Simplified Chinese: 乌水沟
- Hokkien POJ: O͘ Chúi-kau
- Literal meaning: Black Ditch
Transcriptions
Standard Mandarin
- Hanyu Pinyin: Wū Shuǐgōu
- Wade–Giles: Wu Shui-kou
Southern Min
- Hokkien POJ: O͘ Chúi-kau

The Taiwan Strait is a 180-kilometer-wide (110 mi; 97 nmi) strait separating the island of Taiwan and mainland Asia. The strait connects the South China Sea to the south, and the East China Sea to the north. The narrowest part is 126 km (78 mi; 68 nmi) wide.

== Names ==
Former names of the Taiwan Strait include the Formosa Strait or Strait of Formosa, from a dated name for Taiwan; the Strait of Fuchien, Fukien or Fokien, from the Chinese province forming the strait's western shore; and the Black Ditch, a calque of the strait's name in Hokkien and Hakka.

== Geography ==
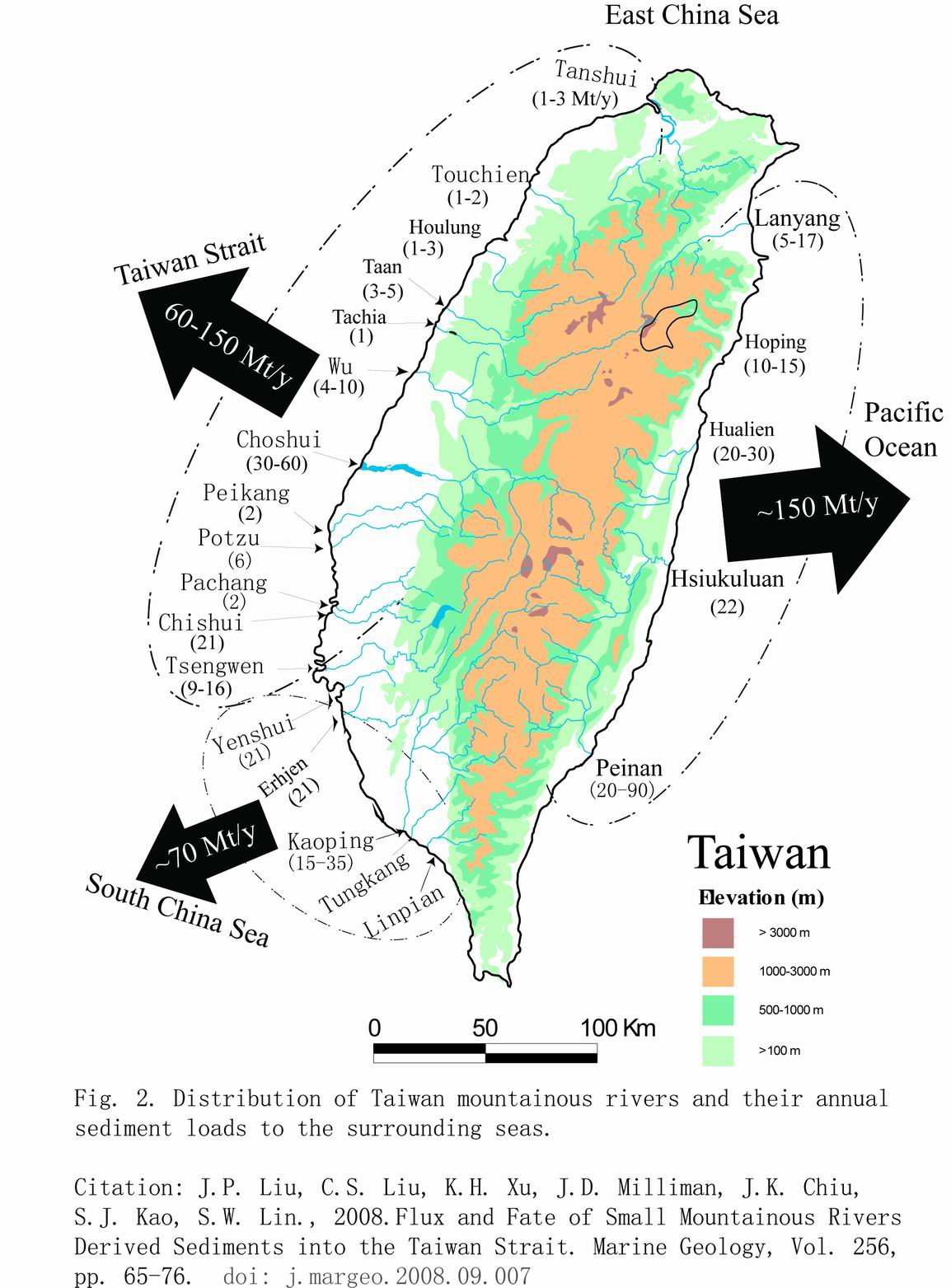
Distributions of rivers in Taiwan and their annual sediment loads

The Taiwan Strait is the body of water separating Fujian Province from Taiwan Island. The international agreement does not define the Taiwan Strait but places its waters within the South China Sea, whose northern limit runs from Cape Fugui (the northernmost point on Taiwan Island; Fukikaku) to Niushan Island to the southernmost point of Pingtan Island and thence westward along the parallel 25° 24′ N. to the coast of Fujian Province. The draft for a new edition of the IHO's Limits of Oceans and Seas does precisely define the Taiwan Strait, classifying it as part of the North Pacific Ocean. It makes the Taiwan Strait a body of water between the East and South China Seas and delimits it:

On the North: A line joining the coast of China (25° 42′ N - 119° 36′ E) eastward to Xiang Cape (25° 40′ N - 119° 47′ 10″ E), the northern extremity of Haitan Island, and thence to Fugui Cape (25° 17′ 45″ N - 121° 32′ 30″ E), the northern extremity of Taiwan Island (the common limit with the East China Sea, see 7.3).

On the East: From Fugui Cape southward, along the western coast of Taiwan Island, to Eluan Cape (21° 53′ 45″ N - 120° 51′ 30″ E), the southern extremity of this island.

On the South: A line joining Eluan Cape northwestward, along the southern banks of Nanao Island, to the southeastern extremity of this island (23° 23′ 35″ N - 117° 07′ 15″ E); thence westward, along the southern coast of Nanao Island, to Changshan Head (23° 25′ 50″ N - 116° 56′ 25″ E), the western extremity of this island; and thence a line joining Changshan Head westward to the mouth of the Hanjiang River (23° 27′ 30″ N - 116° 52′ E), on the coast of China (the common limit with the South China Sea, see 6.1).

On the West: From the mouth of Hanjiang River northeastward, along the coast of China, to position 25° 42′ N - 119° 36′ E.

The entire strait is on Asia's continental shelf. It is almost entirely less than 150 m (490 ft; 82 fathoms) deep, with a short ravine of that depth off the southwest coast of Taiwan. As such, there are many islands in the strait. The largest and most important islands off the coast of Fujian are Xiamen, Gulangyu, Pingtan (the "Haitan" of the IHO delineation), Kinmen, and Matsu. The first three are controlled by the People's Republic of China (PRC); the last two by the Republic Of China (ROC). Within the strait lie the Penghu or the Pescadores, also controlled by the ROC. There is a major underwater bank 40–60 km (25–37 mi) north of the Penghu Islands.

All of Fujian Province's rivers except the Ting run into the Taiwan Strait. The largest two are the Min and the Jiulong.

=== Median line ===
A theoretical "median line", also known as the Davis line, was defined down the middle of the strait by US Air Force General Benjamin O. Davis Jr. in 1955, after which the US pressured both sides not to cross it. As a tacit understanding, it never gained official or legal status. The PRC has never recognized the median line. Aircraft from Taiwan crossed it frequently until the Second Taiwan Strait Crisis in 1958. Between 1954 and 2019, military craft generally did not cross the area except on three occasions.

In 2019, Taiwan's defense ministry provided coordinates for the median line. The ministry recognizes the line as running from 27°N, 122°E in the north to 23°N, 118°E on the southern end.

In 2019, warplanes of the People's Liberation Army (PLA) crossed the median line for the first time since 1999. In 2020, the PRC Foreign Ministry explicitly denied the existence of a median line and no longer act as if such a line exists. Furthermore, Chinese military exercises around Taiwan since 2022 has completely erased the concept of a supposed median line.

== Geology ==
=== Sediment distribution ===
Each year, Taiwan's rivers carry up to 370 million tons of sediments into the sea, including 60 to 150 million tons deposited into the Taiwan Strait. During the past ten thousand years, 600 billion tons of riverine sediments have been deposited in the Taiwan Strait, locally forming a lobe up to 40 m thick in the southern part of the Taiwan Strait.

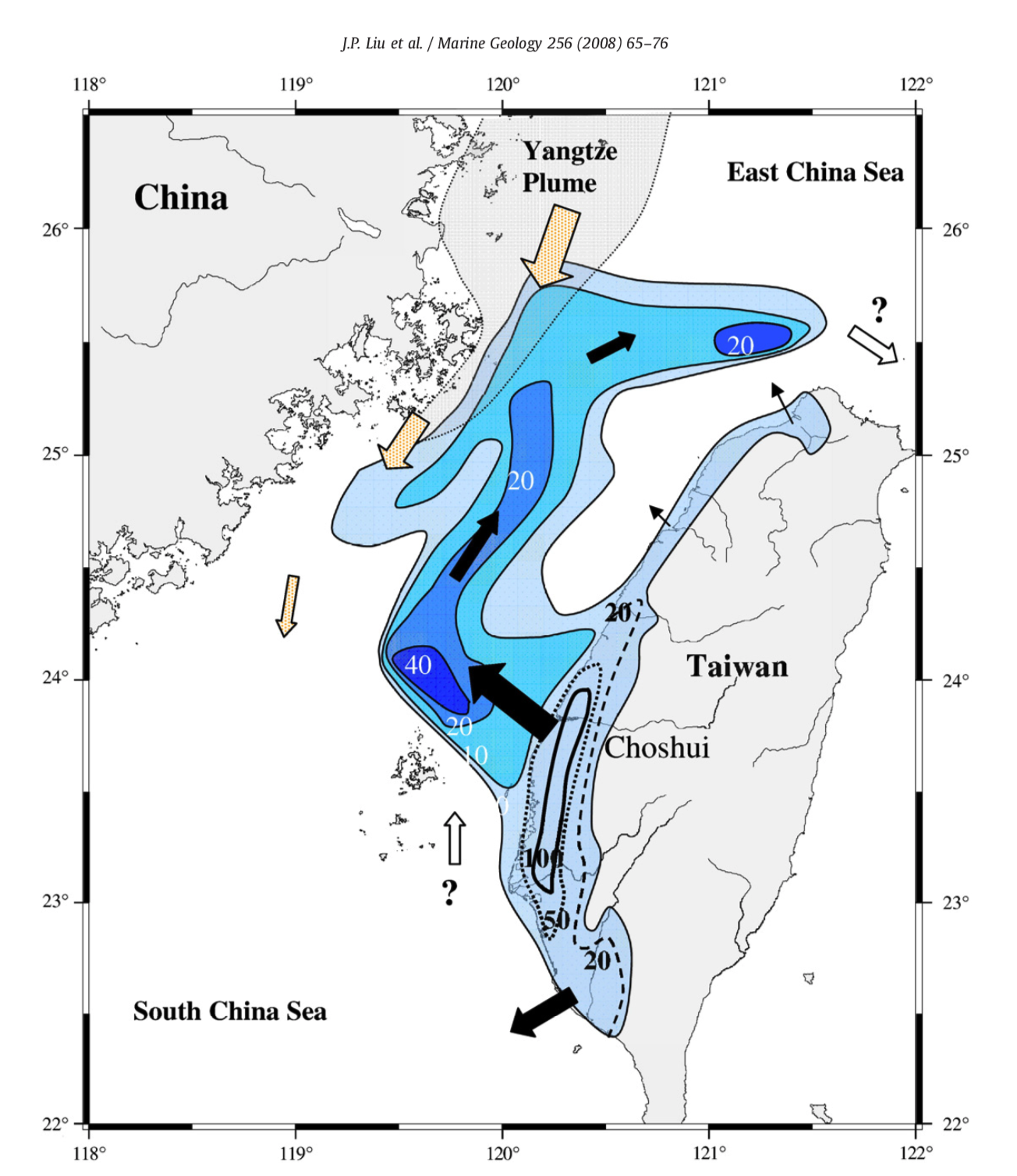
Holocence sediment depth in the Taiwan strait, in meters

== History ==
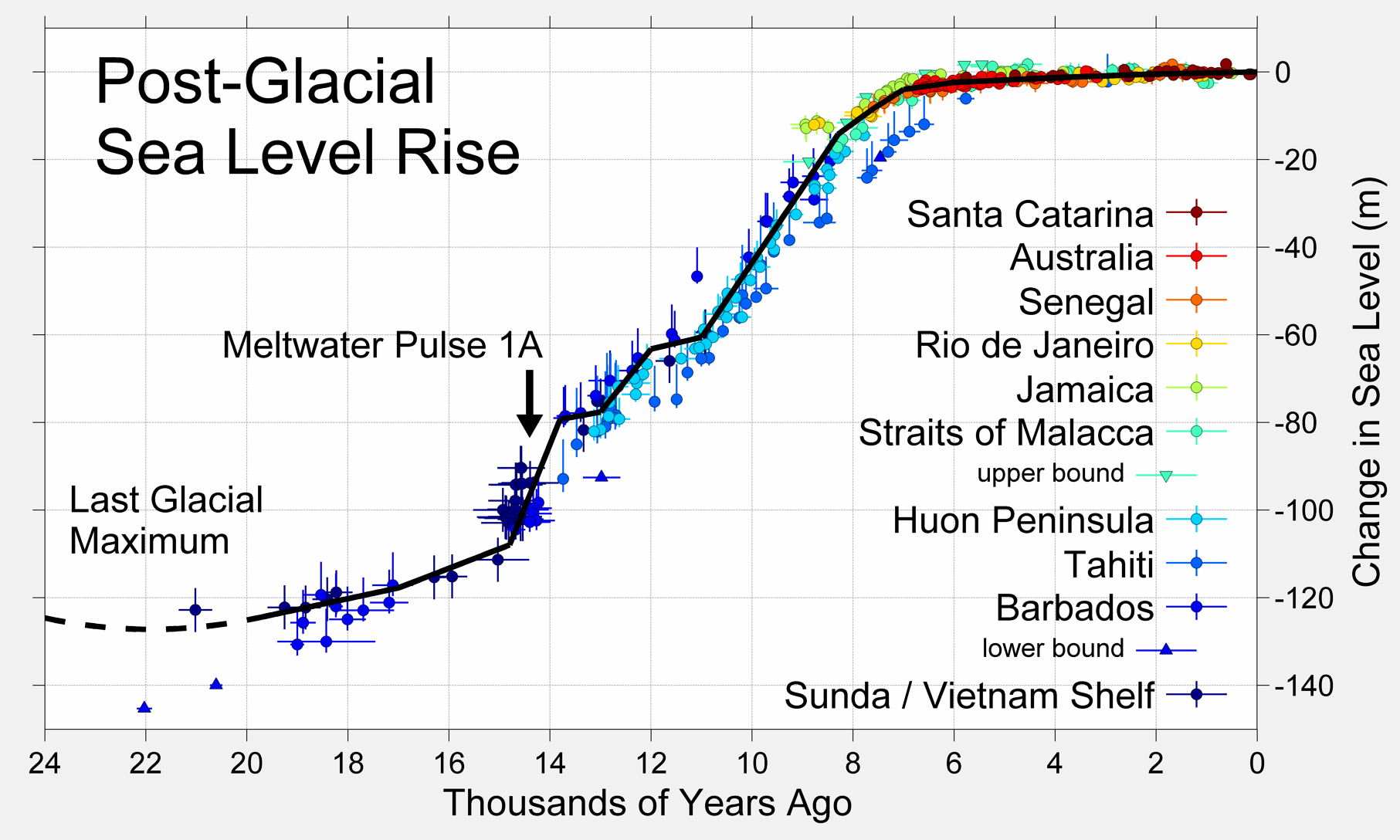
The Taiwan strait appeared at the start of the current warmer period.

The Strait mostly separated the Han culture of mainland China from Taiwan Island's aborigines for millennia, although the Hakka and Hoklo traded and migrated across it. European explorers, principally the Portuguese, Spanish and Dutch, also took advantage of the strait to establish forward bases for trade with the mainland during the Ming; the bases were also used for raiding both the Chinese coast and the trading ships of rival countries.

Widespread Chinese migration across the strait began in the late Ming. During the Qing conquest, Zheng Chenggong (Koxinga) expelled the Dutch and established the Kingdom of Tungning in 1661, planning to launch a reconquest of the mainland in the name of the Southern Ming branches of the old imperial dynasty. Dorgon and the Kangxi Emperor were able to consolidate their control over southern mainland China; Koxinga found himself limited to raiding across the strait. His grandson Zheng Keshuang surrendered to the Qing after his admiral lost the 1683 Battle of the Penghu Islands in the middle of the strait.

Japan seized the Penghu Islands during the First Sino-Japanese War and gained control of Taiwan at its conclusion in 1895. Control of the eastern half of the strait was used to establish control of the southern Chinese coast during the Second World War. The strait protected Japanese bases and industry in Taiwan from Chinese attack and sabotage, but aerial warfare reached the island by 1943. The 1944 Formosa Air Battle gave the United States Pacific Fleet air supremacy from its carrier groups and Philippine bases; subsequently, the bombing was continuous until Japan's surrender in 1945. The rapid advance of the Communist PLA in 1949 provoked the government's retreat across the Taiwan Strait.

In the aftermath of the Chinese Civil War, People's Republic of China and Republic of China had multiple brief armed conflicts on the Taiwan Strait, consequently named the First Taiwan Strait Crisis, the Second Taiwan Strait Crisis, and the Third Taiwan Strait Crisis. These confrontations did not result in large-scale military conflicts between China and Taiwan. In the 21st century, the Cross-Strait relations stabilized, leading to the establishment of Three Links on 15 December 2008, with the commencement of direct commercial flights, shipping, and post across the Taiwan Strait.

On 25 May 2002, China Airlines Flight 611 broke up in mid-air and crashed into the Taiwan Strait, killing all 225 people on board. On 26 February 2022, China denounced the sailing of the U.S. Navy's 7th Fleet Arleigh Burke-class guided-missile destroyer USS Ralph Johnson through the Taiwan Strait as a "provocative act".

Since 2018 China has denied that the concept of international waters applies to the Taiwan Strait. China does not claim sovereignty over the entire strait but seeks to regulate what it views as "support for the Taiwan authorities and muscle-flexing against the mainland". This position has led to concerns from American, Australian, and French officials and objection from Taiwan. "International waters" is technically not defined by the United Nations Convention on the Law of the Sea, and there is no high seas corridor within the Taiwan Strait, but transit rights mimicking high seas such as innocent passage and freedom of navigation are generally allowed within exclusive economic zones. The Taiwan Strait has traditionally provided Taiwan with a degree of strategic depth vis-a-vis mainland China.

== Economy ==
Fishermen have used the strait as a fishing resource since ancient times. In the modern world, it is the gateway used by ships of almost every kind on passage to and from nearly all the important ports in Northeast Asia. Chinese vessels often trespass into Taiwanese territorial waters to fish or dredge sand, leading to interceptions by the Coast Guard Administration as well as seizures, confiscations, and fines.

Taiwan is building major wind farms in the strait.

== Gallery ==
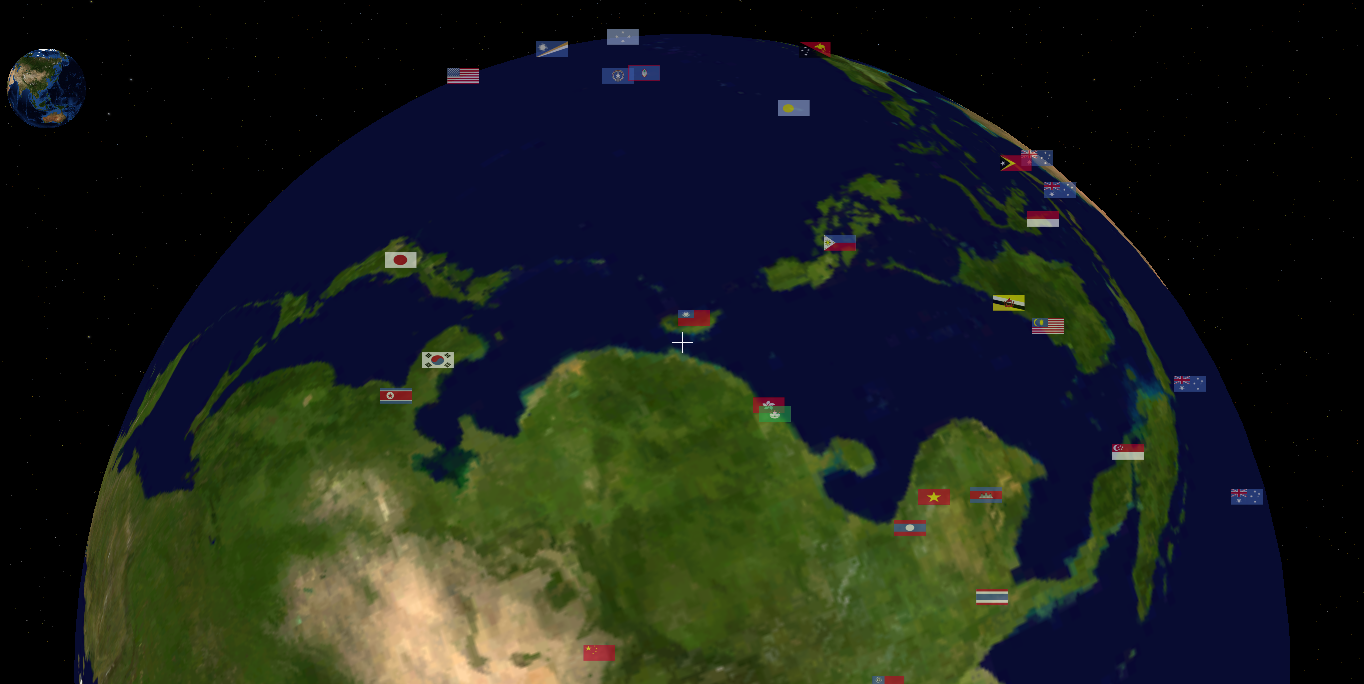
Looking east from Asia to the Pacific

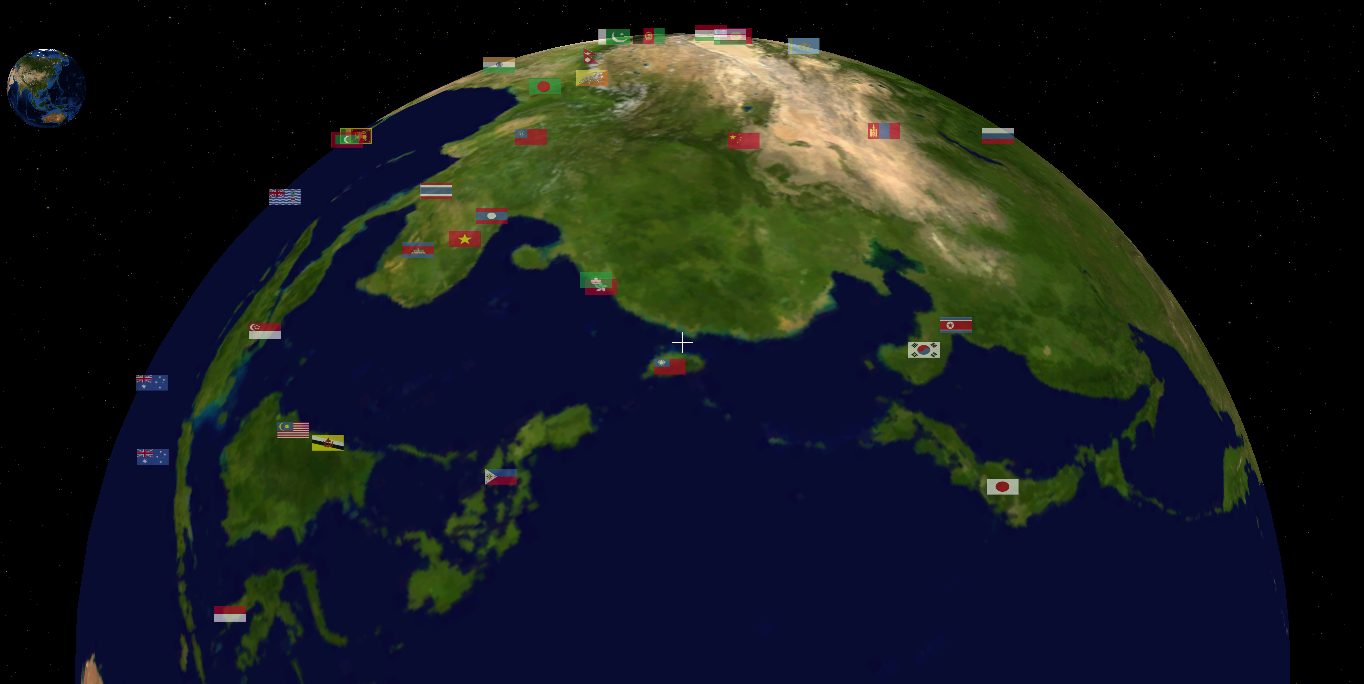
Looking west from the Pacific to Asia

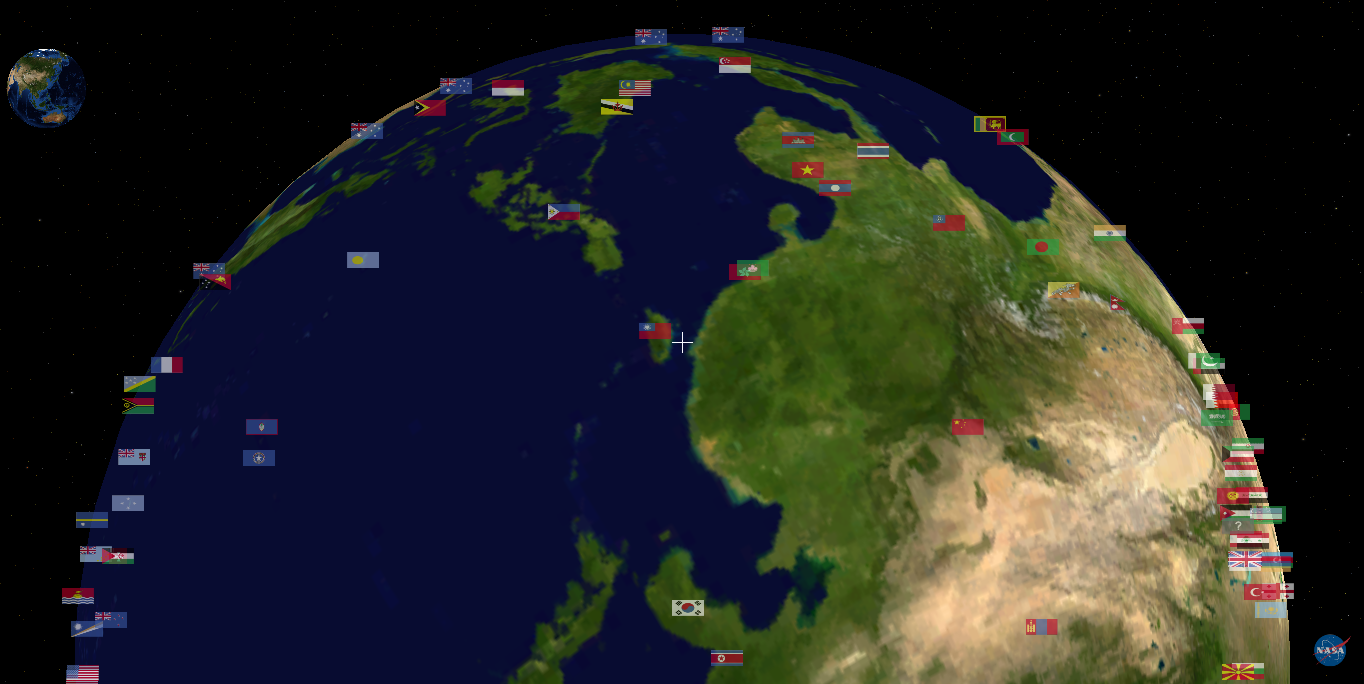
Looking south from the East to South China Sea

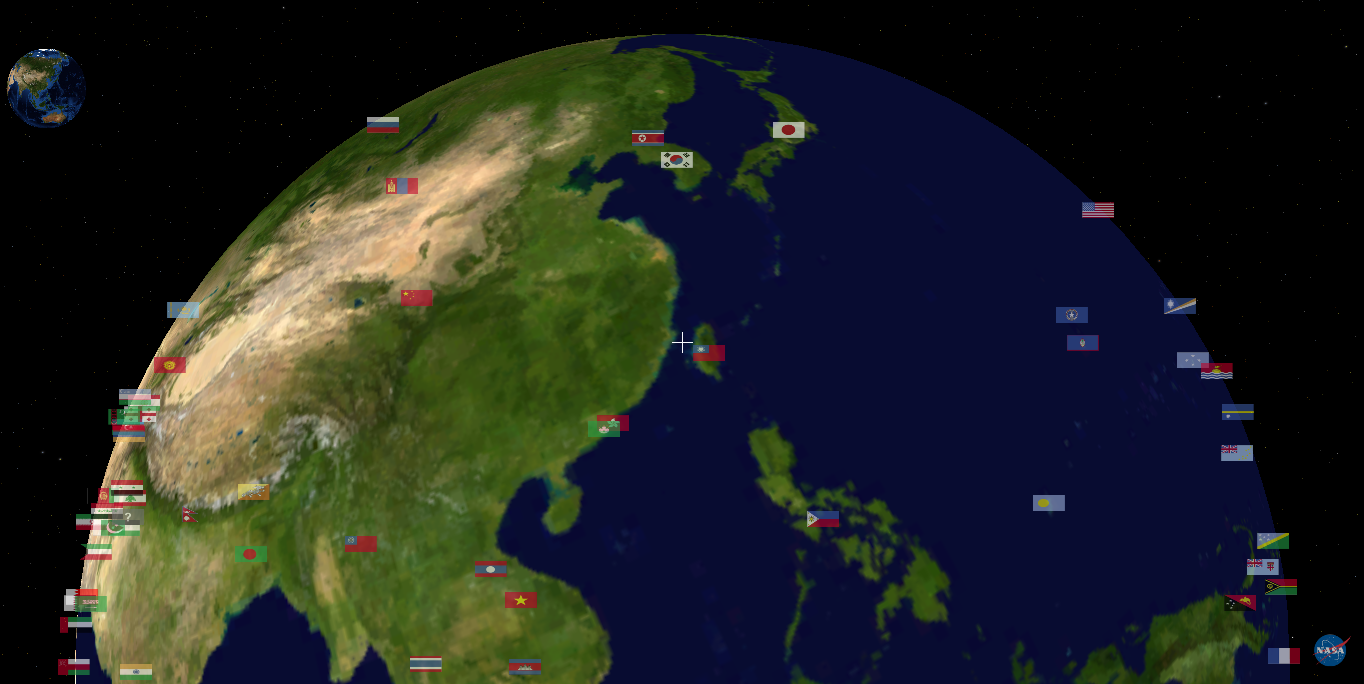
Looking north from the South to East China Sea

== See also ==
- China Airlines Flight 611
- Cross-Strait relations
- List of Pacific typhoon seasons
- Luzon Strait
- Panama Canal
- Suez Canal
- Taijiang National Park
- Western Taiwan Straits Economic Zone
