= Fukui (surname) =

Fukui (Japanese: 福井) is a Japanese name meaning "fortunate" or sometimes "one who is from the Fukui prefecture". Notable people with the surname include:

- Kenichi Fukui (福井 謙一; 1918–1998), physical chemist who was awarded the Nobel Prize in Chemistry in 1981
- Kenichiro Fukui (福井 健一郎; born 1970), Japanese video game music composer, arranger and performer
- Kenji Fukui (福井 謙二; born 1953), Japanese television announcer, best known as the head commentator of television program Iron Chef, referred as "Fukui-san" in the program
- Koki Fukui (福井 光輝; born 1995), Japanese footballer
- Masato Fukui (福井 理人; born 1988), Japanese footballer
- Mieko Fukui (福井 美恵子; 1956–1980), Japanese women's basketball player
- Mina Fukui (福井 未菜; born 1984), Japanese actress and television personality
- Morita Fukui (福井 盛太; 1885–1965), former commissioner of Nippon Professional Baseball
- Ryo Fukui (福居 良; 1948-2016), Japanese jazz pianist
- Shozin Fukui (福居 ショウジン; 1961–2026), Japanese movie director and screenwriter
- Taichi Fukui (福井 太智; born 2004), Japanese footballer
- Takeo Fukui (福井 威夫; born 1944), Japanese businessman, President and CEO of Honda
- Teru Fukui (福井 照; born 1953), Japanese politician, a member of the House of Representatives of Japan

== See also ==
- Fukui (disambiguation)
