= Fuji Fishing Port =

Port in Shimen, New Taipei, Taiwan

Fuji Harbour 富基漁港
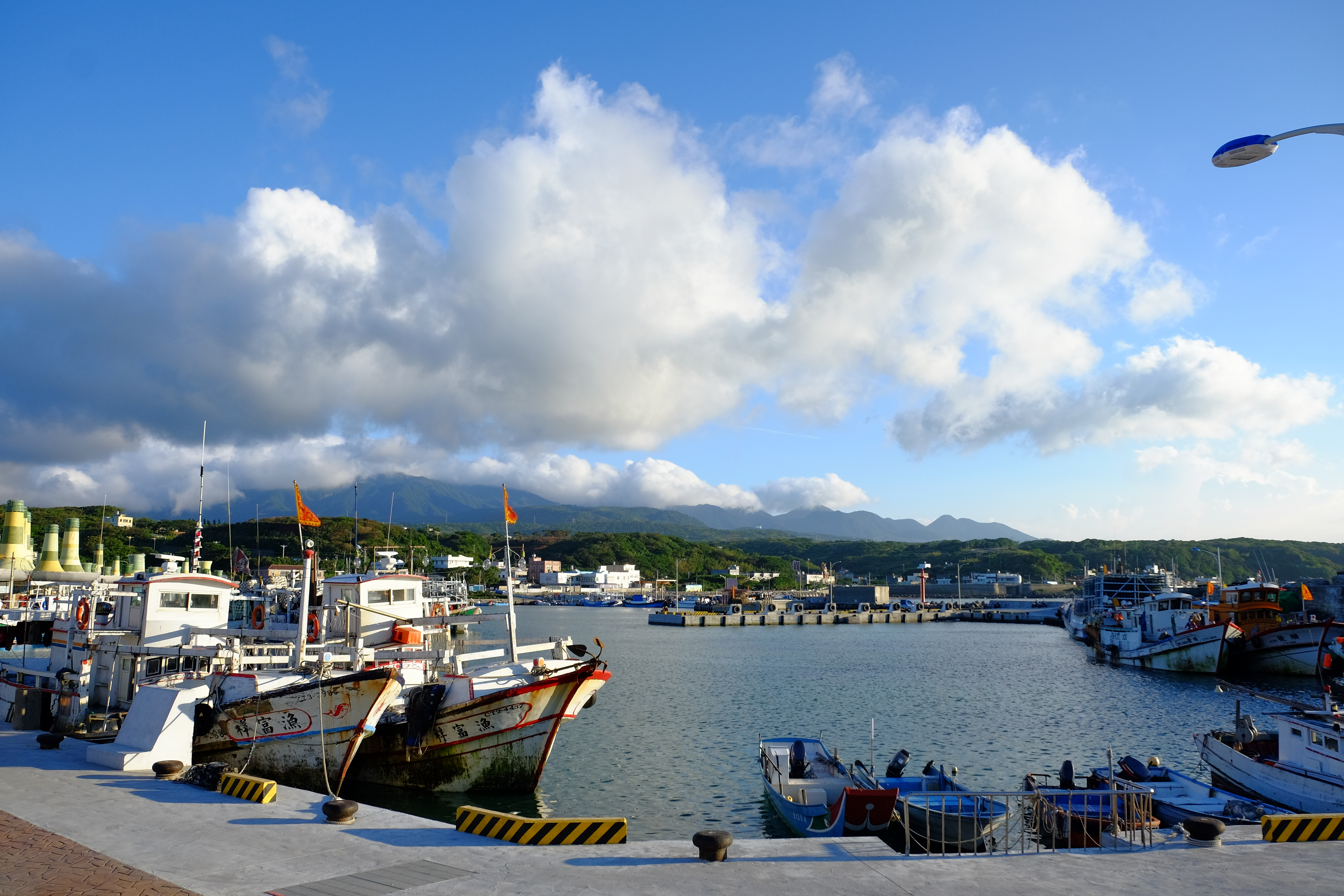
- Interactive map of Fuji Harbour 富基漁港
- Location within Taiwan

Location
- Location: Shimen District, New Taipei, Taiwan
- Coordinates: 25°17′30″N 121°32′1″E

Details
- Type of Harbor: fishing port

The Fuji Harbour (traditional Chinese: 富基漁港; simplified Chinese: 富基渔港; pinyin: Fùjī Yúgǎng) is a fishing port in Shimen District, New Taipei, Taiwan.

== History ==
The port used to be a small unknown fishing port in the region. In 1995, the Fuji Fish Outlet Center was established by Jinshan Fishermen's Association within the area.

After the local government established the Fuji Seafood Market, the port became well known to the public.

== Architecture ==
The port have 3.5-meter deep wharf and 1.9 hectares berth and 3.0-meter deep wharf and 0.95 hectares berth. The port also features a fish market.

== Transportation ==
The port is accessible by bus from Tamsui Station of Taipei Metro.
