= Beigu Islet =

Islet in Dongyin, Matsu Islands, Taiwan

Coordinates: 26.399444°N 120.476111°E

Beigu Islet (Chinese: 北固礁) is the northernmost point of territory currently under the actual control of the Republic of China (Taiwan). It is a rocky outcrop governed by Dongyin Township, Lienchiang County, Fujian Province, Republic of China (Taiwan).

It was once a fishing ground for Dongyin fishermen and served as one of their fishing areas. After the Xinhai Revolution, it has remained under the continuous jurisdiction of the Republic of China.

== Northern border of the nation ==
Beigu Islet is the northernmost point of territory under the actual control of the Republic of China (Taiwan). Due to the small size of the reef and the inability to reach it directly, a stone monument inscribed with "Northern Border of the Nation" and an observation platform have been established at the northern end of Xiyin Island, from where Beigu Reef can be viewed from a distance.
