= Magic Boy Kitchener =

- Genre: Inspirational Cartoon
- Written by: Lini Tian
- Directed by: Long Xu/Renfeng Zhou
- Voices of: Wenjun Yuan/Ting Yan/Juan Liu/Jie Liu/Huaiwu Zhang
- Country of origin: China
- Original language: Mandarin
- No. of episodes: 132

Production
- Producer: Hong Wang/Mengfan He
- Animator: Hunan Hongmeng Animation Communication limited Company
- Production company: Hunan Hongmeng Animation Communication limited Company

Original release
- Network: iQIYI
- Release: 1 August 2007

Magic Boy Kitchener (Chinese: 神厨小福贵; pinyin: Shén Chú Xiǎo Fú Guì) is a Chinese animated series, made of 132 consecutive episodes, currently broadcast on CCTV.

== Brief Introduction ==
| Episodes | Genre | Premiere time | Directors | Writer |
|---|---|---|---|---|
| 132 | Inspirational Animation | November 2, 2007 | Long Xu, Renfeng Zhou | Lini, Tian |

== Synopsis ==
The series takes place in the late Qing dynasty, during the era of the Empress Dowager Cixi. The protagonist, Fugui learns the cooking skills from his grandfather when he is growing up, and he respects his grandfather very much. After a convoy accident in which the imperial kitchener perishes, Cixi searches for a new kitchener from the country. She sends her eunuchs to a nearby town, where they find a small tavern with a skilled elderly chef - the grandfather of Fugui. His grandfather is taken away by the eunuchs and is involved in a plot, leaving only one option for Fugui - becoming the imperial kitchener, thereby saving the life of his grandfather.

To return grandpa an innocent reputation and reunite with him, Fugui starts his journey. He needs to obtain 18 gold kitchen utensils to beat all the others cooks who also tries to become the Dowager's new cook. Fugui naturally attracts the attention of the villain K, and Fugui also becomes the opponent that K wants to eliminate. In the way of adventure, Fugui gets acquainted with Feidie who wants to assassinate Empress Dowager Cixi to avenge for parents. They help each other and become good friends. Fugui also makes many other friends such as Guangxu Emperor, Xiao Lizi, and old imperial physician. In the end, K successfully accomplishes his conspiracy, and he kills both Fugui's grandfather and the old imperial physician; Feidie also leaves the imperial palace because she is forced to marry K's son. Finally, Fugui is extremely disappointed and rides away from these political conflicts.

== Main Voice Actors ==
| Played by | Roles |
|---|---|
| Ting Yan | Fugui (小福贵) |
| Na Wang | Mifeng (小蜜蜂) |
| Wenjun Yuan | Empress Dowager Cixi (老佛爷) |
| Hua Jiang | K (K大人) |
| Yilin Fu | Feidie (小飞蝶) |

== Characters Information ==
| Name | Key Storyline |
|---|---|
| Fugui Hong (小福贵) | A boy lived in a small town, the grandson of Chef Hong. He is clever, mischievous, and very filial to his grandpa. He learned to cook from his grandfather since young. He can detect the taste of food with his left index finger, which turns golden yellow when it tastes best. In order to get the golden kitchen utensils given by the royal to rescue the arrested grandfather, he becomes the target of villain K. He is bold and dares to fight; Rely on their laborious efforts, and with the help of Feidie, Fugui finally becomes a royal chef. However, as the people he loves all left, he also chooses to leave the palace. |
| Guangxu Emperor (光绪帝) | The 11th emperor of the Qing dynasty, he was stripped of real power by Cixi. Open-minded and kind-hearted, he tries to revitalize the country through political reform, but is obstructed and suppressed by Cixi, and secretly persecuted by officials. After the reform failed, Guangxu lives a prison life. He is very depressed and melancholy. He gives Fugui a lot of help. Fugui called him "bean sprout". |
| Feidie (小飞蝶) | A mysterious girl, she wants to kill the Empress Dowager Cixi to revenge for her parents. She fails for many times but never gives up. She always offers a lot of help to Fugui. After being informed that she is the daughter of the YuHui Empress, she still tries her best to support Fugui. Finally, in order not to marry the son of villain K, she escapes from the court. |
| Empress Dowager Cixi (慈禧太后) | Empress dowager of the late Qing dynasty, known as the "Old Buddha". She is powerful, politically inflexible, old-fashioned, cunning, and ruthless. In life, she loves delicious food and some fashionable things. She sometimes unconsciously delivers her true feelings. Finally, she is accompanied by the departure of everyone and the loneliness. She is also Feidie's aunt. |
| Lizi (小李子) | Deputy director of the imperial kitchen of the Qing dynasty, adopted son of Li Lianying (mentioned in the first episode). His lust for power leads him to be bribed by villain K, who repeatedly tries to get Cixi to dethrone the Guangxu Emperor. He tries all sorts of sinister tricks, but always fails. He is narcissistic and lecherous. He sometimes hates Fugui because he loves Feidie. His catchphrase was: "This is so painful!" Lizi was motivated by K to do bad things as K promised that he can let Lizi see his parents (Lizi believes that his parents are still live and just missing). In the finale, Eunuch Ma tells him that his parents starved to death before he enters the palace. He loses his best friends (Fugui, Feidie) and is sent to Yingtai to accompany arrested Guangxu Emperor. |
| Eunuch Ma (马太监) | Cixi's personal eunuch, he is dedicated to the life of Cixi. He is timid and dutiful, loyal to his master. Often supports Fugui, is a good helper of Fugui. |
| Mifeng (小蜜蜂) | K's stepdaughter, kind and pure, has always listened to the order of her step-father. Pretending to be blind when performing the task, but her task was destructed by Lizi and exposes her identity; At the same time, when she is in distress, she is saved by Fugui, so she decides to violate the order of her step-father to help Fugui. In the heart of Mifeng, the adopted father is a good one who can forgive her no matter what Mifeng has done, but K is not as good as the one in her heart. Finally, she is killed by one of K's subordinate and tells Lizi's plot to Fugui before she died. |
| Old Imperial Physician (老太医) | Loyal ministers in the palace, kind and sincere, often saves Fugui out of danger. In Episode 120, Fugui restores the taste with his help. Later, in order to find a way to cure Feidie, he has to leave Fugui. Then he hears about K's plot. When the killer is going to kill Fugui, he saves Fugui life and at the same time died with the killer. |
| K (K大人) | The head of the old guard, ruthless. Because he opposes Guangxu Emperor's reform, he tries to bribe Lizi to harm the Emperor, and then he arranges Lizi to deal with Fugui as Fugui destroys their plan intangibly. Finally he succeeded in making Fugui leave the palace. |

== Music ==
| Title | Place | Vocal by |
|---|---|---|
| ‘Fugui the Little Magic Cook'(神厨小福贵） | The opening song | Xingcan Zhou, Yiqun Zhou, Ting Yan |
| ‘I am crazy about cooking’ (我为厨艺狂 | The ending song | Xingcan Zhou, Yiqun Zhou, Ting Yan |

== Award and Nomination ==
2007 Was selected as the fourth batch of Excellent Domestic cartoons in 2007

In 2008, won the first prize of national children's program and animation—excellent animation in 2007

In 2008, won the "Five one Project" award of the tenth Spiritual Civilization construction animation project in Hunan Province

In 2009, won the best TV Animation award and the best Creative Award in the 4th China Jilin International Animation Exhibition

In 2009, was nominated for the "Golden Panda" Award of the 10th Sichuan Television Festival —best ANIMATED TV Series and best screenwriter

Selected as one of the first key animation products in China in 2010

In addition, the image of "Little Fugui" won the top ten favorite cartoon images of audiences in 2011 "Beautiful Monkey Award"

== Broadcast Ratings ==
1. In August 2007, ‘Fugui the Little Magic Cook’ was hit by more than 500 TV stations across the country. When it was hit, the audience rating reached 11%, breaking the audience rating record again and becoming a popular animation.

2. In August 2007, ‘Fugui the Little Magic Cook’ was broadcast on Golden Eagle Cartoon. Since the broadcast, the audience rating has been rising steadily, reaching 1.8% on August 5, with a market share of 8.93%, ranking the first place in golden Eagle cartoon program. The audience rating of the program is also much higher than that of other children's programs broadcast at the same time.

3. In February 2008, 60 episodes of ‘Fugui the Little Magic Cook’ were aired on CCTV children's Animation Dream Factory, with an average audience rating of 4.72% (higher than the average audience rating of Animation Dream Factory which is 4.33%) and the highest audience rating was 5.85%. According to the information feedback of 33 major markets in China, the total audience rating of 23 markets is more than 10, which stands out among the regular children's programs and becomes the program with the highest broadcast rate and audience rating.

4. Since it was broadcast on CCTV 8 in 2011, ‘Fugui the Little Magic Cook’ has achieved an average audience rating of 0.42%, ranking first among all the programs on CCTV 8, and even the first among animation programs ever broadcast on the channel.

== Evaluation ==
"Fugui the Little Magic Cook" as a more targeted inspirational work for young people, will have a profound impact on the quality of education for the young. In the cartoon, Fugui and "Changjin" are similar, as they all have good personality of kindness, perseverance, and positive enterprising, which will encourage the majority of young people to make progress and work hard.

The film's content is positive, its plot ups and downs, shaping the images of characters lively, like Fugui and Feidie, and other sincere good, brave and wise personalities. It is an inspirational animation with historical theme. (State Administration of Radio, Film and Television Review)

"Its characters are not single young children, compared with the previous characters in fairy tale cartoon more real; They are more real, distinctive and more dramatic." (Evaluation of Peng Zhaoping, President of Hunan Children's Publishing House)

"Fugui the Little Magic Cook" inspires young people to forge ahead. The educational significance of the work was highly recognized by Zhang Zhaohui, deputy director of the Youth Department of the Youth League central Committee and deputy Director of the National Youth Working Committee.

== Overview of Episodes ==
| Episode | Summary |
|---|---|
| 1 | The chef Fugui Hong forced his grandson Little Fugui to learn cooking, revitalize the family business. When Cixi escaped to their town, she caught Little Fugui's grandpa to cook for her; Little Fugui felt angry and sad. |
| 2 | K let Xiao Lizi to poison Cixi's food to blame emperor Guangxu for usurping the throne. While the chef was cooking, Xiao Lizi took the opportunity to poison the meal. So the chef went to jail. Empress Dowager Cixi was furious and Guangxu emperor was held in captivity. |
| 3 | Lizi cannot recruit a cook, he offers great financial conditions (a free gold medal). Fugui answers the call. He cooks by his divine fingers, but the dishes he makes are extremely bad. Cixi is so hungry that she ate three bowls. Therefore, Fugui is staying. |
| 4 | When Fugui cooked, he broke the rules of the imperial kitchen unintentionally. Lizi gives him special tests, which Fuigui barely passes. |
| 5 | Fugui and Lizi search everywhere for meat, we only find three eggs, but one egg is stolen by a mouse. When they chase the mouse, one egg is broken, and the other one hatches a chick and runs away. Lizi and Fugui are angry, we catch the mice and beat it. "Lizi!!" exclaimed by Cixi as she eats the rat meat. |
| 6 | Cixi is sick, Lizi thought it is the problem of rat soup. He suspects it is toxic. Lizi locked up Fugui. Fugui is urgent, he wants to investigate Cixi's disease. Cixi's illness is getting worse. lizi wants to declare Fugui's crime, but find Fugui has fled. Fugui investigates the meal left by Cixi, and find out they are non-toxic. He also finds out the cause of Cixi's disease. Lizi captured Fugui, he wants to execute Fugui as soon as possible. |
| 7 | After finding an old doctor, he finds out Cixi's disease is caused by overeating and drinking. The doctor prescribes a medicated diet. Lizi is trying to kill Fugui, but there comes the news of needing a cook to make medicated food. Fugui lives. Fugui seeks medicated food material, however, he cannot gather them together all by himself. think of grandpa folk prescription, use existing material to make medicated food. Cixi recovered from the serious illness and left town. Fugui can be spared the death penalty, but not escape the punishment, he travels with the queen to the west. Under the cue of Lizi, Fugui decides to use pigeon as the material of soup for Cixi. |
| 8 | Fugui looks for pigeons. Guangxu has illusions due to stave. The old doctor diagnosis and treats to eat. Fugui catches the pigeon, but when it came to cooking, lizi found that it was the carrier pigeon he had been waiting for. Fugui unexpectedly gives Lizi the letter with "poison emperor" inside. Lizi doubts Fugui knows the secret letter content, he decided to kill him. |
| 9 | Fugui makes expensive pigeon meat to tonic for the queen. Lizi comes to test indirectly to see if Fugui knows the words on the letter, and finally learns that little Fugui did not know, rest assured. Fugui is intended to give the pigeon meat to Cixi, but the emperor is hungry, so the kind Fugui gives the pigeon soup to Guangxu first. Lizi have the opportunity to punish Fugui. Cixi is angry. At the same time, a crowd of people come. |
| 10 | Cixi thought it was citizens to welcome her, but it is bandits, the team is in chaos. Cixi is in danger and cries out for Lizi, who is afraid of death but only wants to save his own life. Guangxu see this and save Cixi, but because of the long-term hunger, his power is limited. Cixi is touched. When the crisis comes Fugui sacrifices himself to save Cixi. Then Cixi is safe, crisis is lifts. Cixi is satisfied with the Fugui, Fugui takes this opportunity to put forward his requirements: he hope to be part of the accompanied chef. Cixi decided to test him with three dishes, the first test is cooking fish. |

== Miscellaneous ==
Although the show is Chinese, they use simple English at times, such as "Yes", "Ok" or "No". The character Xiao Lizi is a much younger version of Li Lianying, who was a real-life servant of the Empress Dowager Cixi until her death in 1908; Li Lianying died three years later in 1911, at the age of 62. The show is supposed to be in the olden days, but sometimes they have parodies of modern inventions or they sing modern songs at time.
