= Fukui Station (Tochigi) =

Railway station in Ashikaga, Tochigi Prefecture, Japan

TI13 Fukui Station 福居駅
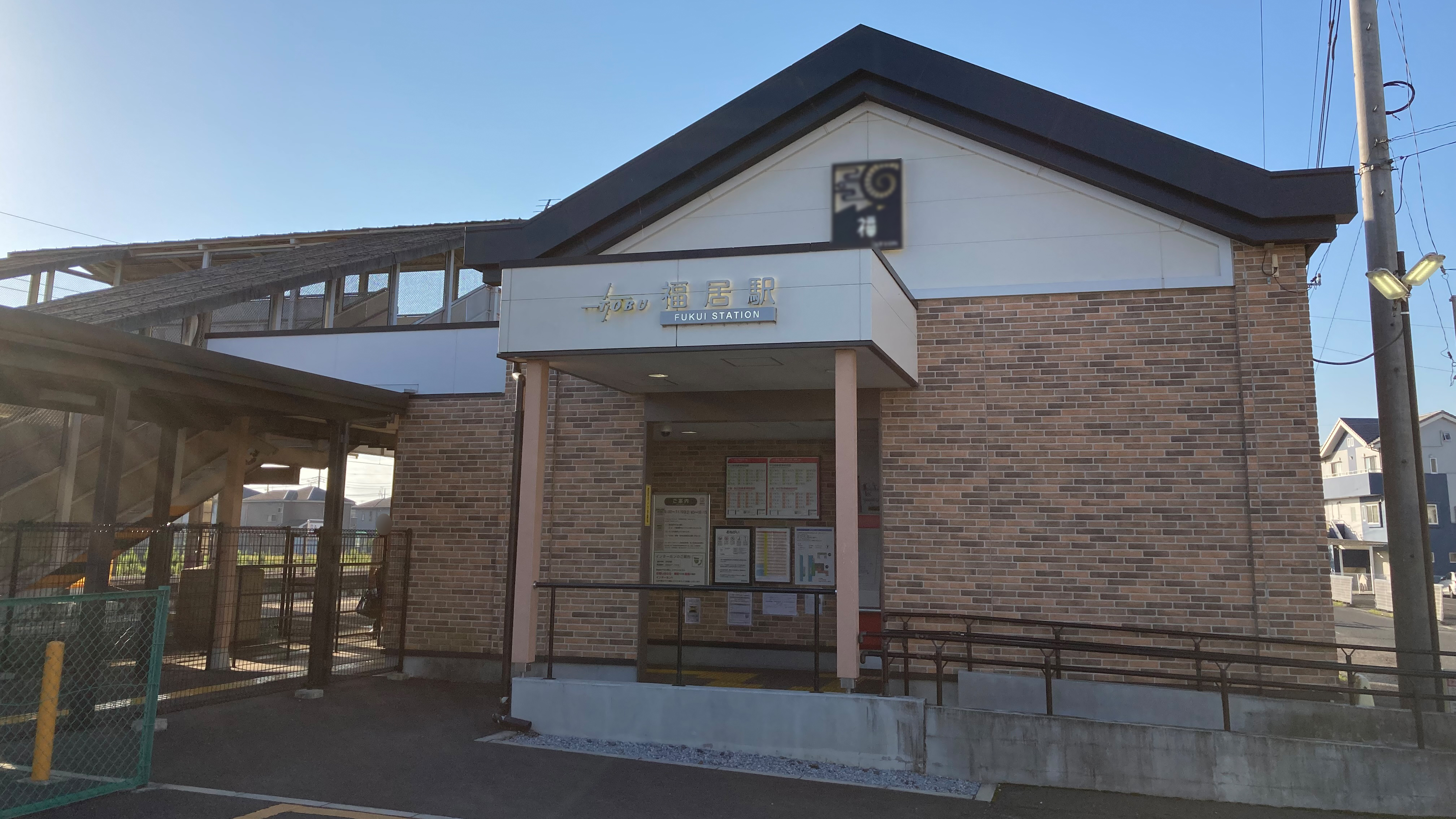
- Fukui Station in September 2021

General information
- Location: Fukui-cho, Ashikaga-shi, Tochigi-ken 326-0338; Japan
- Coordinates: 36.3053°N 139.4589°E
- Operator: Tobu Railway
- Line: Tobu Isesaki Line
- Distance: 83.9 km from Asakusa
- Platforms: 2 side platforms

Other information
- Station code: TI-13
- Website: Official website

History
- Opened: 27 August 1907

Passengers
- FY2020: 810 daily

Services
Preceding station	Tobu Railway	Following station
Agata TI12 towards Tōbu-Dōbutsu-Kōen	Isesaki Line Local	Tōbu-Izumi TI14 towards Isesaki
Location
- Location within Tochigi Prefecture Location within Japan

Fukui Station (福居駅, Fukui-eki) is a railway station in the city of Ashikaga, Tochigi, Japan, operated by the private railway operator Tobu Railway.

== Lines ==
Fukui Station is served by the Tobu Isesaki Line, and is located 83.9 km from the line's Tokyo terminus at Asakusa.

== Station layout ==
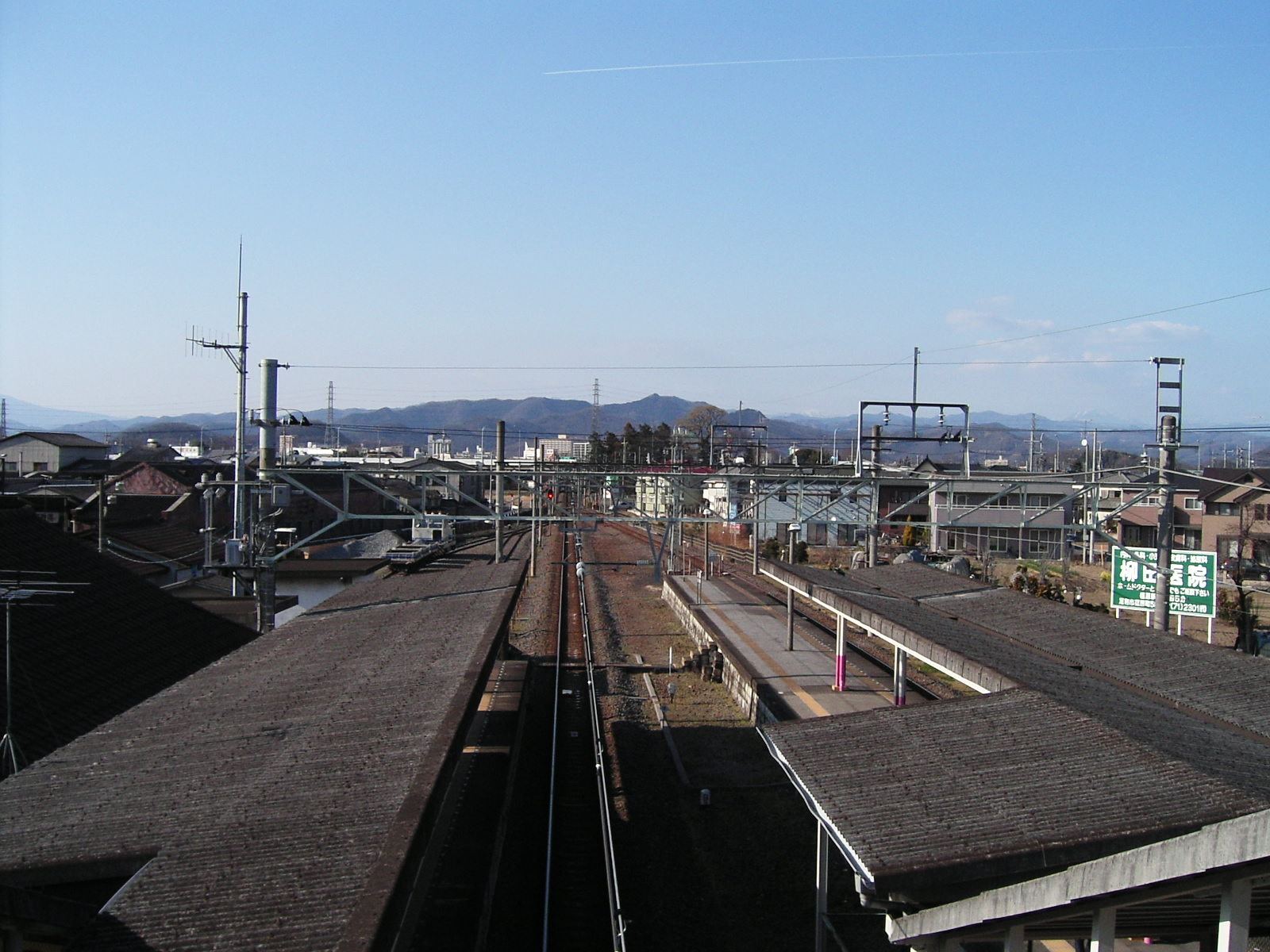
An overview of the station platforms, March 2007

This station has two parallel side platforms, connected to the station building by a footbridge. The same side of each platform (i.e. the side opposite the location of the station building) is used.

=== Platforms ===
1	■ Tobu Isesaki Line	for Ashikagashi and Ōta
2	■ Tobu Isesaki Line	for Tatebayashi, Kuki, Kita-Senju, and Asakusa

== History ==
Fukui Station opened on 27 August 1907.

From 17 March 2012, station numbering was introduced on all Tobu lines, with Fukui Station becoming "TI-13".

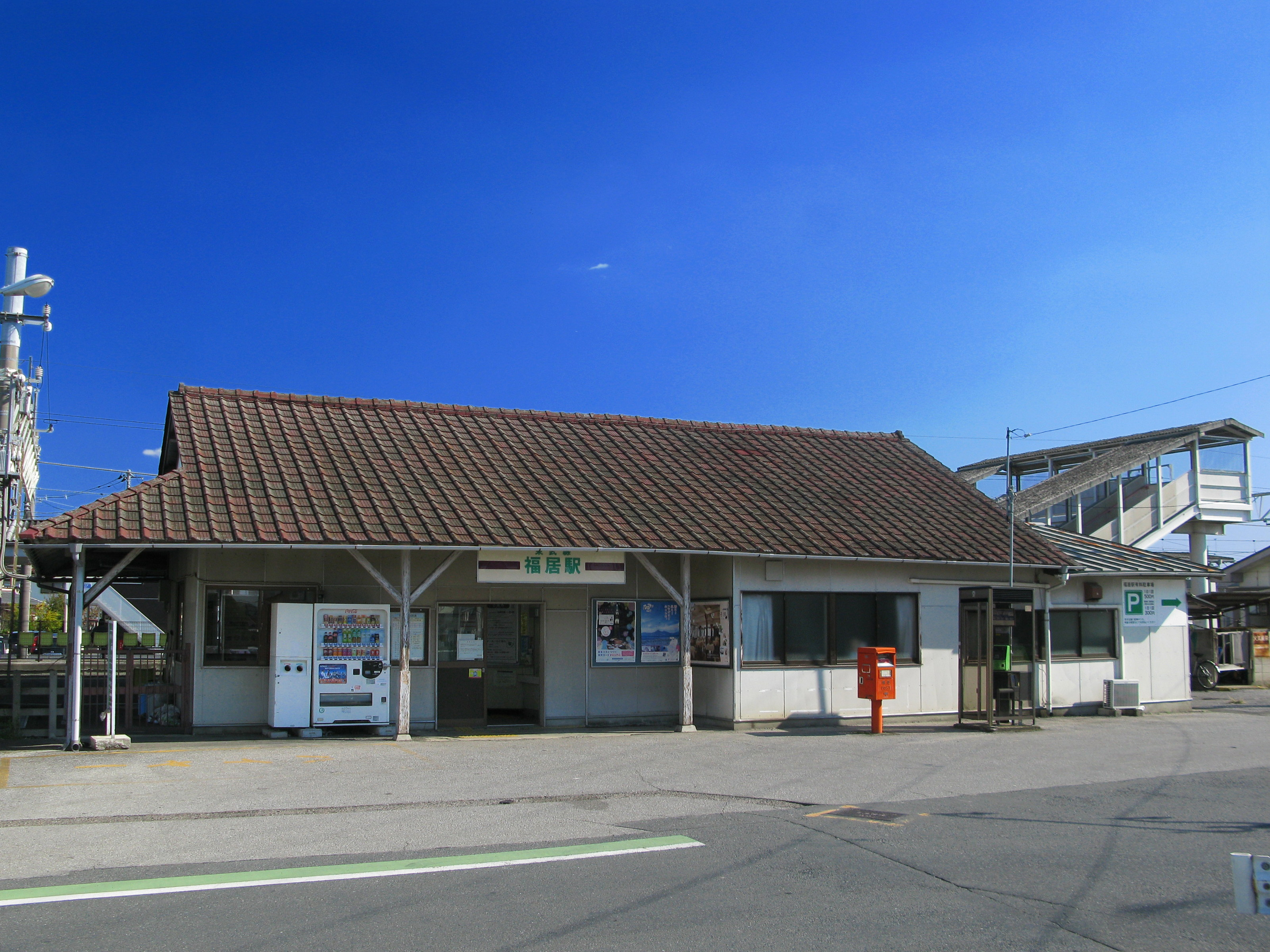
Old station, November 2012

== Passenger statistics ==
In fiscal 2019, the station was used by an average of 810 passengers daily (boarding passengers only).

== Surrounding area ==
- Fukui Post Office
- National Route 50

== See also ==
- List of railway stations in Japan
