= Cape Fugui =

Cape at the northernmost point of the island of Taiwan

- Cape
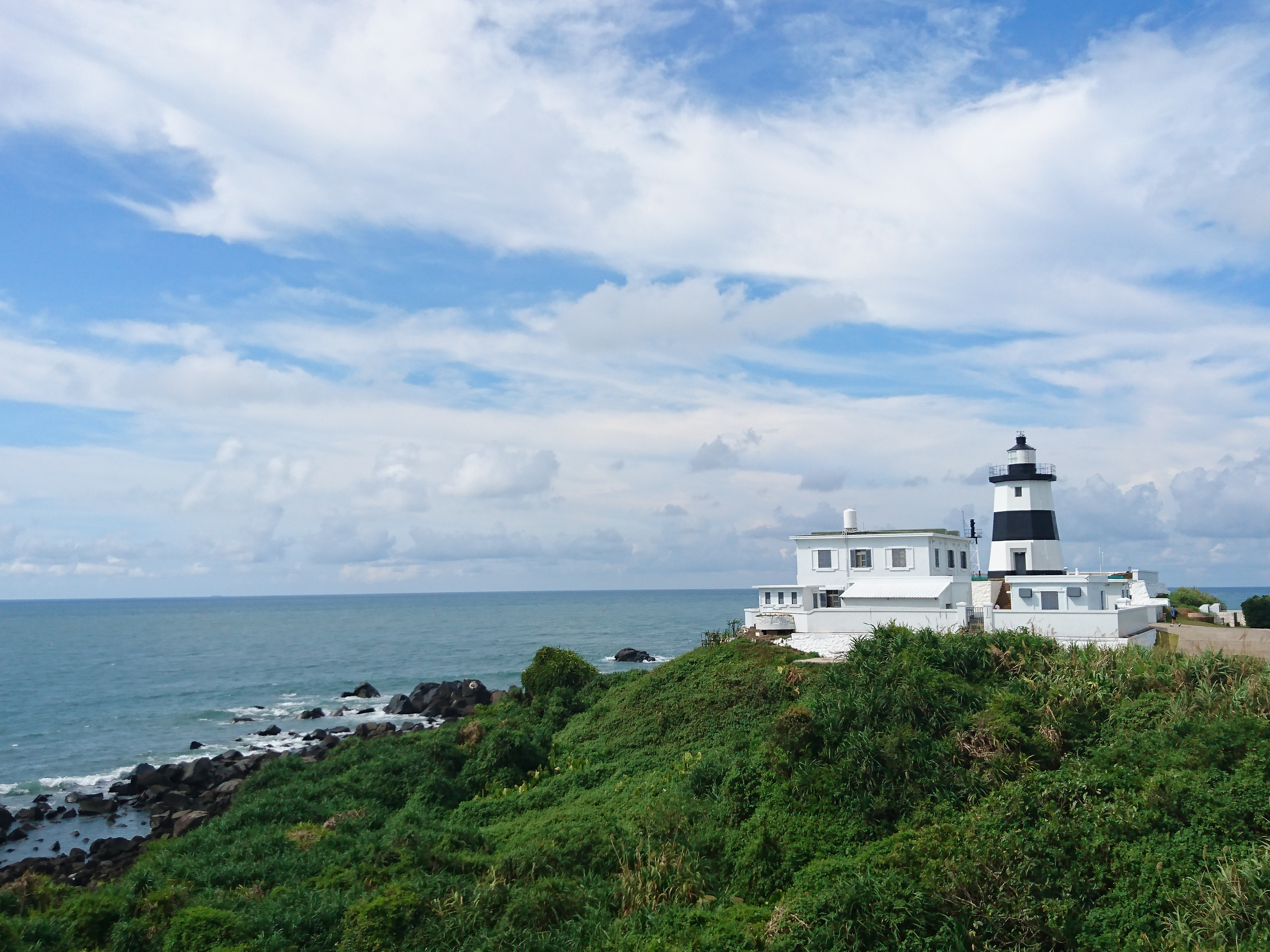
- Fuguijiao Lighthouse overlooking the point

- Coordinates: 25°17′58″N 121°32′13″E
- Location: Shimen District, New Taipei City, Taiwan
- Designation: National park

Cape Fugui
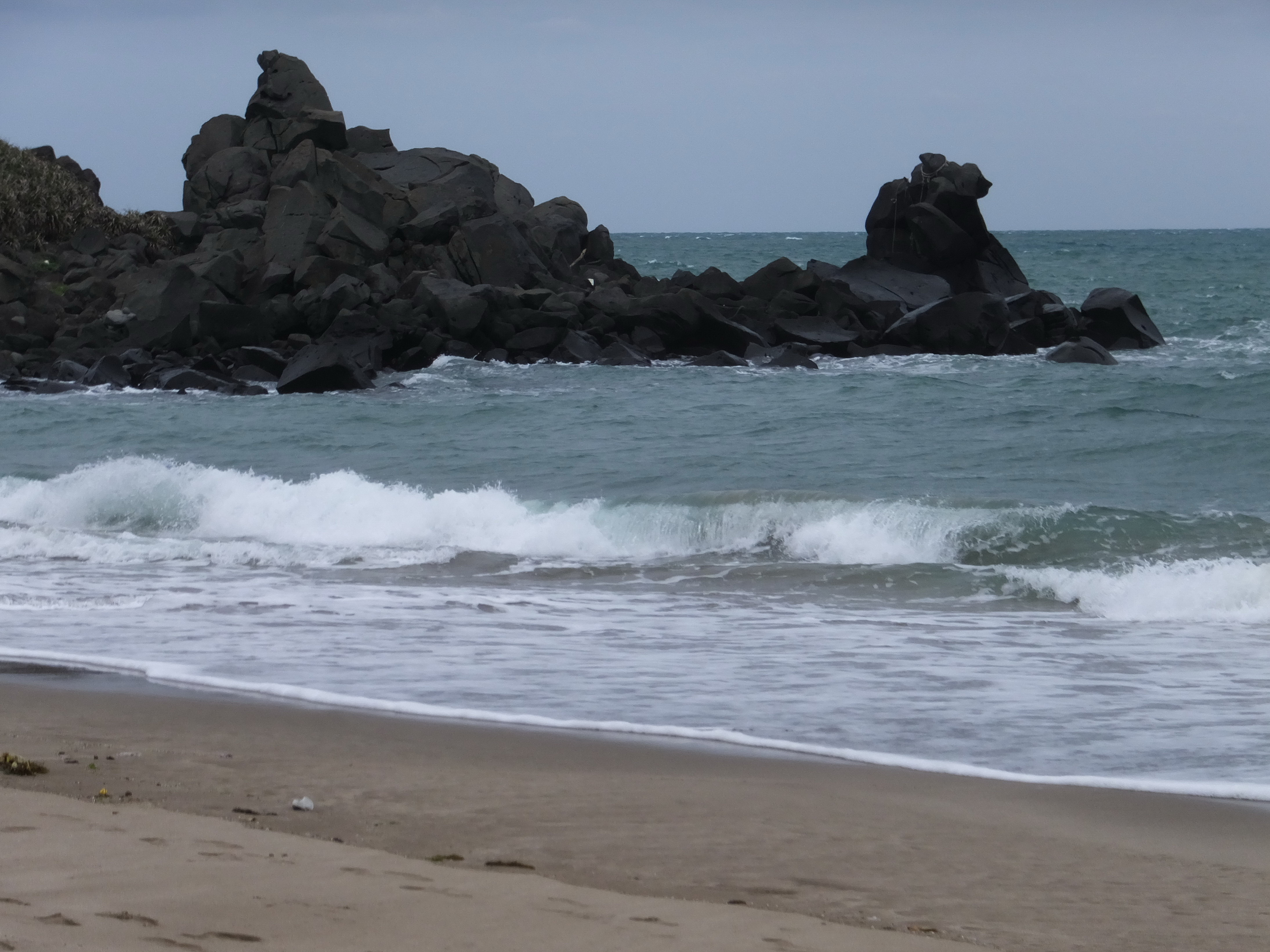
- Dapian Point (2015)

Chinese name
- Traditional Chinese: 富貴角
- Postal: Fukwei
- Literal meaning: transcription of Dutch hoek, meaning "cape"
Transcriptions
Standard Mandarin
- Hanyu Pinyin: Fùguìjiǎo
- Wade–Giles: Fu-k‘uei Chiao
- Tongyong Pinyin: Fùgueì Jiǎo
Southern Min
- Hokkien POJ: Hù-kùi Kak

Japanese name
- Kanji: 富貴角
- Hiragana: ふうきかく
Transcriptions
- Romanization: Fūki Kaku

Cape Fugui Park
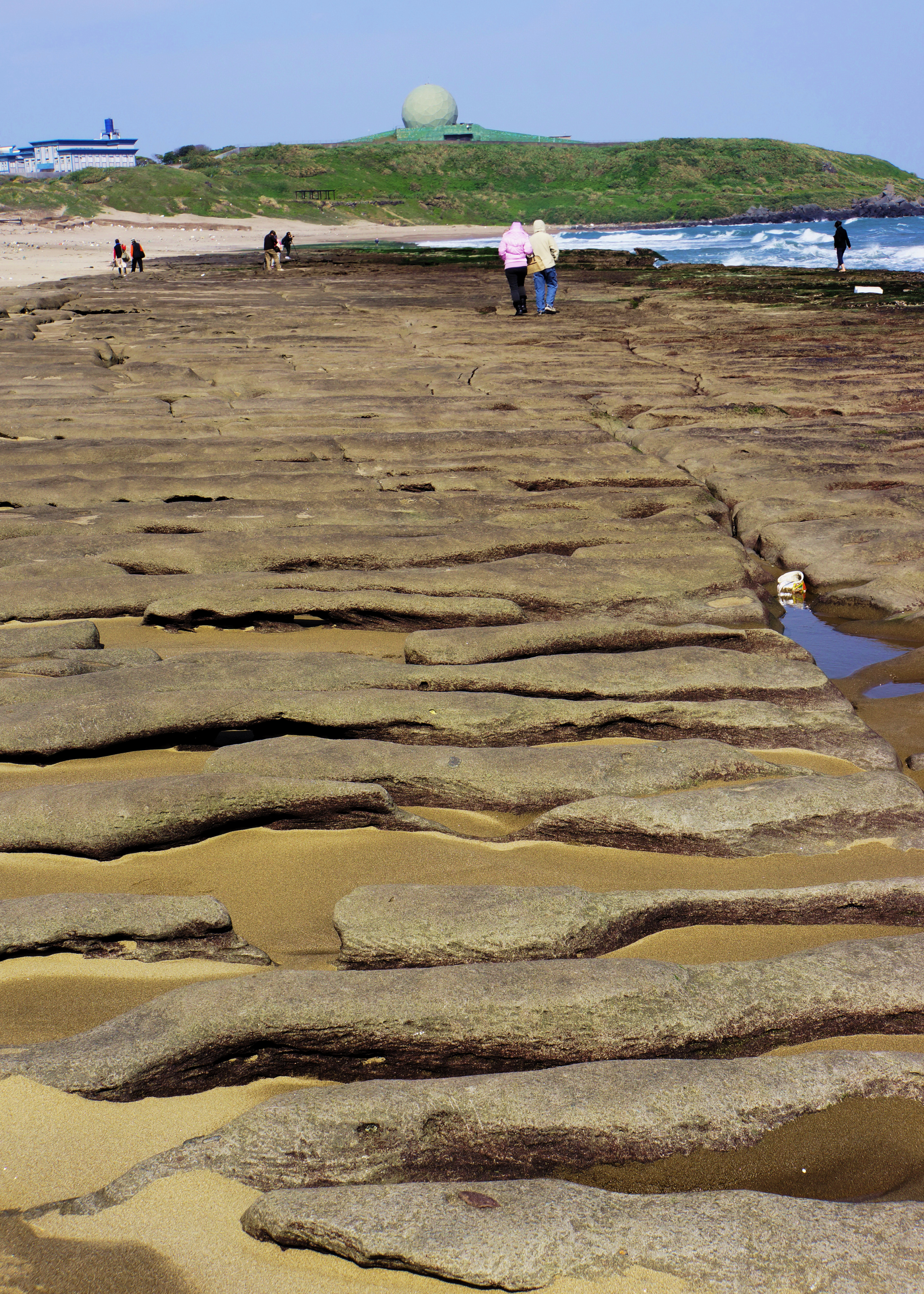
- The rocky beach at Fugui Park (2013)
- Traditional Chinese: 富貴角公園
Transcriptions
Standard Mandarin
- Hanyu Pinyin: Fùguìjiǎo Gōngyuán
- Wade–Giles: Fu-k‘uei Chiao Kung-yüan

Cape Fugui, Cape Fukwei, Fukwei Chiao, Fuguei Cape, or Fugui Cape is a cape located at the northernmost point of the island of Taiwan. It is located in Cape Fugui Park within the Shimen District in New Taipei City.

== Name ==
Fùguì is the pinyin romanization of the Mandarin pronunciation of its Chinese name 富貴角. These characters literally mean "rich and noble Cape" but actually transcribe the local Hokkien pronunciation Hù-kùi, used as a transliteration of the Dutch hoek ("hook; cape").

In the 19th century, it was known as Foki during the period of Qing rule. Under Japanese rule, it was known as Fūki Kaku from the Japanese pronunciation of the same characters. During Taiwan's brief official use of Tongyong Pinyin, it was known as Fuguei.

== Geography ==
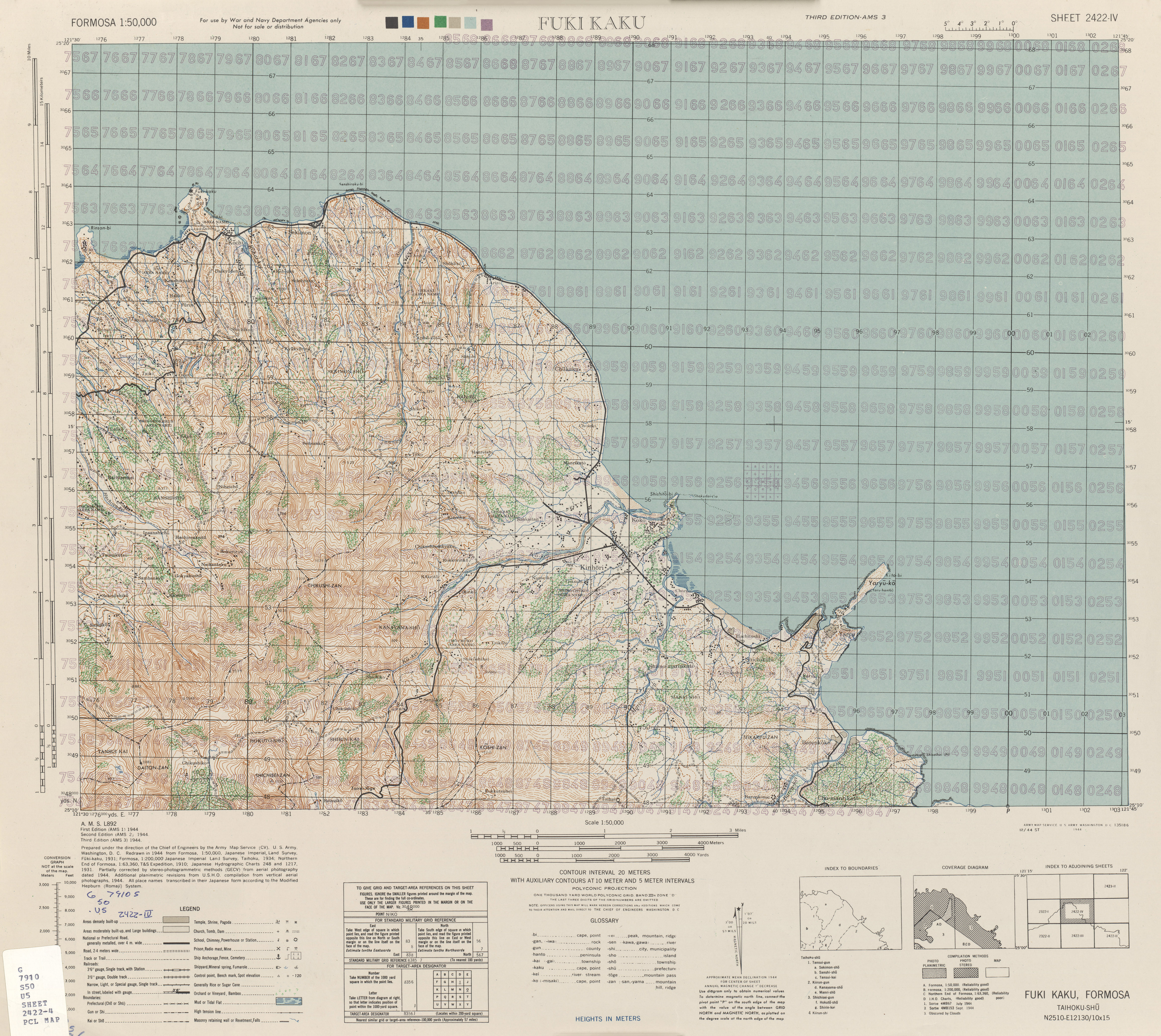
Map including the cape area (labeled as Fūki-kaku) (1944)

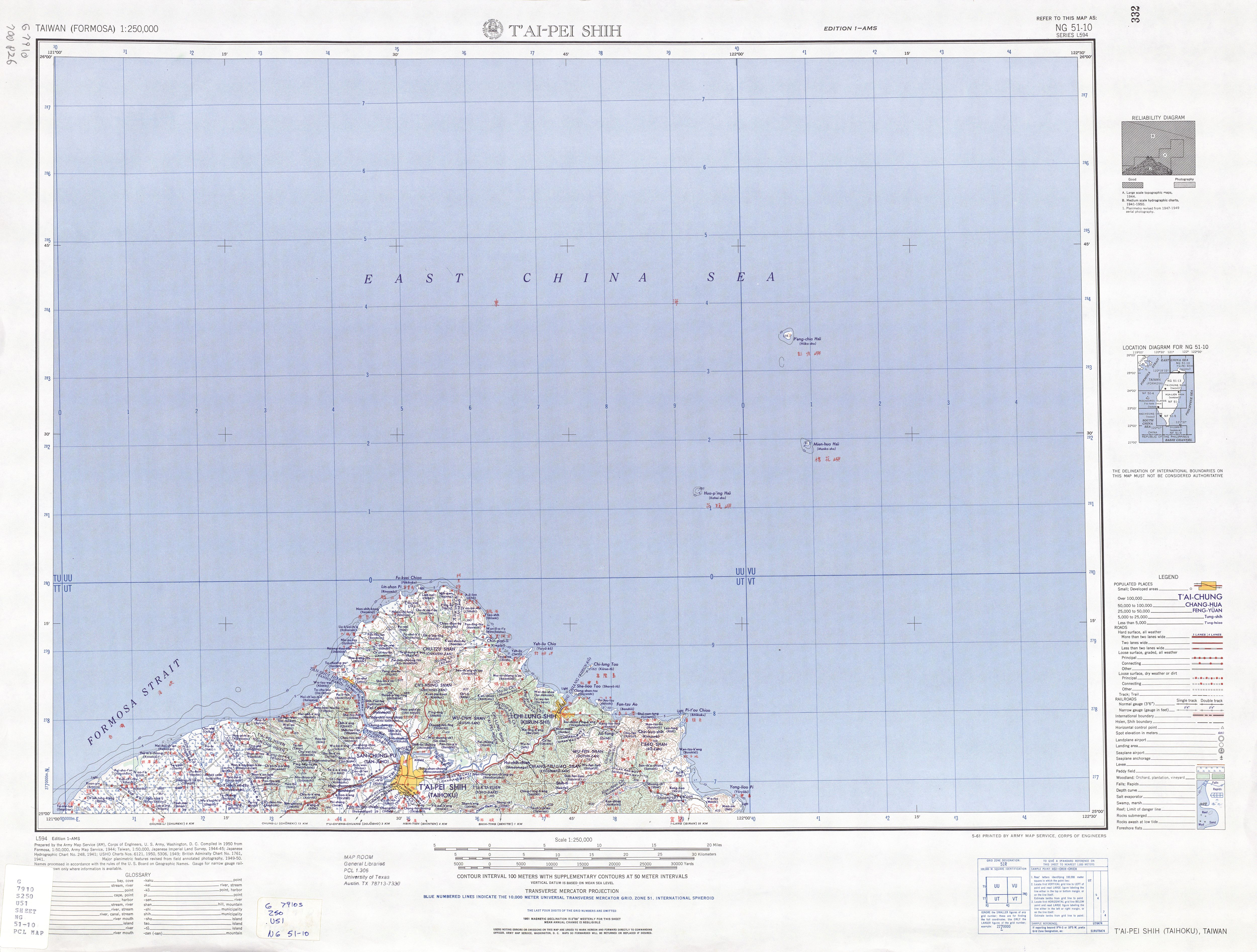
Map including the cape area (labeled as Fu-kuei Chiao (Fūkikaku) 富貴角) (1950)

Cape Fugui is the northernmost point of Formosa or Taiwan Island and forms one end of Laomei Bay.

The cape— under its Japanese name "Fuki Kaku"—forms part of the IHO's current definitions of the East and South China Seas. The still unapproved draft of the 4th edition of the Limits of Oceans and Seas amends the name to its pinyin form Fugui but moves the boundary of the South China Sea from Fugui to Taiwan's southern cape Eluan.

Cape Fugui is also considered part of the northern border of the Taiwan Strait.

== History ==
The Japanese administration erected a building on the cape in 1896 as the endpoint of an undersea cable. It was destroyed during the Second World War. The present lighthouse was erected by the Taiwanese government in 1949 to help guide shipping and received its present black-and-white octagonal tower in 1962. It was opened to the public in 2015, but entry is only permitted on the weekends as it remains an active radar station of the Taiwanese Air Force.

== Park ==
Cape Fugui or Fuguijiao Park surrounds the headland. It includes a rocky beach with ventifacts (wind-shaped rocks) and lush tropical vegetation. There is a walking trail around the cape from Fuji Harbor (t 富基漁港, Fùjī Yúgǎng) to Laomei Village and the brick Laomei Maze. Old barracks from the Taiwanese armed forces have been converted into an arts center. In September and October, the park forms part of Shimen District's kite festival.

== Transportation ==
The cape is about 26 kilometers (16 mi) along Provincial Highway 2. It is sometimes inaccessible because of rockslides during heavy rain, as during June 2017.

== Gallery ==
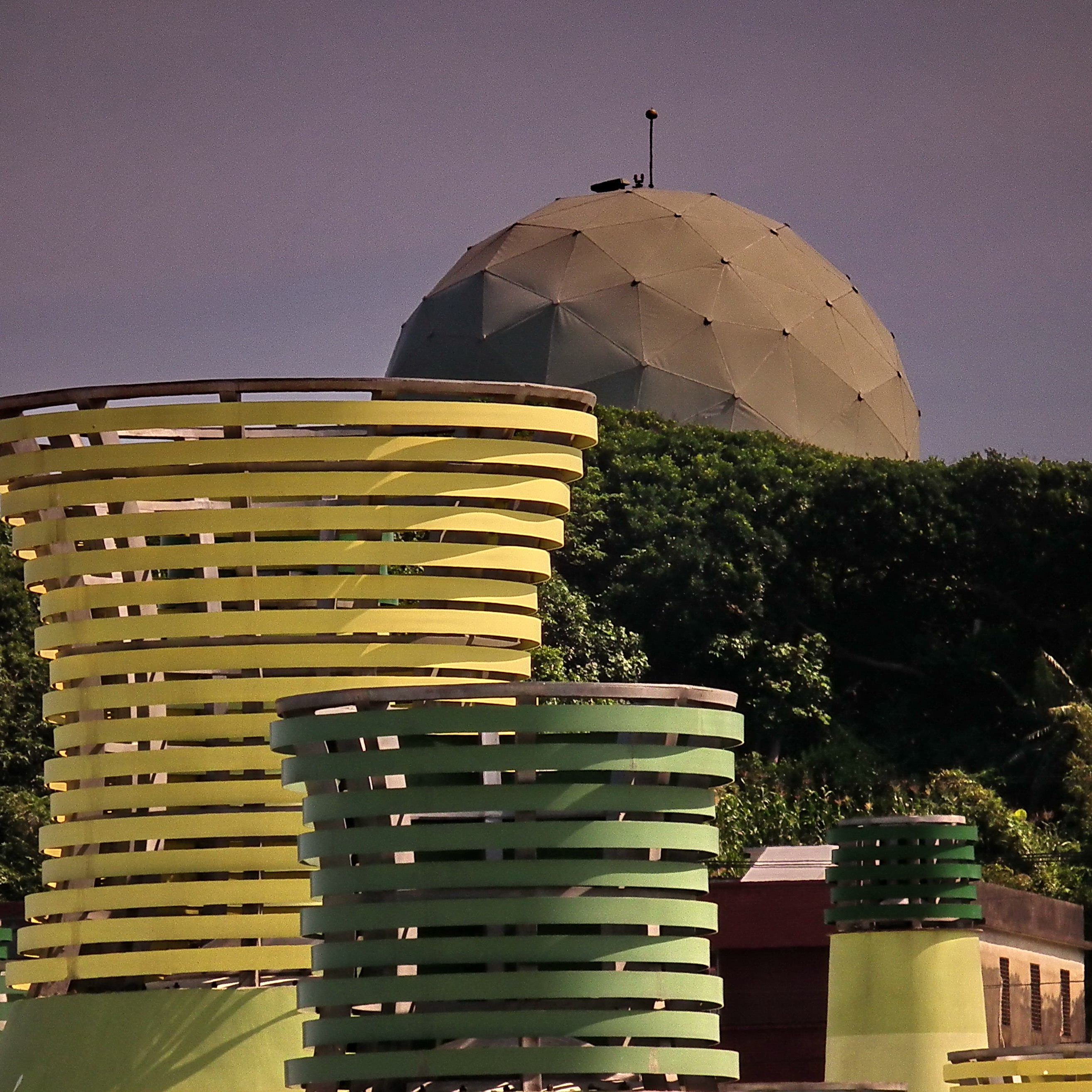
The radar installation at Cape Fugui (2011)

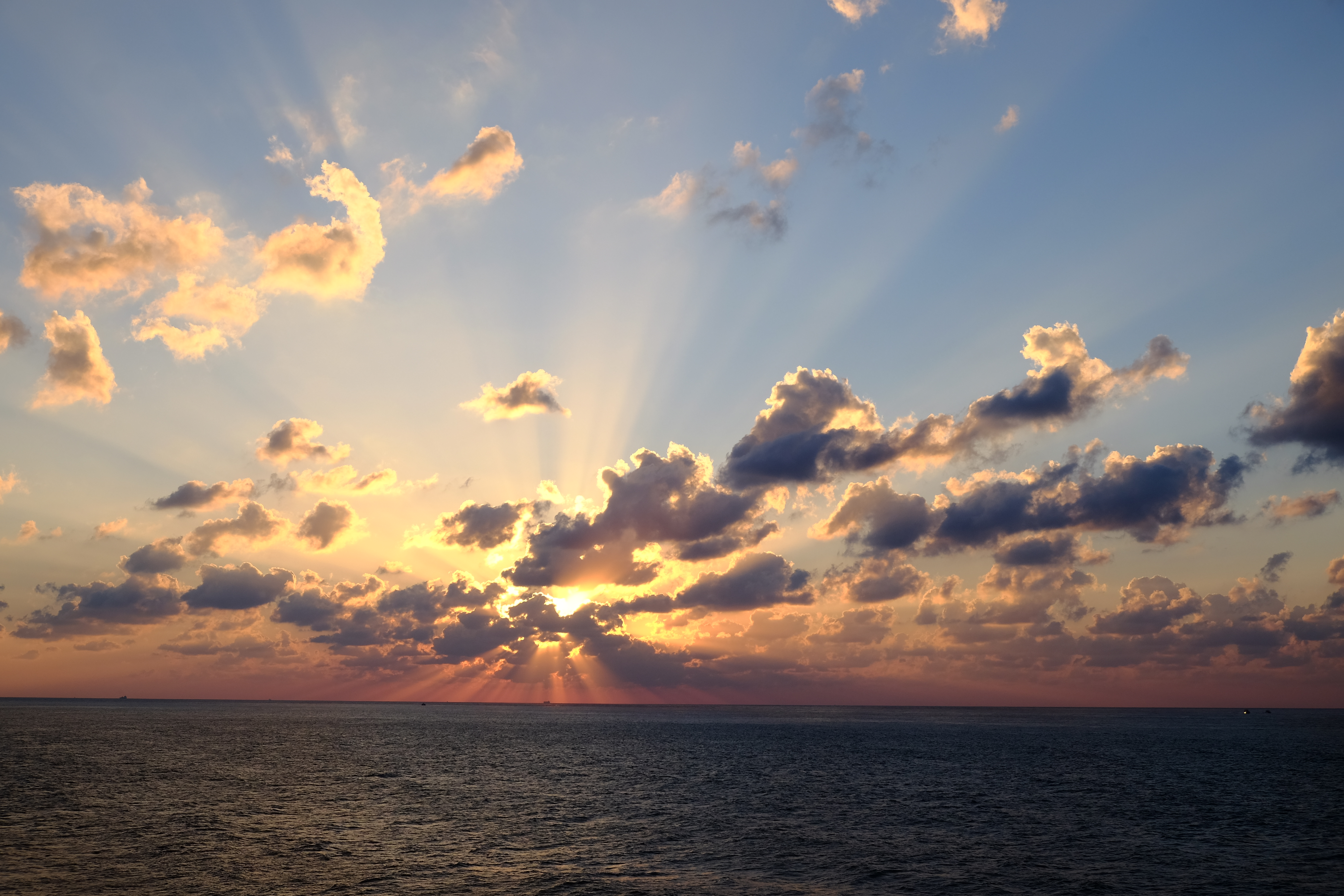
The sunset over the Taiwan Strait at Fugui (2015)

Sightseers watching the sunset at Fugui (2015)

== See also ==
- Cape Fugui Lighthouse
- Cape Eluanbi, the southernmost point on Taiwan
