= Jūsanpōzuka Site =

Archaeological site in Isesaki, Kantō, Japan

Jūsanpōzuka iseki
- 十三宝塚遺跡 (Japanese)
- Jūsanpōzuka iseki Jūsanpōzuka Site (Japan)
- 36°18′48″N 139°14′13″E
- Periods: Nara to Heian period
- Location: Isesaki, Gunma, Japan
- Region: Kantō region

Site notes
- Public access: Yes (no public facilities)

The Jūsanpōzuka iseki (十三宝塚遺跡) is an archaeological site with the ruins of a Nara to Heian period regional administrative complex, located in the Sakaiiyoku neighborhood of the city of Isesaki, Gunma Prefecture in the northern Kantō region of Japan. The site was designated a National Historic Site of Japan in 1988.

== Overview ==
In the late Nara period, after the establishment of a centralized government under the Ritsuryō system and Taika Reforms, local rule over the provinces was standardized under a kokufu (provincial capital), and each province was divided into smaller administrative districts, known as (郡, gun, kōri), composed of 2–20 townships in 715 AD. Each of the units featured an administrative complex that was constructed using a plan that was loosely based on modern Chinese architecture.

The Jūsanpōzuka site is located on a plateau formed at the end of the foothills of Mount Akagi, east of the city. It consists of the ruins of an enclosure with dimensions of 180 meters east-to-west and 250 meters north-to-south, with the remnants of a moat on the north, west, and south sides. In the north-central part of this enclosure is the remains of a secondary enclosure with the foundations of a large gate, and the foundation of a large pillared building on a platform the center. This secondary enclosure was trapezoidal with 82 meters on the south and west sides, 92 meters on the east side, and 60 meter on the north side. Both enclosures were protected by palisades. Since this arrangement is typical for the layout of a county-level administrative complex as stipulated under the Ritsuryō system, it is presumed to have been the Nara period county seat for a "Saki County" in Kōzuke Province mentioned in ancient documents such as the Wamyō Ruijushō. This theory has been reinforced by the discovery of roof tiles with acronyms for many of the township names in the Saki area.

The site was backfilled after archaeological excavation, and there is nothing but an empty field with an explanatory plaque. It is located approximately a 30-minute walk from Gōshi Station on the Tōbu Isesaki Line.

== See also ==
- List of Historic Sites of Japan (Gunma)
