= Wado Station =

Railway station in Miyashiro, Saitama Prefecture, Japan

TI01 Wado Station 和戸駅
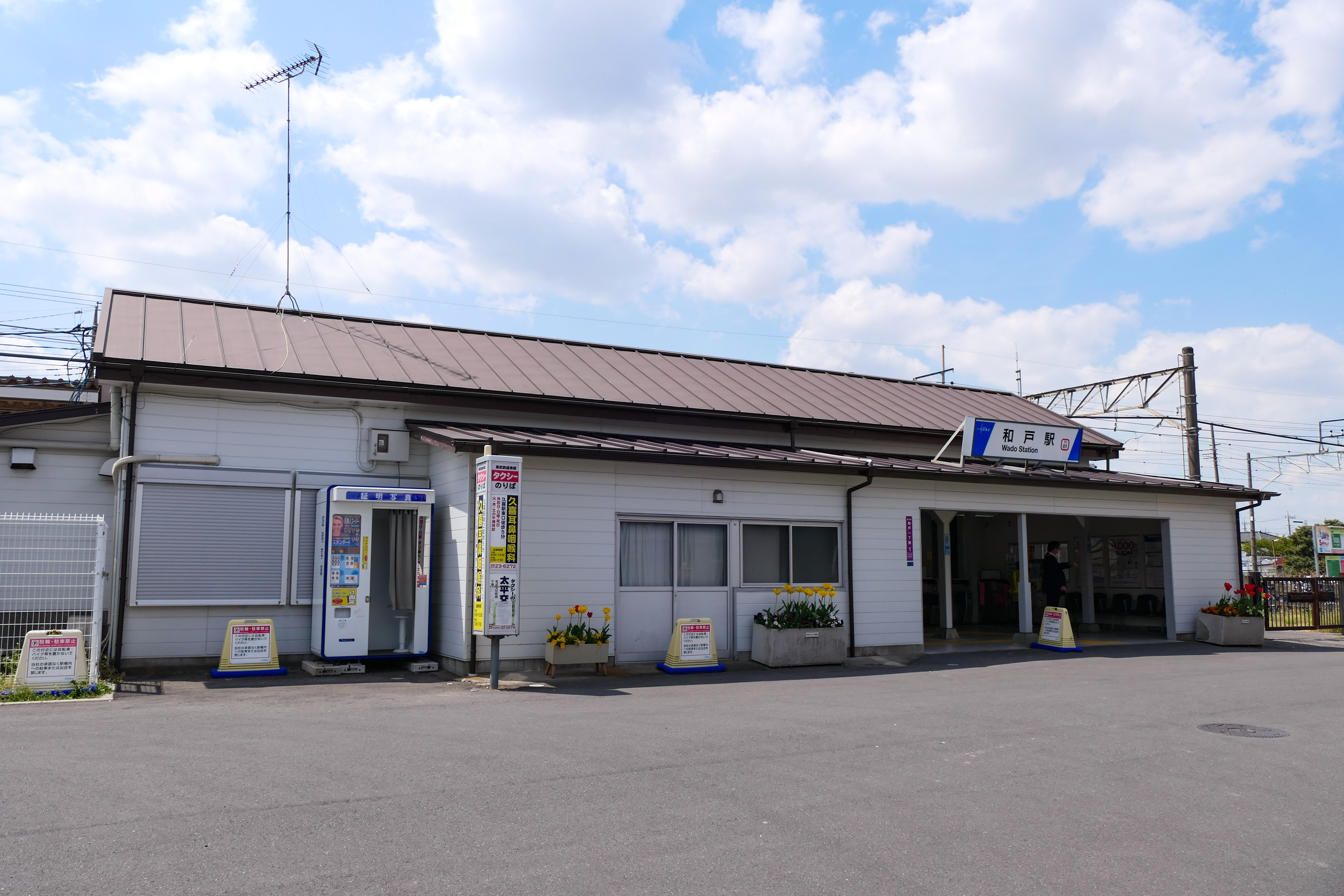
- Wado Station in April 2021

General information
- Location: 1-1-1 Wado, Miyashiro-cho, Minamisaitama-gun, Saitama-ken 345-0836; Japan
- Coordinates: 36.0396°N 139.7014°E
- Operator: Tōbu Railway
- Line: Tōbu Isesaki Line
- Distance: 43.9 km from Asakusa
- Platforms: 1 island platform
- Tracks: 2

Construction
- Structure type: Ground level

Other information
- Station code: TI-01
- Website: Official website

History
- Opened: 20 December 1899

Passengers
- FY2019: 4,102 daily

Services
Preceding station	Tobu Railway	Following station
Tōbu-Dōbutsu-Kōen TS30 Terminus	Isesaki Line Express	Kuki TI02 Terminus
Tōbu-Dōbutsu-Kōen TS30 Terminus	Isesaki Line Section Express	Kuki TI02 towards Tatebayashi
Tōbu-Dōbutsu-Kōen TS30 Terminus	Isesaki Line Semi Express	Kuki TI02 Terminus
Tōbu-Dōbutsu-Kōen TS30 Terminus	Isesaki Line Section Semi Express	Kuki TI02 towards Tatebayashi
Tōbu-Dōbutsu-Kōen TS30 Terminus	Isesaki Line Local	Kuki TI02 towards Isesaki
Location
- Location within Saitama Prefecture Location within Japan

Wado Station (和戸駅, Wado-eki) is a passenger railway station in the town of Miyashiro, Saitama, Japan, operated by the private railway operator Tōbu Railway.

== Lines ==
Wado Station is served by the Tōbu Isesaki Line, and is located 43.9 km from the Tokyo terminus at Asakusa.

== Station layout ==
This station has one island platform connected to the station building by an underground passage.

=== Platforms ===
1	Tōbu Isesaki Line	for Tōbu-Dōbutsu-Kōen, Kasukabe, Kita-Senju, and Asakusa
2	Tōbu Isesaki Line	for Kuki, Tatebayashi, Ashikagashi, and Ōta

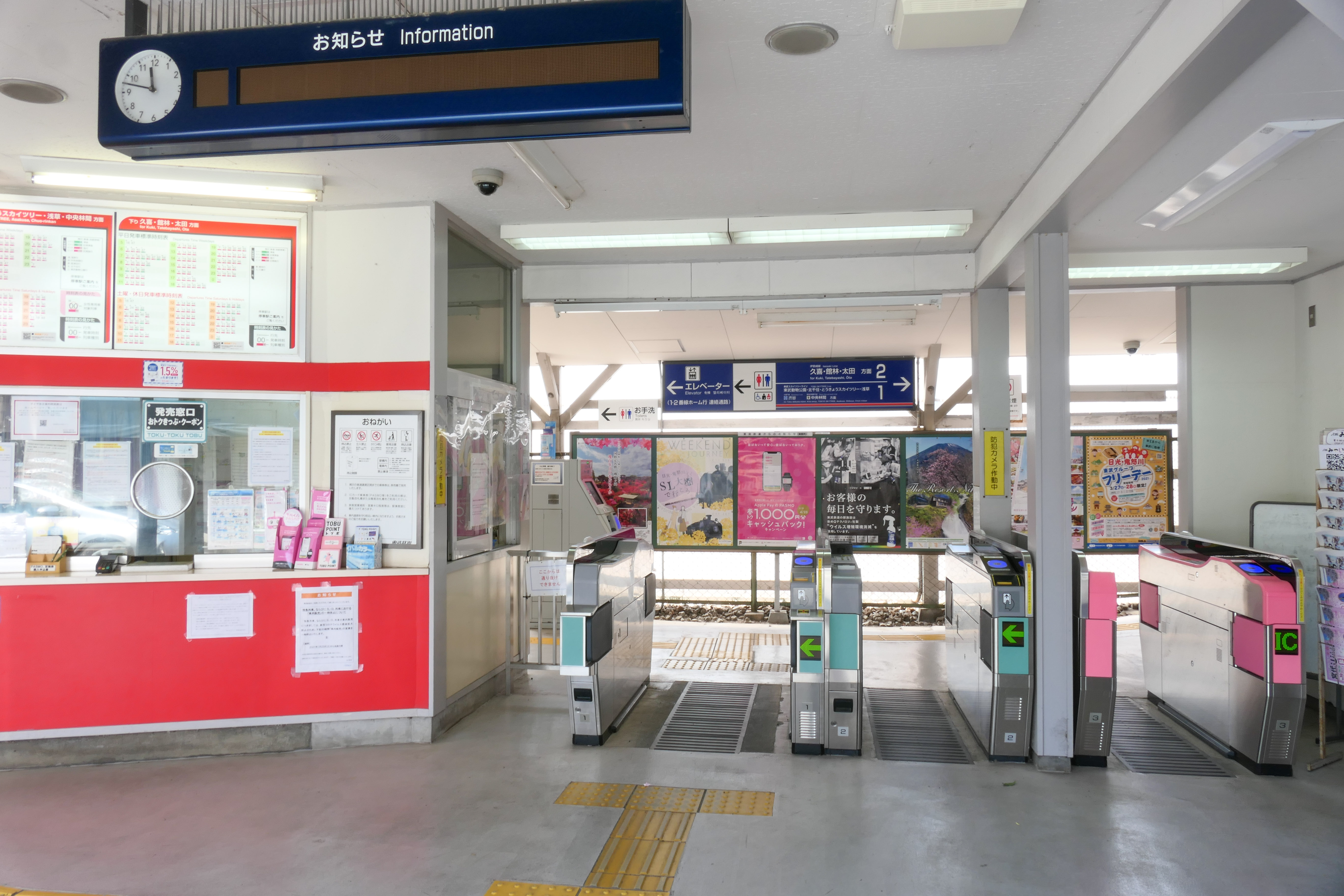
The Gate in April 2021

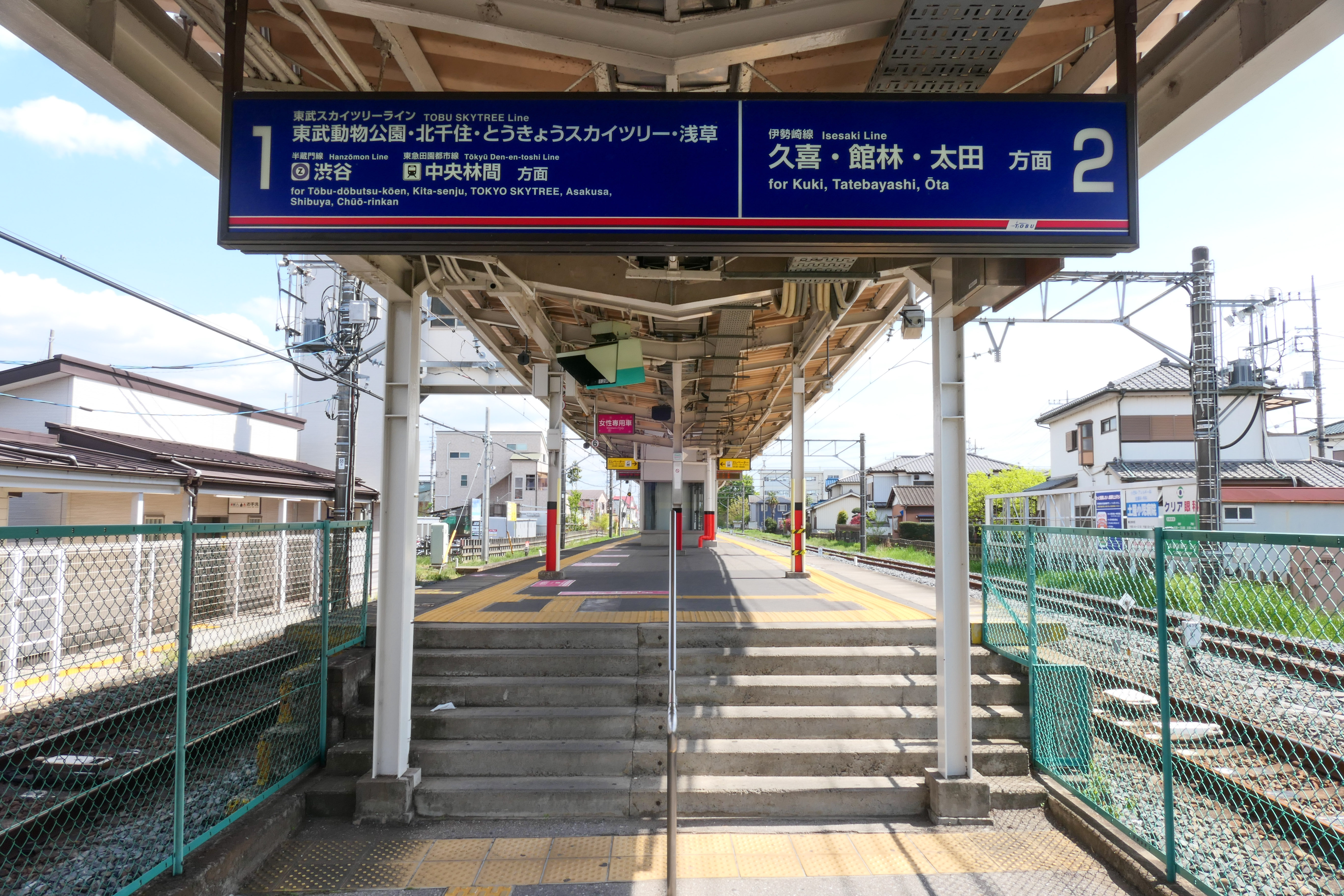
The platforms in April 2021

== History ==
Wado Station opened on 20 December 1899.

From 17 March 2012, station numbering was introduced on all Tōbu lines, with Wado Station becoming "TI-01".

== Passenger statistics ==
In fiscal 2019, the station was used by an average of 4102 passengers daily.

== Surrounding area ==
- Miyashiro-Wado Post Office
- Miyashiro Municipal Suga Elementary School
- Miyashiro Municipal Suga Junior High School

== See also ==
- List of railway stations in Japan
