= Kizaki Station =

Railway station in Ōta, Gunma Prefecture, Japan

TI20 Kizaki Station 木崎駅
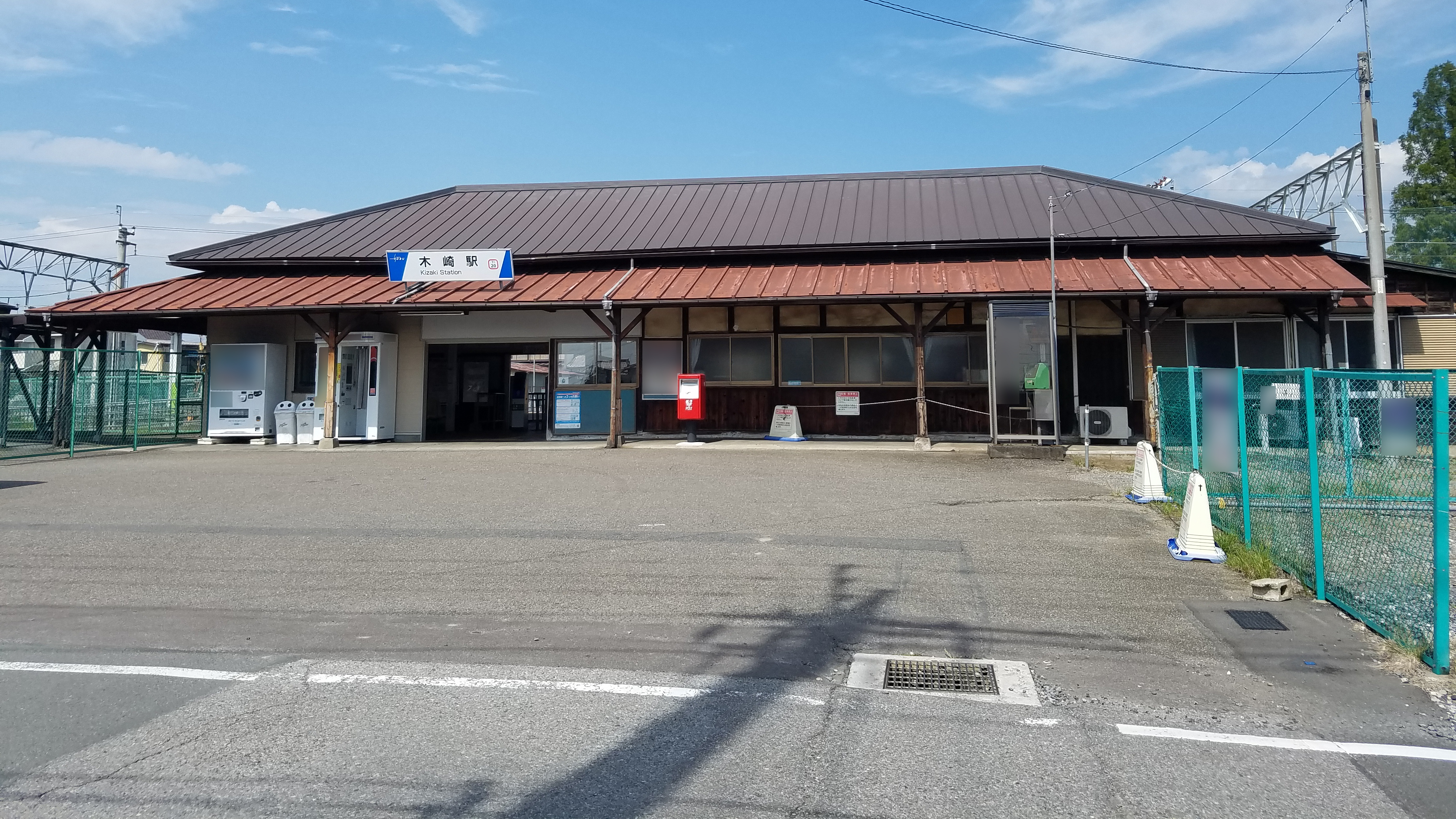
- Kizaki Station in September 2021

General information
- Location: 45 Shinden Kizaki-cho, Ōta-shi, Gunma-ken 370-0321; Japan
- Coordinates: 36.2712°N 139.3129°E
- Operator: Tōbu Railway
- Line: Tōbu Isesaki Line
- Distance: 101.2 km from Asakusa
- Platforms: 2 side platforms

Other information
- Station code: TI-20
- Website: Official website

History
- Opened: 27 March 1910

Passengers
- FY2019: 2470 daily

Services
Preceding station	Tobu Railway	Following station
Ōta TI18 towards Asakusa	Ryomo	Sakaimachi TI22 towards Isesaki
Hosoya TI19 towards Tōbu-Dōbutsu-Kōen	Isesaki Line Local	Serada TI21 towards Isesaki
Location
- Location within Gunma Prefecture Location within Japan

Kizaki Station (木崎駅, Kizaki-eki) is a passenger railway station in the city of Ōta, Gunma, Japan, operated by the private railway operator Tōbu Railway.

== Lines ==
Kizaki Station is served by the Tōbu Isesaki Line, and is located 101.2 kilometers from the terminus of the line at Asakusa in Tokyo.

== Station layout ==
The station consists of two opposed side platforms, connected to the station building by a level crossing.

=== Platforms ===
1	■ Tōbu Isesaki Line	for Ōta
2	■ Tōbu Isesaki Line	for Isesaki

== History ==
Kizaki Station opened on 27 March 1910.

From 17 March 2012, station numbering was introduced on all Tōbu lines, with Kizaki Station becoming "TI-20".

== Passenger statistics ==
In fiscal 2019, the station was used by an average of 2470 passengers daily (boarding passengers only).

== Surrounding area ==
- Former Ojima town hall
- Ojima Post Office
