= Sakaimachi Station =

Railway station in Isesaki, Gunma Prefecture, Japan

TI22 Sakaimachi Station 境町駅
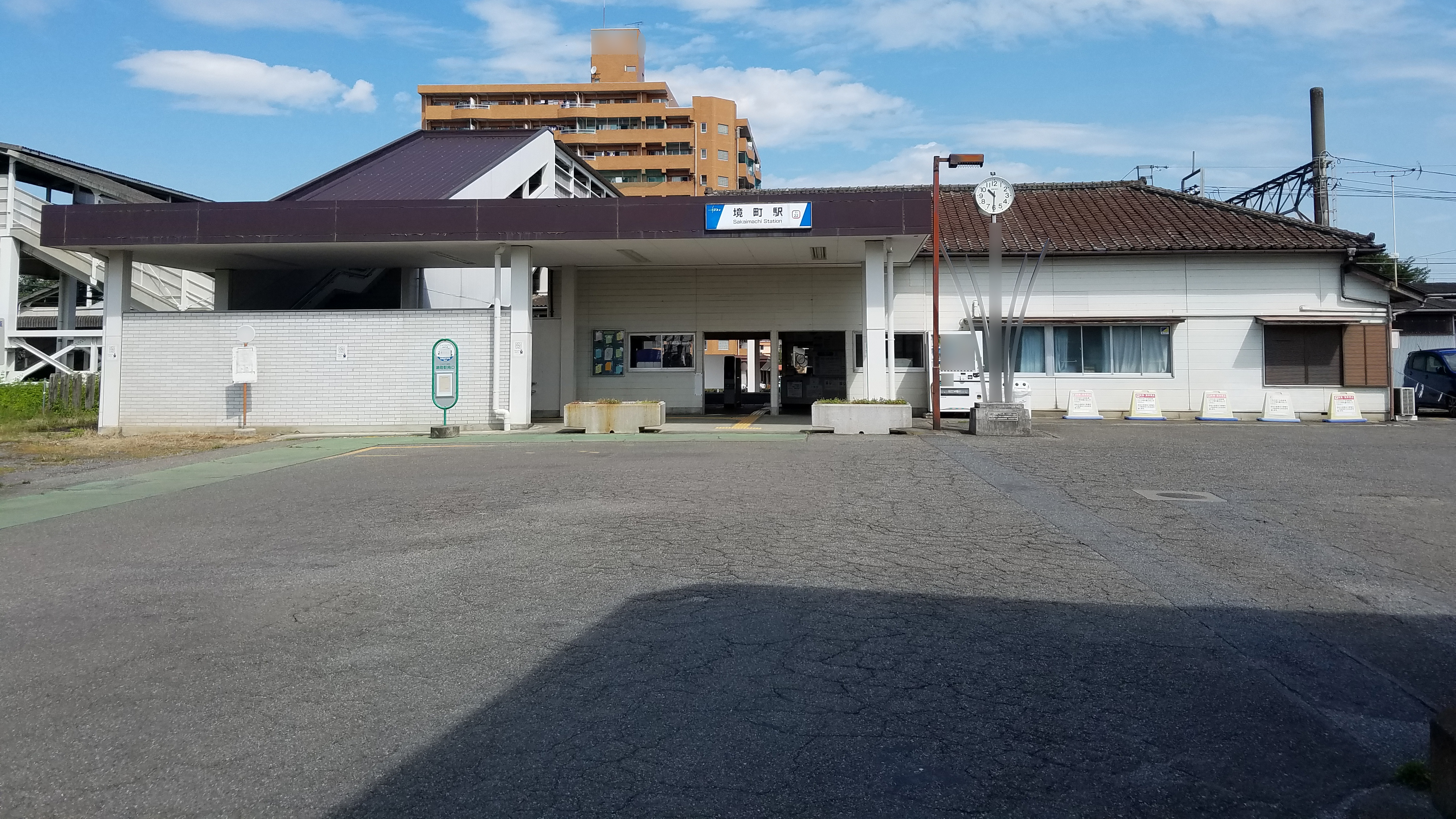
- Sakaimachi Station in September 2021

General information
- Location: 432 Sakaidodo, Isesaki-shi, Gunma-ken 370-0117; Japan
- Coordinates: 36.2770°N 139.2563°E
- Operator: Tōbu Railway
- Line: Tōbu Isesaki Line
- Distance: 106.3 km from Asakusa
- Platforms: 2 side platform

Other information
- Station code: TI-22
- Website: Official website

History
- Opened: 27 March 1910

Passengers
- FY2019: 1569 daily

Services
Preceding station	Tobu Railway	Following station
Kizaki TI20 towards Asakusa	Ryomo	Shin-Isesaki TI24 towards Isesaki
Serada TI21 towards Tōbu-Dōbutsu-Kōen	Isesaki Line Local	Gōshi TI23 towards Isesaki
Location
- Location within Gunma Prefecture Location within Japan

Sakaimachi Station (境町駅, Sakaimachi-eki) is a passenger railway station in the city of Isesaki, Gunma, Japan, operated by the private railway operator Tōbu Railway.

== Lines ==
Sakaimachi Station is served by the Tōbu Isesaki Line, and is located 106.3 kilometers from the terminus of the line at Asakusa in Tokyo.

== Station layout ==
The station has consists of two offset opposed side platforms, connected to the station building by a footbridge.

=== Platforms ===
1	■ Tōbu Isesaki Line	for Isesaki
2	■ Tōbu Isesaki Line	for Ōta, Ashikaga, and Tatebayashi

== History ==
Sakaimachi Station opened on 27 March 1910.

From 17 March 2012, station numbering was introduced on all Tōbu lines, with Sakaimachi Station becoming "TI-22".

== Passenger statistics ==
In fiscal 2019, the station was used by an average of 1569 passengers daily (boarding passengers only).

== Surrounding area ==
- Isesaki City Library
- Isesaki City Gymnasium
- Sakaimachi Post Office

== See also ==
- List of railway stations in Japan
