= Hosoya Station (Gunma) =

Railway station in Ōta, Gunma Prefecture, Japan

TI19 Hosoya Station 細谷駅
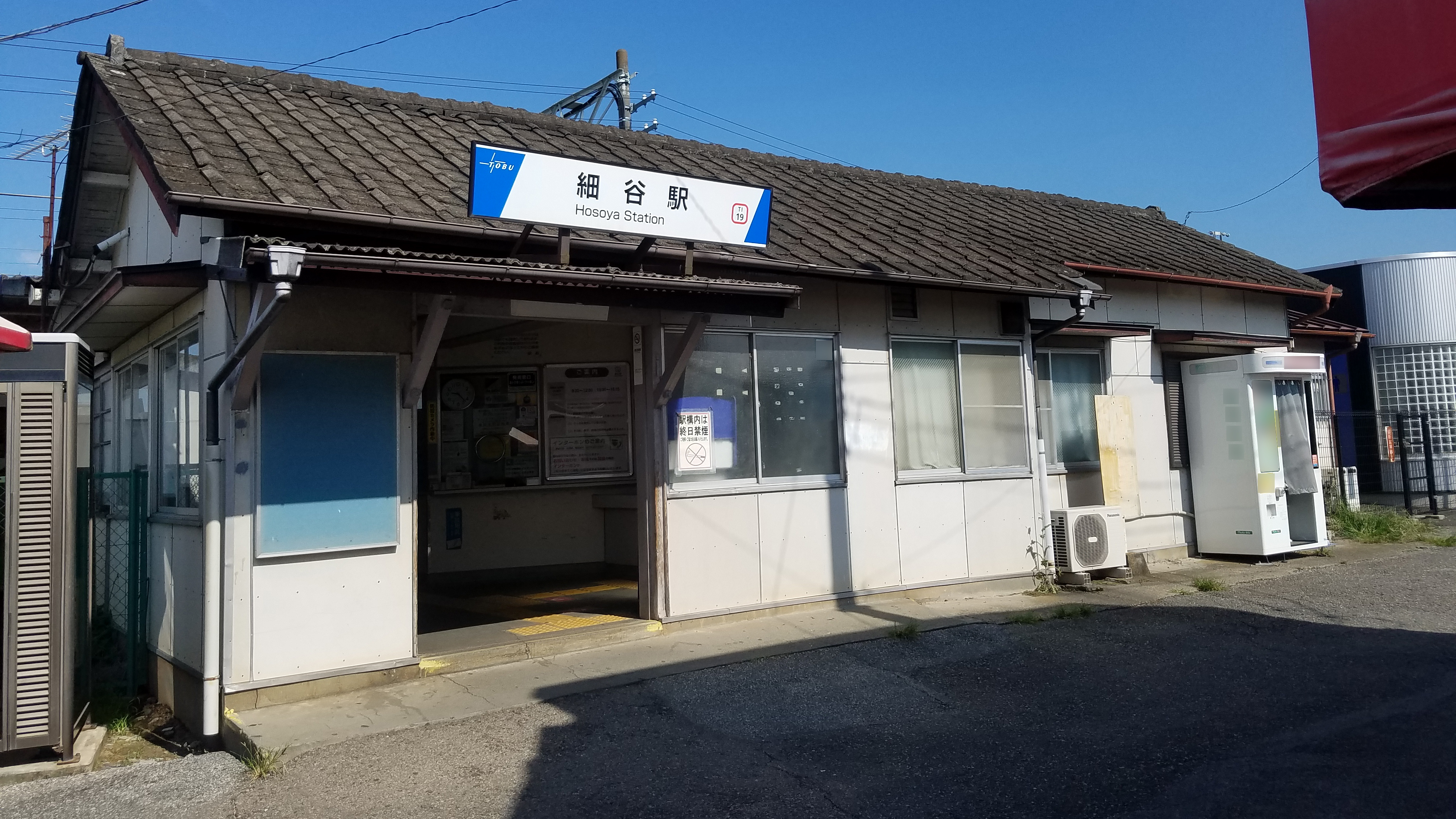
- Hosoya Station in September 2021

General information
- Location: 1169-4 Hosoya-cho, Ōta-shi, Gunma-ken 373-0842; Japan
- Coordinates: 36°16′57″N 139°20′55″E
- Operator: Tōbu Railway
- Line: Tōbu Isesaki Line
- Distance: 97.8 km from Asakusa
- Platforms: 1 island platform

Other information
- Station code: TI-19
- Website: Official website

History
- Opened: 1 October 1927

Passengers
- FY2019: 2710 daily

Services
Preceding station	Tobu Railway	Following station
Ōta TI18 towards Tōbu-Dōbutsu-Kōen	Isesaki Line Local	Kizaki TI20 towards Isesaki
Location
- Location within Gunma Prefecture Location within Japan

Hosoya Station (細谷駅, Hosoya-eki) is a passenger railway station in the city of Ōta, Gunma, Japan, operated by the private railway operator Tōbu Railway.

== Lines ==
Hosoya Station is served by the Tōbu Isesaki Line, and is located 97.8 kilometers from the terminus of the line at Asakusa in Tokyo.

== Station layout ==
The station consists of a single island platform, connected to the station building by an underground passageway.

=== Platforms ===
1	■ Tōbu Isesaki Line	for Isesaki
2	■ Tōbu Isesaki Line	for Ōta

== History ==
The station opened on 1 October 1927.

From 17 March 2012, station numbering was introduced on all Tobu lines, with Hosoya Station becoming "TI-19".

== Passenger statistics ==
In fiscal 2019, the station was used by an average of 2710 passengers daily (boarding passengers only).

== Surrounding area ==
- Kanto Gakuen University
- Hoizumi Post Office
