= Serada Station =

Railway station in Ōta, Gunma Prefecture, Japan

TI21 Serada Station 世良田駅
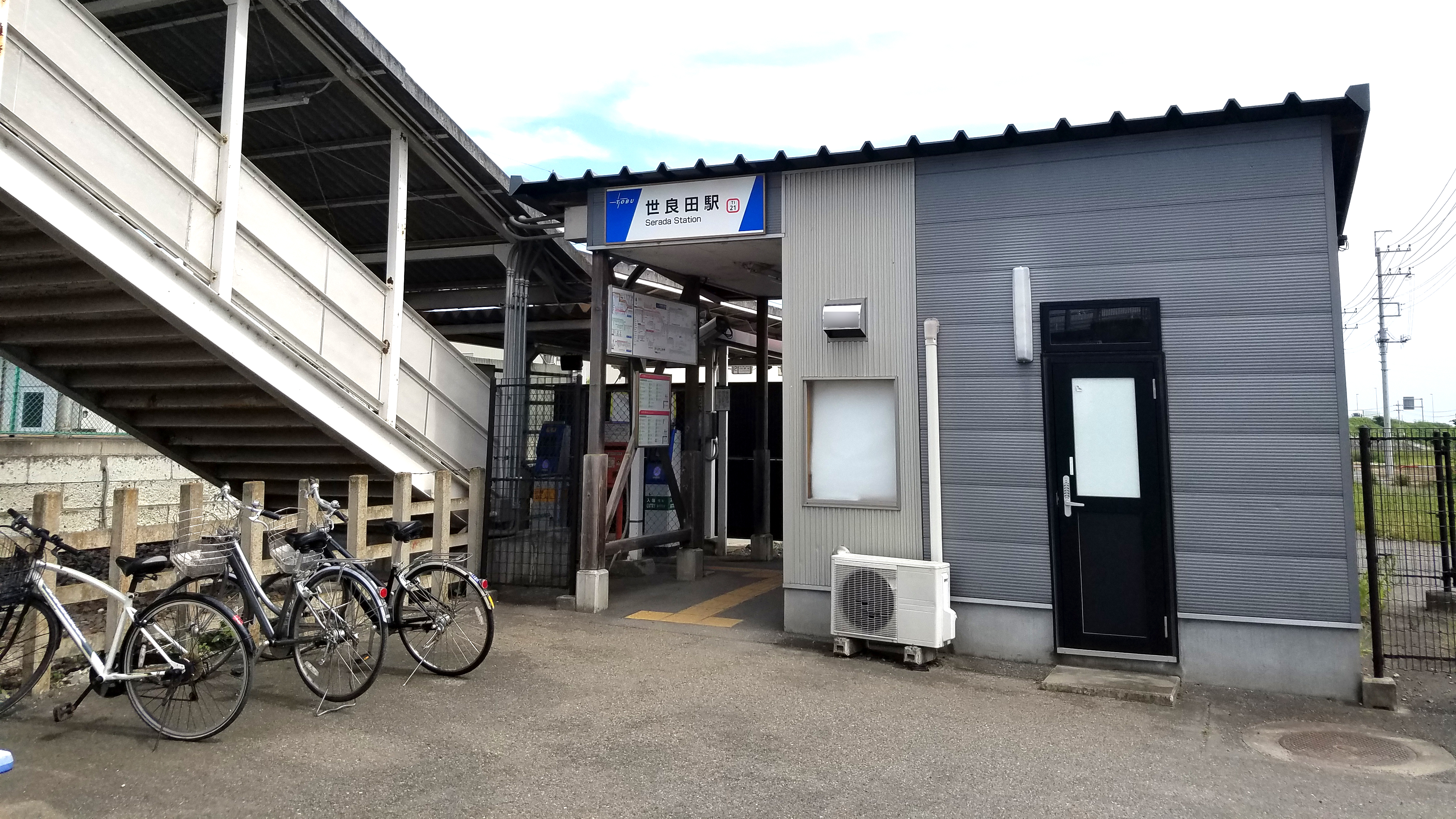
- Serada Station in September 2021

General information
- Location: 2415-1 Serada-chō, Ōta-shi, Gunma-ken 370-0426; Japan
- Coordinates: 36.2729°N 139.2819°E
- Operator: Tōbu Railway
- Line: Tōbu Isesaki Line
- Distance: 104.1 km from Asakusa
- Platforms: 1 island platform

Other information
- Station code: TI-21
- Website: Official website

History
- Opened: 1 October 1927

Passengers
- FY2019: 464 daily

Services
Preceding station	Tobu Railway	Following station
Kizaki TI20 towards Tōbu-Dōbutsu-Kōen	Isesaki Line Local	Sakaimachi TI22 towards Isesaki
Location
- Location within Gunma Prefecture Location within Japan

Serada Station (世良田駅, Serada-eki) is a passenger railway station in the city of Ōta, Gunma, Japan, operated by the private railway operator Tōbu Railway.

== Lines ==
Serada Station is served by the Tōbu Isesaki Line, and is located 104.1 kilometers from the terminus of the line at Asakusa in Tokyo.

== Station layout ==
The station is unstaffed and consists of a single island platform, connected to the station building by a footbridge.

=== Platforms ===
1	■ Tōbu Isesaki Line	for Ōta
2	■ Tōbu Isesaki Line	for Isesaki

== History ==
Serada Station opened on 1 October 1927.

From 17 March 2012, station numbering was introduced on all Tōbu lines, with Serada Station becoming "TI-21".

== Passenger statistics ==
In fiscal 2019, the station was used by an average of 464 passengers daily (boarding passengers only).

== Surrounding area ==
- Former Ojima town hall
- Serada Toshogu
- Serada Post Office
