= Shin-Isesaki Station =

Railway station in Isesaki, Gunma Prefecture, Japan

TI24 Shin-Isesaki Station 新伊勢崎駅
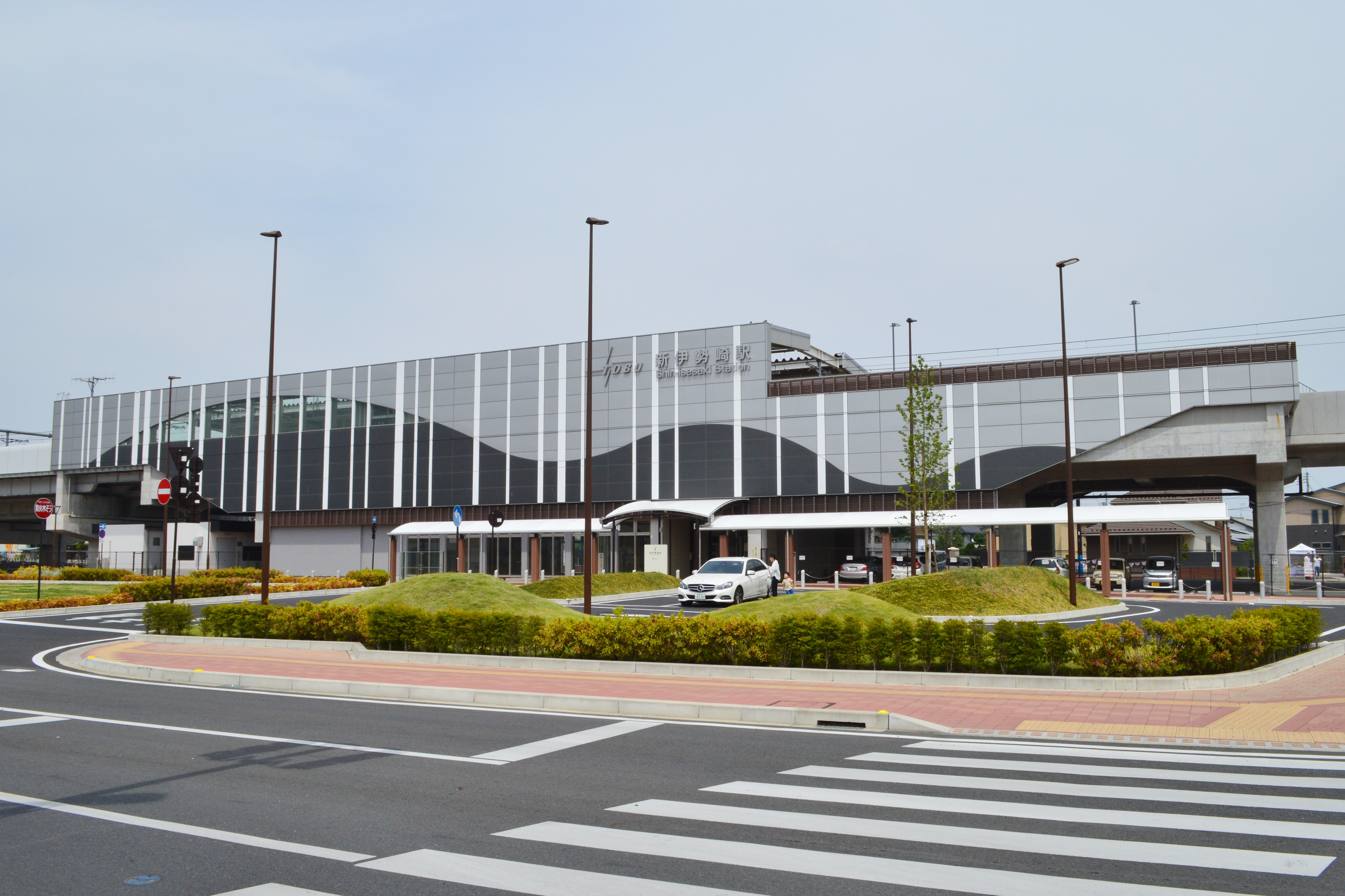
- Shin-Isesaki Station in 2018

General information
- Location: 15-3 Chūō-chō, Isesaki-shi, Gunma-ken 372-0042; Japan
- Coordinates: 36°19′7.11″N 139°12′5.26″E
- Operator: Tōbu Railway
- Line: Tobu Isesaki Line
- Distance: 113.3 km from Asakusa
- Platforms: 2 side platforms
- Tracks: 2

Other information
- Station code: TI-24
- Website: Official website

History
- Opened: 27 March 1910
- Rebuilt: 2013

Passengers
- FY2019: 1310 daily

Services
Preceding station	Tobu Railway	Following station
Sakaimachi TI22 towards Asakusa	Ryomo	Isesaki TI25 Terminus
Gōshi TI23 towards Tōbu-Dōbutsu-Kōen	Isesaki Line Local	Isesaki TI25 Terminus
Location
- Location within Gunma Prefecture Location within Japan

Shin-Isesaki Station (新伊勢崎駅, Shin-Isesaki-eki) is a passenger railway station in the city of Isesaki, Gunma, Japan, operated by the private railway operator Tōbu Railway.

== Lines ==
Shin-Isesaki Station is served by the Tōbu Isesaki Line, and is located 113.3 kilometers from the terminus of the line at Asakusa in Tokyo.

== Station layout ==
Shin-Isesaki Station has two elevated side platforms, with the station building underneath.

=== Platforms ===
1	■ Tōbu Isesaki Line	for Isesaki
2	■ Tōbu Isesaki Line	for Ōta, Ashikaga, and Tatebayashi

== History ==
The station opened on 27 March 1910.

From 17 March 2012, station numbering was introduced on all Tōbu lines, with Shin-Isesaki Station becoming "TI-24".

New elevated platforms and a new station building were brought into use from 19 October 2013.

== Surrounding area ==
- Isesaki City Hall
- Isesaki Chuo Post Office

== Passenger statistics ==
In fiscal 2019, the station was used by an average of 1310 passengers daily (boarding passengers only).

== See also ==
- List of railway stations in Japan
