= Gōshi Station =

Railway station in Isesaki, Gunma Prefecture, Japan

TI23 Gōshi Station 剛志駅
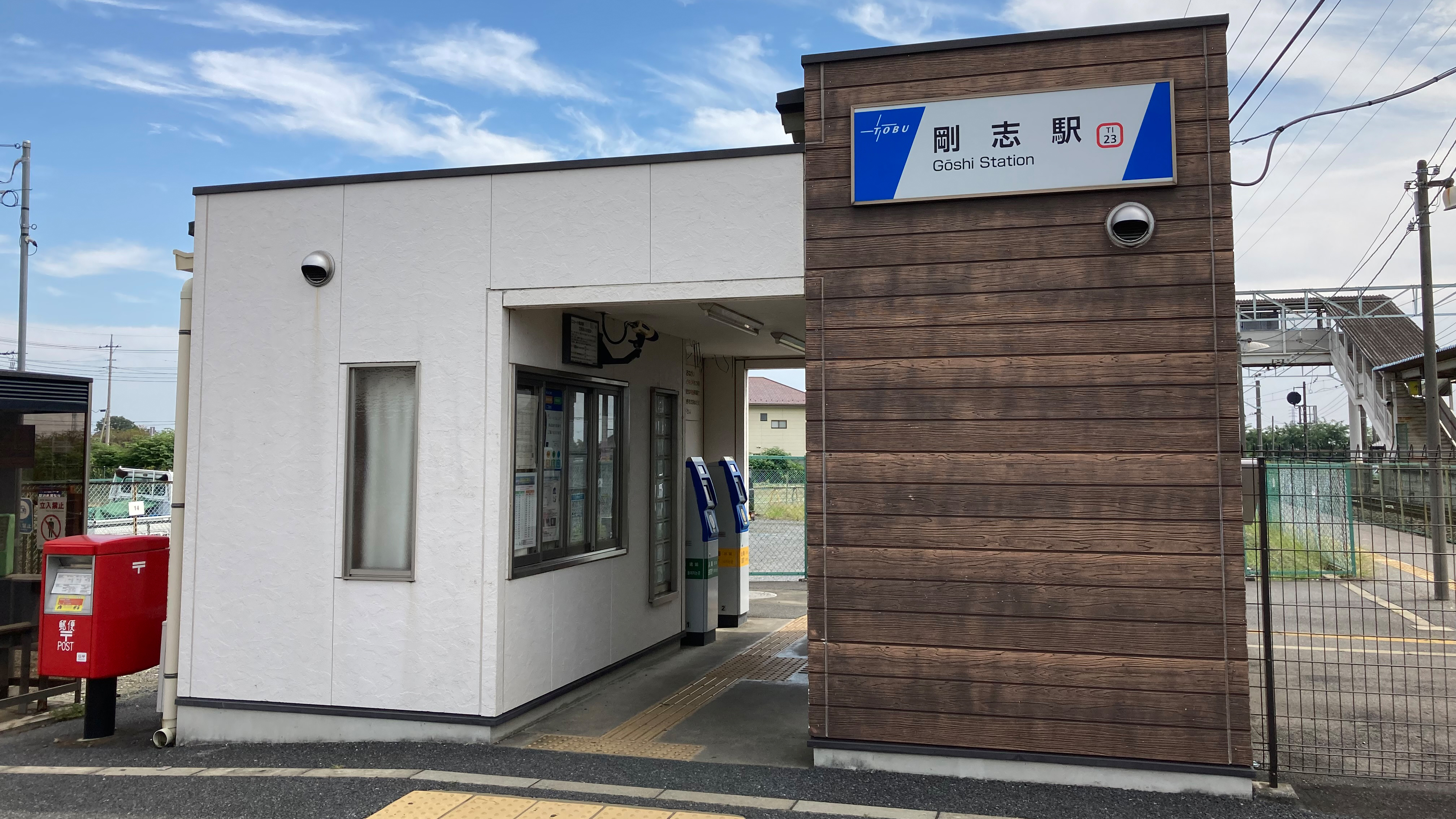
- Gōshi Station in September 2021

General information
- Location: 1164-4 Sakaihozumi, Isesaki-shi, Gunma-ken 370-0128; Japan
- Coordinates: 36.2954°N 139.2239°E
- Operator: Tōbu Railway
- Line: Tōbu Isesaki Line
- Distance: 110.0 km from Asakusa
- Platforms: 1 island platform

Other information
- Station code: TI-23
- Website: Official website

History
- Opened: 27 March 1910

Passengers
- FY2019: 1575 daily

Services
Preceding station	Tobu Railway	Following station
Sakaimachi TI22 towards Tōbu-Dōbutsu-Kōen	Isesaki Line Local	Shin-Isesaki TI24 towards Isesaki
Location
- Location within Gunma Prefecture Location within Japan

Gōshi Station (剛志駅, Gōshi-eki) is a passenger railway station in the city of Isesaki, Gunma, Japan, operated by the private railway operator Tōbu Railway.

== Lines ==
Gōshi Station is served by the Tōbu Isesaki Line, and is located 110.0 kilometers from the terminus of the line at Asakusa in Tokyo.

== Station layout ==
The station is unstaffed and consists of a single island platform, connected to the station building by a footbridge.

=== Platforms ===
1	■ Tōbu Isesaki Line	for Isesaki
2	■ Tōbu Isesaki Line	for Ōta, Ashikaga, and Tatebayashi

== History ==
Gōshi Station opened on 27 March 1910.

From 17 March 2012, station numbering was introduced on all Tōbu lines, with Gōshi Station becoming "TI-23".

== Passenger statistics ==
In fiscal 2019, the station was used by an average of 1575 passengers daily (boarding passengers only).

== Surrounding area ==
- Isesaki High School
