= Tobu Isesaki Line =

Railway line in Japan

Isesaki Line

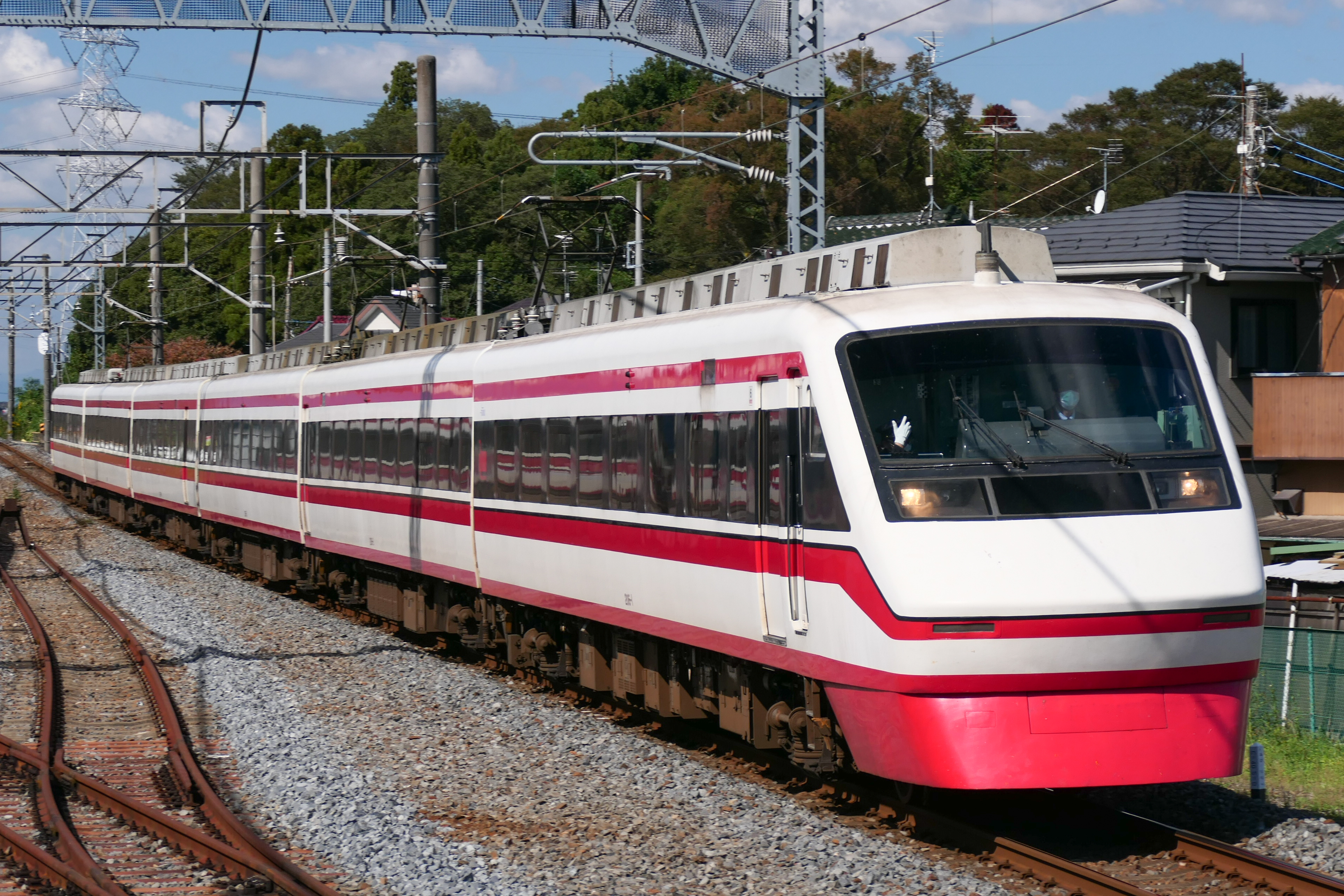
- Tobu Railway 200 series

Overview
- Native name: 伊勢崎線
- Status: In service
- Owner: Tobu Railway Co., Ltd.
- Locale: Kantō
- Termini: Tōbu-Dōbutsu-Kōen; Isesaki
- Stations: 26
- Website: https://www.tobu.co.jp/en/

Service
- Type: Commuter rail
- System: Tobu Railway
- Route number: TI
- Operator(s): Tobu Railway Co., Ltd.
- Depot: Tatebayashi
- Daily ridership: 843,495 (2010)

History
- Opened: 27 August 1899; 127 years ago

Technical
- Line length: 73.5 km (45.7 mi)
- Track gauge: 1,067 mm (3 ft 6 in)
- Electrification: 1,500 V DC
- Operating speed: 110 km/h (68 mph)

The Isesaki Line (伊勢崎線, Isesaki-sen) is a Japanese railway line operated by the private railway company Tobu Railway, extending from Tōbu-Dōbutsu-Kōen Station in Saitama to Isesaki Station in Gunma Prefecture. The Isesaki Line can refer to the entire section between Asakusa - Isesaki and Oshiage - Hikifune, but from March 2012, the 41.0 km (25.5 mi) section south of Tōbu-Dōbutsu-Kōen was branded as the Tobu Skytree Line in conjunction with the opening of the Tokyo Skytree tower.

== Descriptions ==
Track
single: Tatebayashi − Isesaki 39.9 km (24.8 mi)
double: the rest

== Operation ==
=== Service patterns ===
Stops and operated sections are as of February 15, 2023.

Local (普通, Futsū) (announced as Kakueki Teisha (各駅停車) or kakutei (各停) for short) (L)
- Tōbu-Dōbutsu-Kōen − Ōta. Connection with Express. Three per hour, with one between Kuki and Tatebayashi.
- Ōta − Isesaki. One per hour per direction, conductorless.
Section Semi-Express (区間準急, Kukan Junkyū) (SSE)
Between Asakusa and Tōbu-Dōbutsu Kōen, Kuki or Minami-Kurihashi on Nikkō Line.
Semi-Express (準急, Junkyū) (SmE)
Early morning and late night. Down to Tōbu-Dōbutsu-Kōen, Kuki or to Minami-Kurihashi on the Nikkō Line through from Chūō-Rinkan of Tokyu Den-en-toshi Line via Hanzōmon Line. 10 cars.
Section Express (区間急行, Kukan Kyūkō) (SE)
Between Asakusa and Tōbu-Dōbutsu-Kōen, Tatebayashi or Ōta.
Express (急行, Kyūkō) (Ex)
From morning to night. Down to Tōbu-Dōbutsu-Kōen, Kuki (nearly half to Minami-Kurihashi on the Nikkō Line), through from Chūō-Rinkan on the Tokyu Den-en-toshi Line via Hanzōmon Line. 10 cars.
Limited Express (特急, Tokkyū) (LE)
Stops not shown for now. Charged for seat reservation and rapid service. Mainly through to the Nikkō Line for the Nikko area named Kegon (けごん) and Kinu (きぬ). Some through to Isesaki from Asakusa, sole direct service named Ryōmō (りょうもう). The 70090 Series Services runs through to Ebisu from Kuki, Home liner service named TH Liner.

== Stations ==
- O: Stop
- *1: To/from Asakusa on the Tobu Skytree Line section of the Isesaki Line.
- *2: To/from Chūō-Rinkan on Tokyu Den-en-toshi Line via Tokyo Metro Hanzomon Line
- For the section between Tōbu-Dōbutsu-Kōen and Asakusa, see Tobu Skytree Line.

No.	Station		L	SSE	SmE	SE	Ex	Transfers	Location	
TS30	Tōbu-Dōbutsu-Kōen	東武動物公園	O	O *1	O *2	O *1	O *2	Tobu Skytree Line (TS30; through to/from Asakusa); Nikkō Line (TS30)	Miyashiro	Saitama
TI01	Wado	和戸	O	O	O	O	O		Miyashiro	Saitama
TI02	Kuki	久喜	O	O	O	O	O	■ Utsunomiya Line	Kuki	Saitama
TI03	Washinomiya	鷲宮	O	O		O			Kuki	Saitama
TI04	Hanasaki	花崎	O	O		O			Kazo	Saitama
TI05	Kazo	加須	O	O		O			Kazo	Saitama
TI06	Minami-Hanyū	南羽生	O	O		O			Hanyū	Saitama
TI07	Hanyū	羽生	O	O		O		Chichibu Main Line (CR01)	Hanyū	Saitama
TI08	Kawamata	川俣	O	O		O			Meiwa	Gunma
TI09	Morinji-mae	茂林寺前	O	O		O			Tatebayashi	Gunma
TI10	Tatebayashi	館林	O	O		O		Sano Line (TI10); Koizumi Line (TI10)	Tatebayashi	Gunma
TI11	Tatara	多々良	O						Tatebayashi	Gunma
TI12	Agata	県	O						Ashikaga	Tochigi
TI13	Fukui	福居	O						Ashikaga	Tochigi
TI14	Tōbu-Izumi	東武和泉	O						Ashikaga	Tochigi
TI15	Ashikagashi	足利市	O						Ashikaga	Tochigi
TI16	Yashū-yamabe	野州山辺	O						Ashikaga	Tochigi
TI17	Niragawa	韮川	O						Ōta	Gunma
TI18	Ōta	太田	O					Kiryū Line (TI18); Koizumi Line (TI18)	Ōta	Gunma
TI19	Hosoya	細谷	O						Ōta	Gunma
TI20	Kizaki	木崎	O						Ōta	Gunma
TI21	Serada	世良田	O						Ōta	Gunma
TI22	Sakaimachi	境町	O						Isesaki	Gunma
TI23	Gōshi	剛志	O						Isesaki	Gunma
TI24	Shin-Isesaki	新伊勢崎	O						Isesaki	Gunma
TI25	Isesaki	伊勢崎	O					■ Ryōmō Line	Isesaki	Gunma

== Rolling stock ==
=== Current ===
- Tobu 200 series
- Tobu 500 series
- Tobu 10000 series
- Tobu 50000 series
- Tobu 50050 series
- Tobu 70090 series (TH Liner)
- Tokyu 2020 series
- Tokyu 5000 series
- Tokyo Metro 18000 series
- Tokyo Metro 8000 series
- Tokyo Metro 08 series
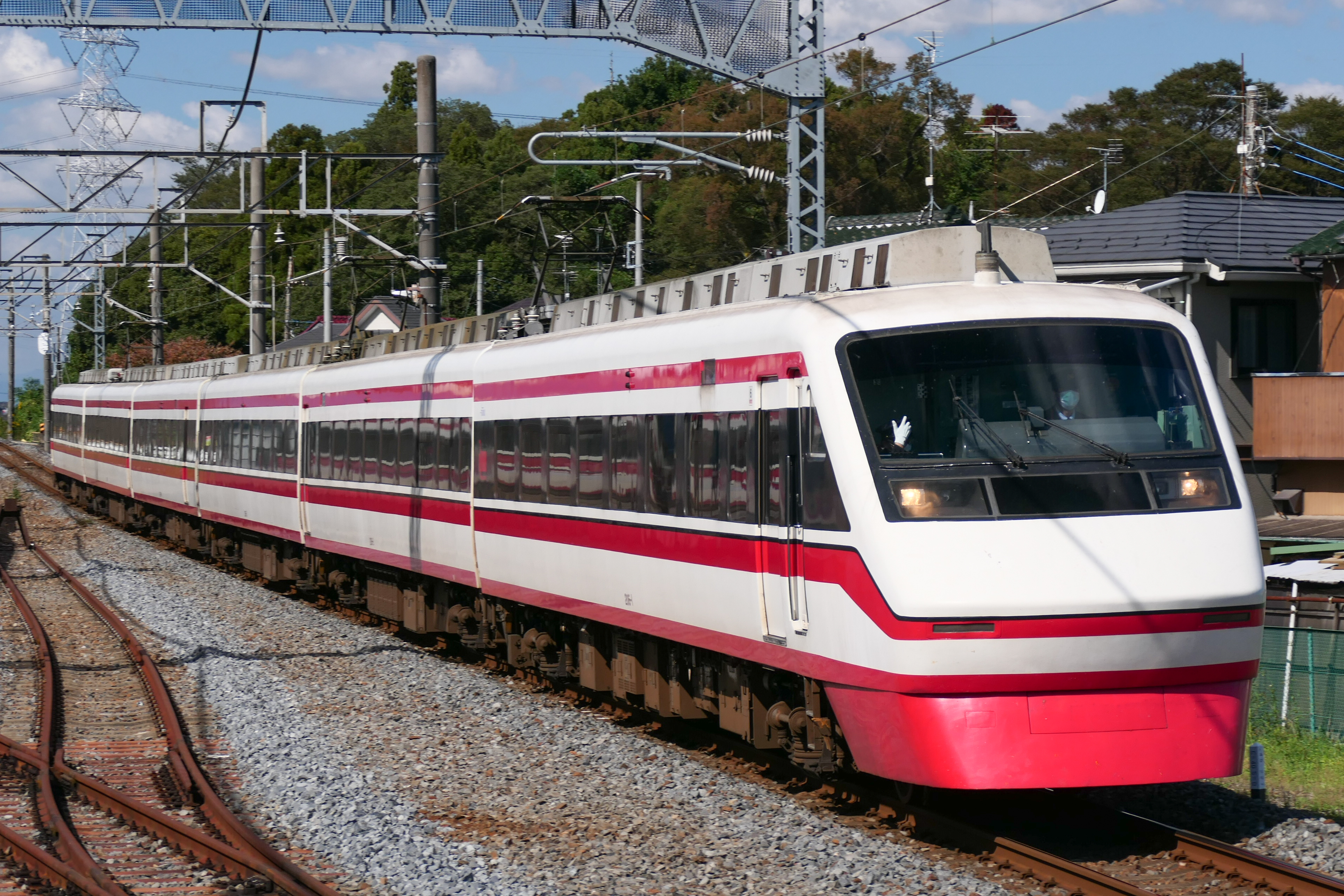
Tobu 200 series

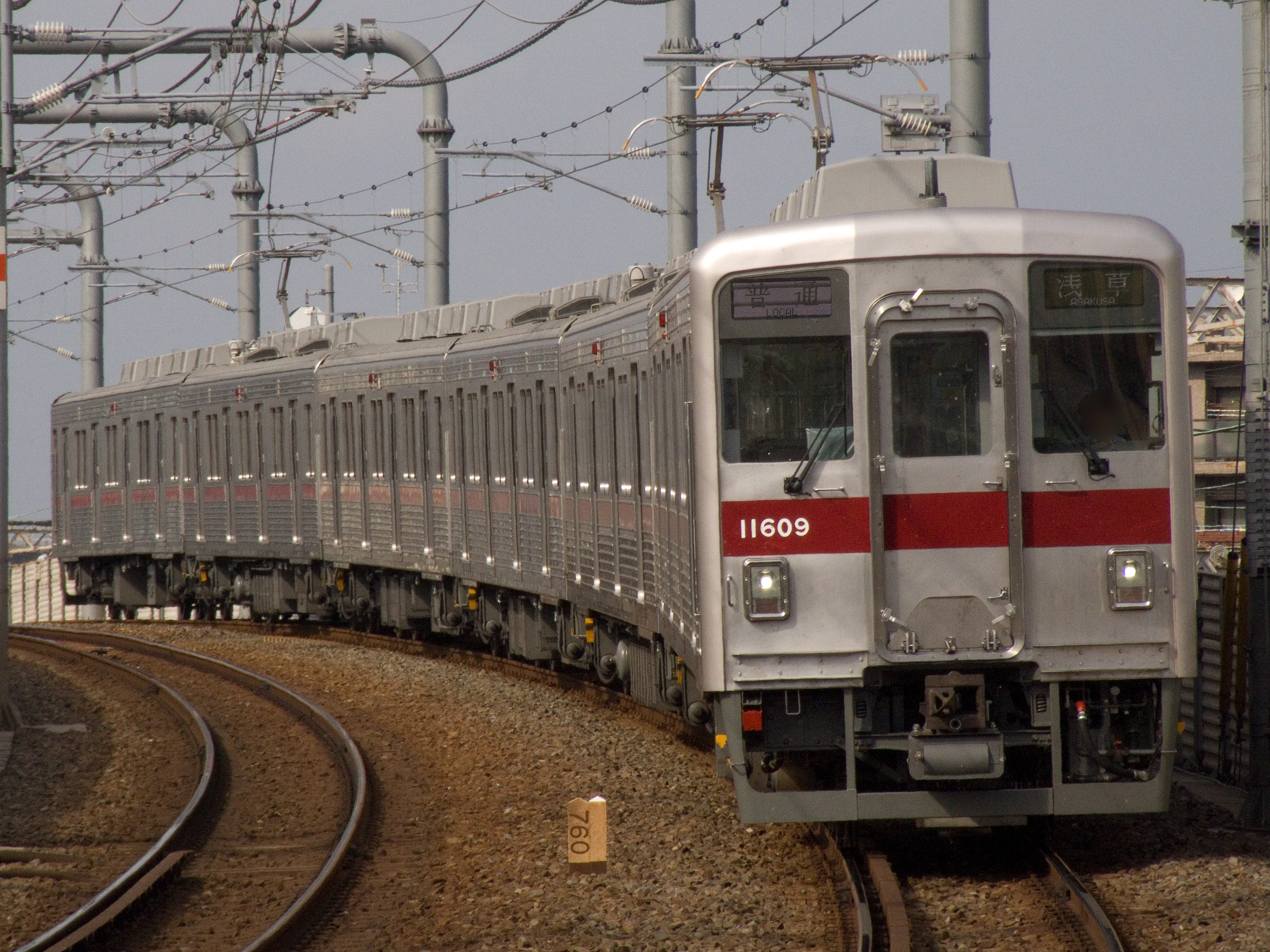
Tobu 10000 series

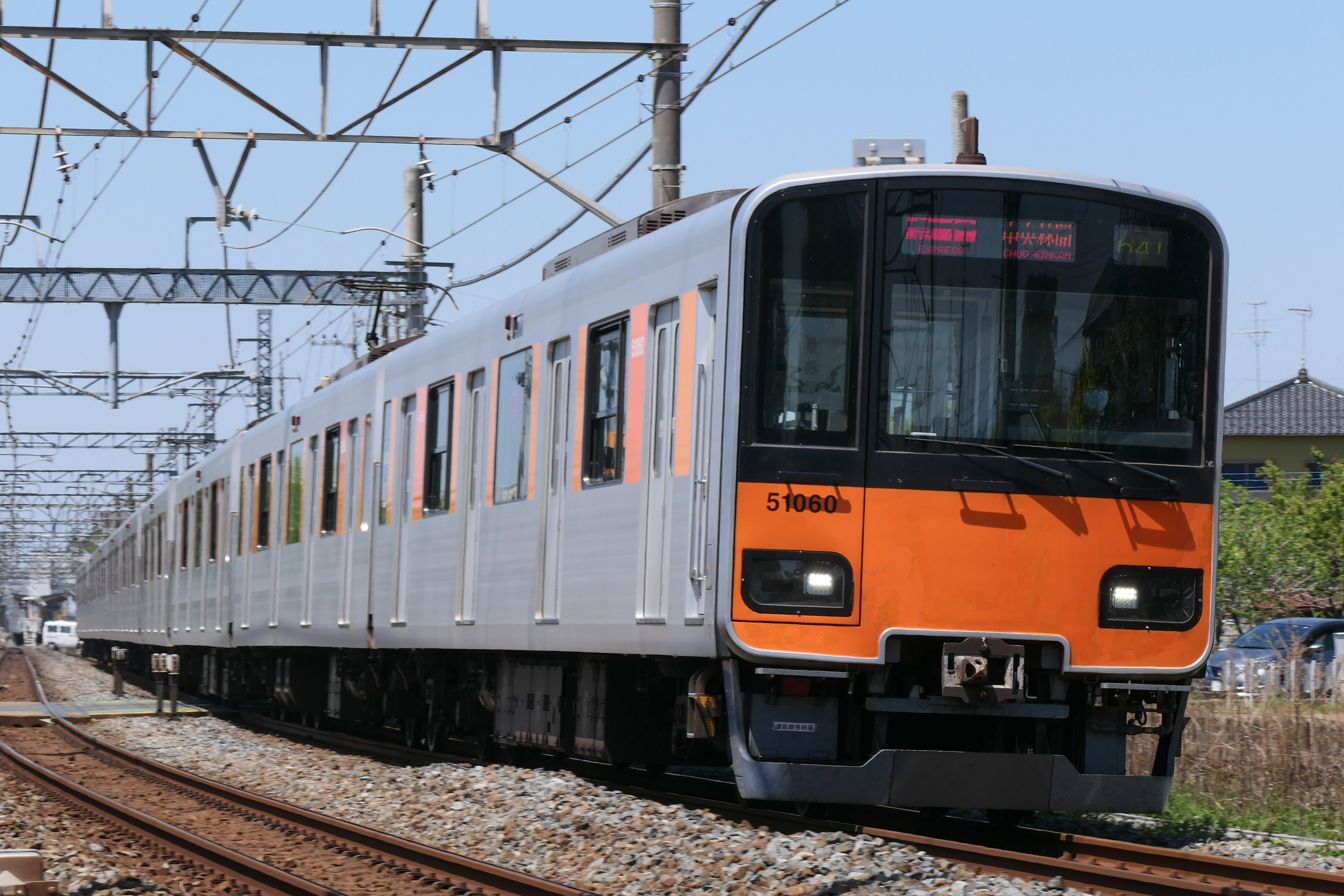
Tobu 50050 series

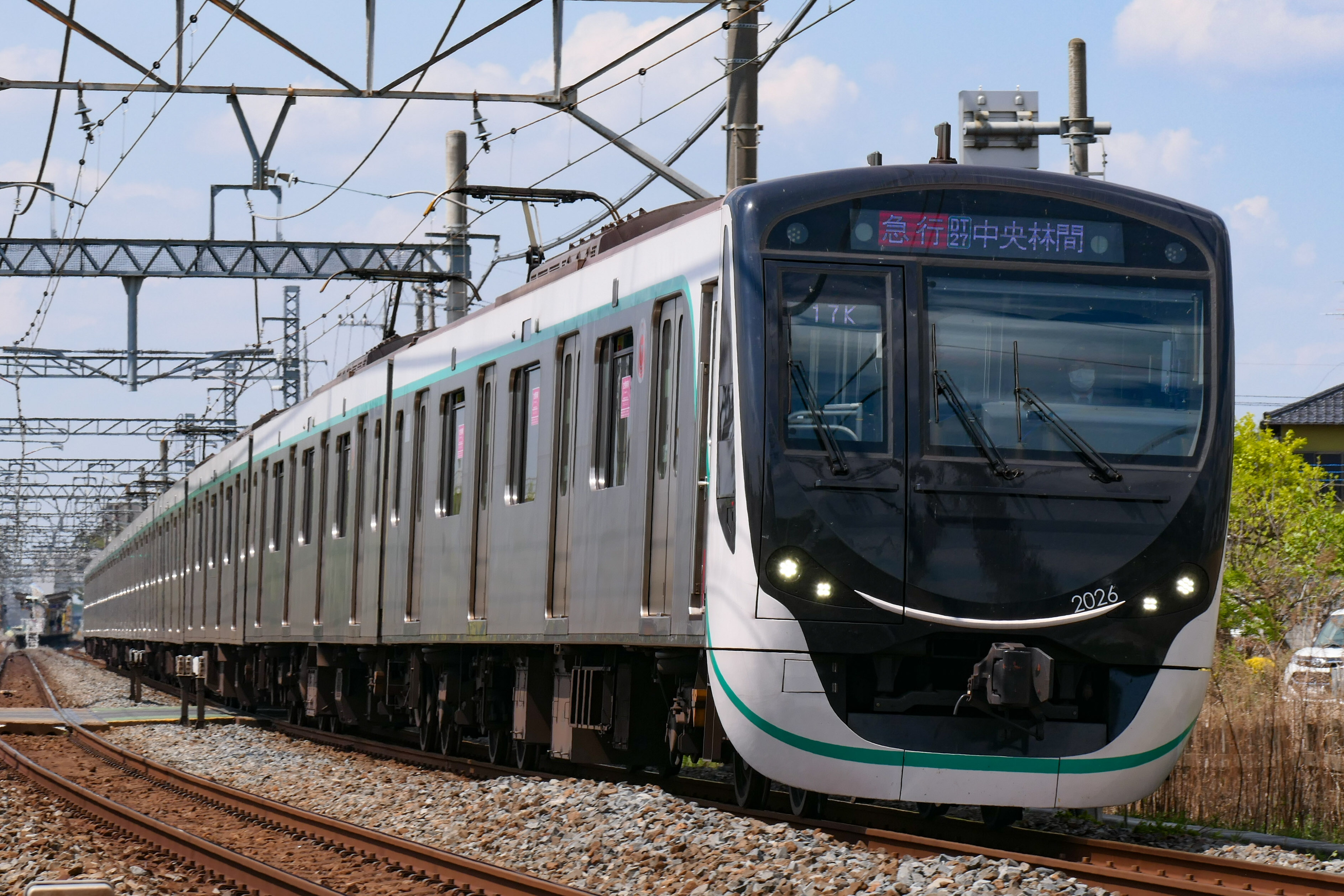
Tokyu 2020 series

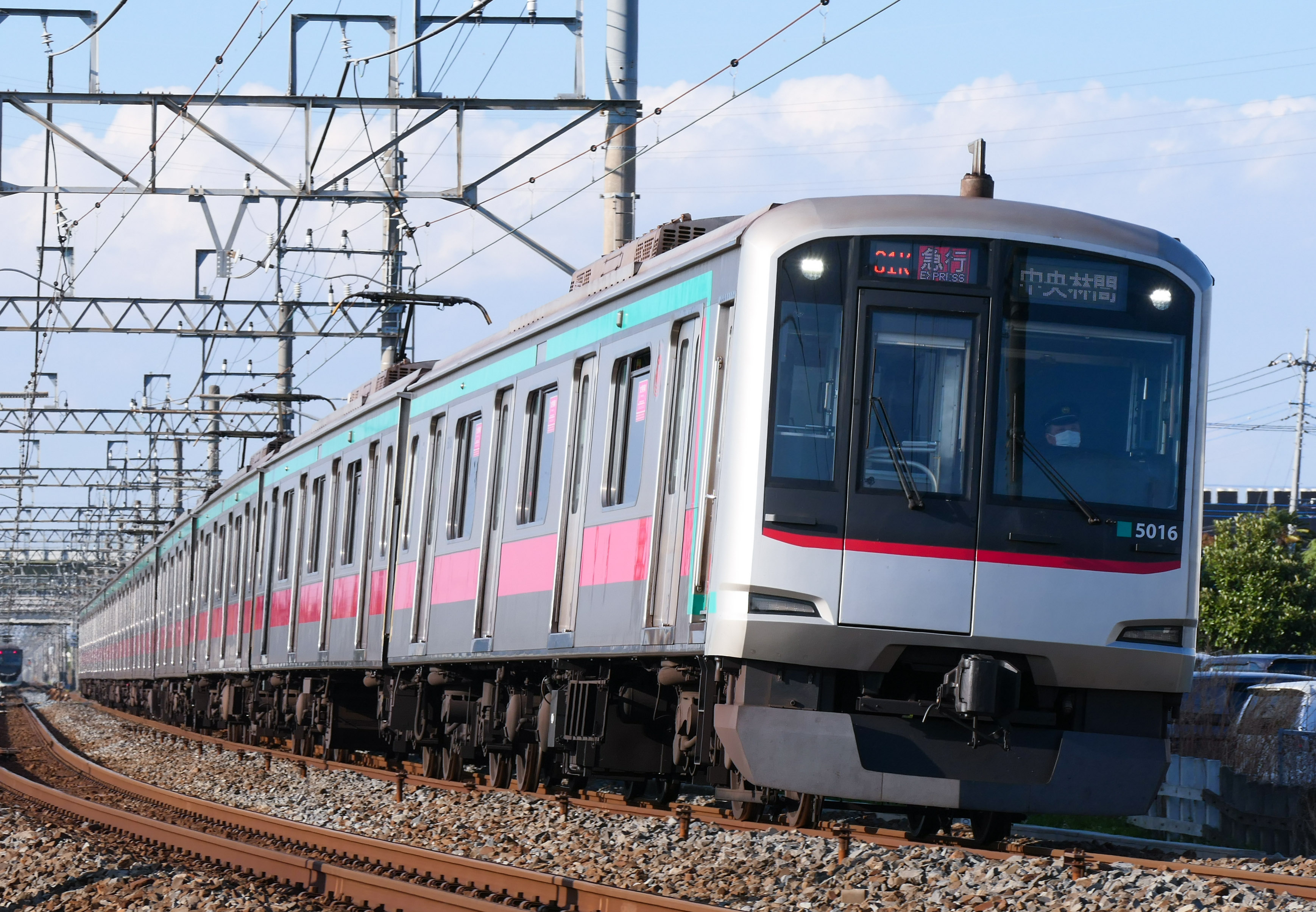
Tokyu 5000 series

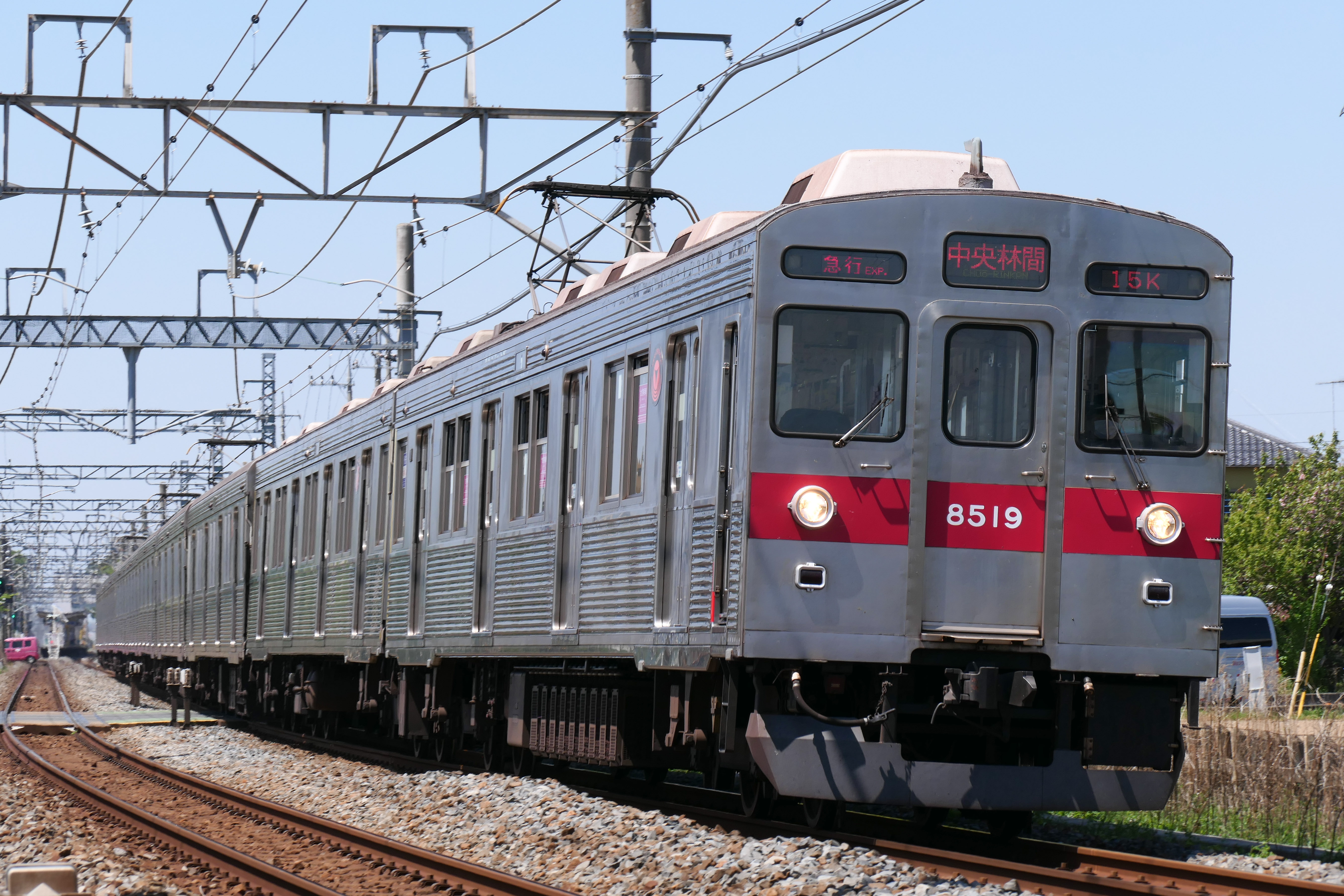
Tokyu 8500 series

Tokyo Metro 8000 series

=== Former ===
- Tokyu 8500 series (1975-2023)
- Tobu 30000 series

== History ==
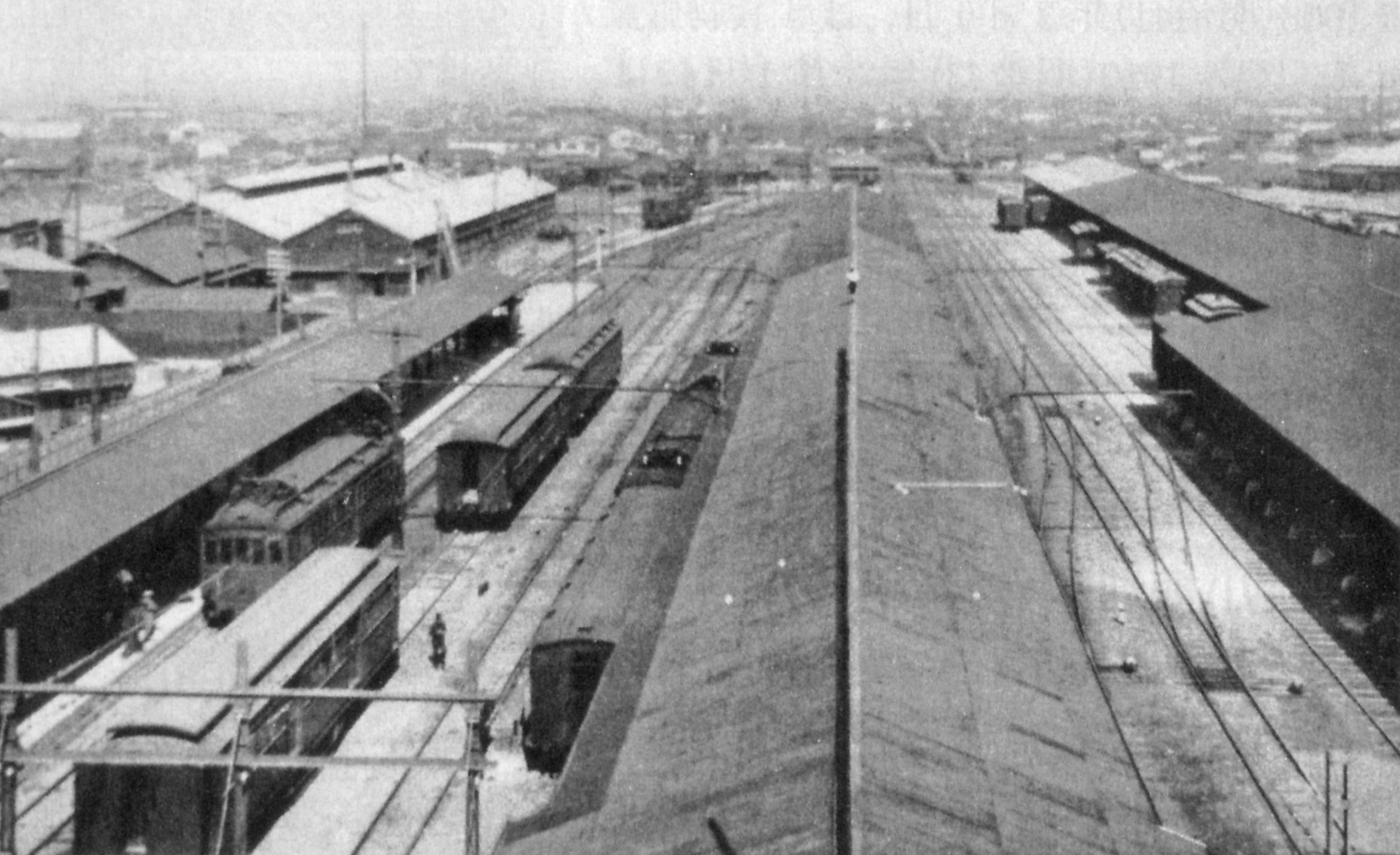
Overview of the original Asakusa Station terminus (present-day Tokyo Skytree Station) in 1927

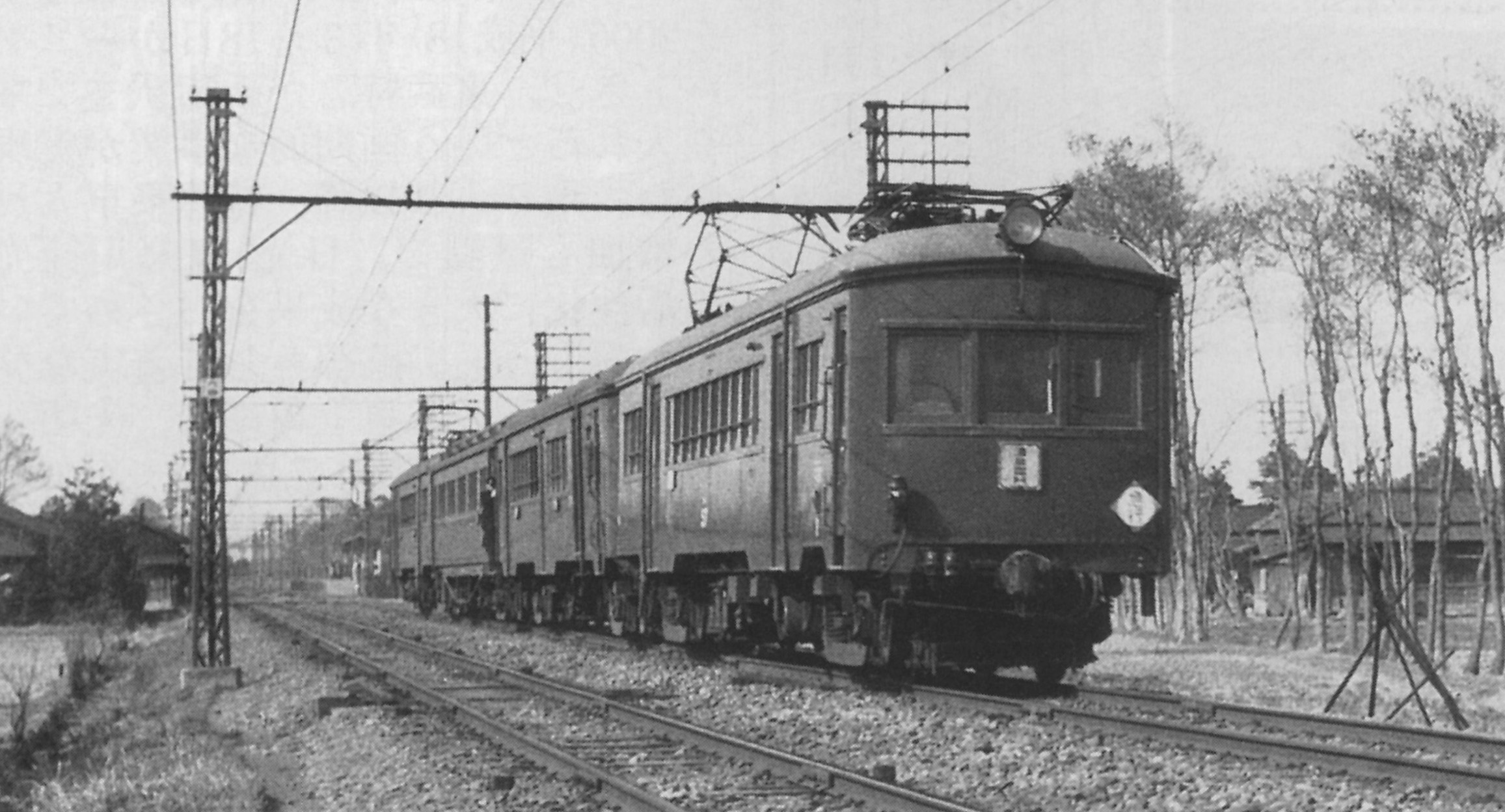
An up express service on the Tobu Isesaki Line formed of a 4-car EMU in March 1940

The first section of the Isesaki Line was opened by the present company on 27 August 1899 between Kita-Senju and Kuki utilising steam motive power. On 1 April 1902, Tobu extended the line south to have a maritime connection at present Tokyo Skytree (then Azumabashi (吾妻橋), later renamed Asakusa) in downtown Tokyo, and north to Kazo. The following year a further northern extension to Kawamata (then on the south bank of Tone River) was opened. Further northward extension progressed, and in 1910 the line arrived at Isesaki. In 1931, a bridge over the Sumida River was built and present Asakusa Station (then Asakusa-Narihirabashi) opened as part of the department store building, the entire line being completed.

The Asakusa to Nishiarai section was double-tracked in 1912, and the rest of the line was double-tracked between 1920 and 1927, except for the Hanyu to Kawamata section, which was double-tracked when a second bridge was built over the Tonegawa in 1992.

Electrification was begun in 1924 on the section of Asakusa and Nishiarai, and in 1927 completed as far as Isesaki. The distance of over 100 km (62 mi) was then one of the longest electrified railway lines together with the present Kintetsu Osaka Line and Yamada Lines.

After World War II, the Tobu Lines had no connection to the Yamanote Line or other major lines of the then Japanese National Railways (JNR) to offer efficient transfers to central Tokyo. The sole connection was with the Jōban Line at Kitasenju, which offered poor access to central Tokyo. To solve the inefficiencies of transfers at Kitasenju and notoriously narrow Asakusa, in 1962, the Hibiya Line of the then Teito Rapid Transport Authority (帝都高速度交通営団, Teito Kōsokudo Kōtsū Eidan), known as TRTA, present Tokyo Metro) was built, connecting at Kitasenju.

Further growing traffic occurred in the 1990s, and in 2003, the company built new tracks from Hikifune to connect at Oshiage, officially an annex station of Tokyo Skytree, and through service began with the Hanzomon Line of the Tokyo Metro.

According to the timetable revision from March 2006, less than half of trains originated or terminated at Asakusa, with more trains operating through to Tokyo Metro subway lines.

From 17 March 2012, the section south of Tōbu-Dōbutsu-Kōen was rebranded as the Tobu Skytree Line.
