= Ashikagashi Station =

Railway station in Ashikaga, Tochigi Prefecture, Japan

TI15 Ashikagashi Station 足利市駅
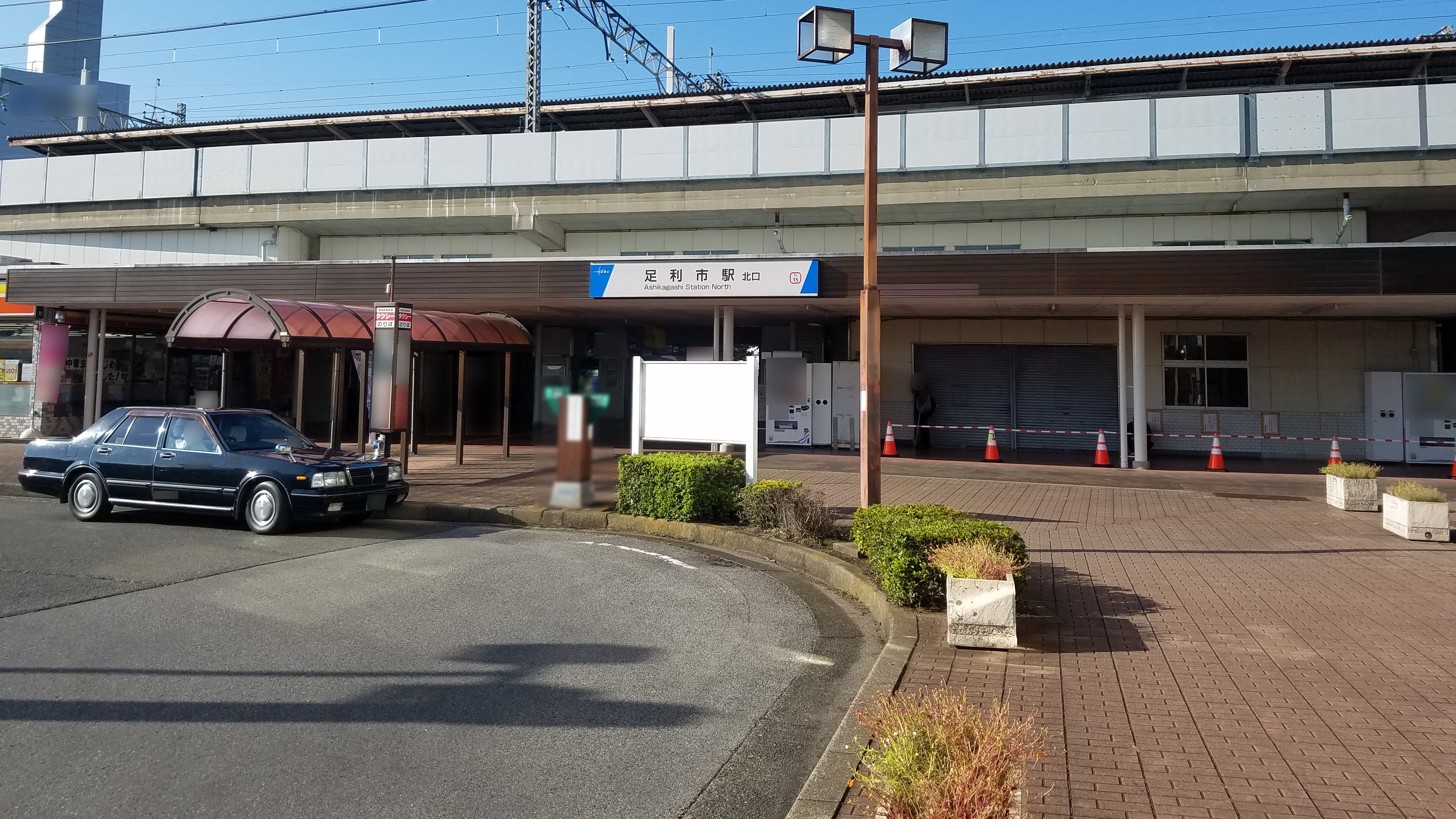
- The north entrance to the Station in September 2021

General information
- Location: 3694 Minami-chō, Ashikaga-shi, Tochigi-ken 326-0821; Japan
- Coordinates: 36.3297°N 139.4486°E
- Operator: Tōbu Railway
- Line: Tōbu Isesaki Line
- Connections: Bus terminal

Other information
- Station code: TI-15

History
- Opened: August 27, 1907
- Former names: Ashikagamachi (until 1924)

Passengers
- FY2020: 6010 daily

Services
Preceding station	Tobu Railway	Following station
Tatebayashi TI10 towards Asakusa	Ryomo	Ōta TI18 towards Akagi or Isesaki
Tōbu-Izumi TI14 towards Tōbu-Dōbutsu-Kōen	Isesaki Line Local	Yashū-Yamabe TI16 towards Isesaki
Location
- Location within Tochigi Prefecture Location within Japan

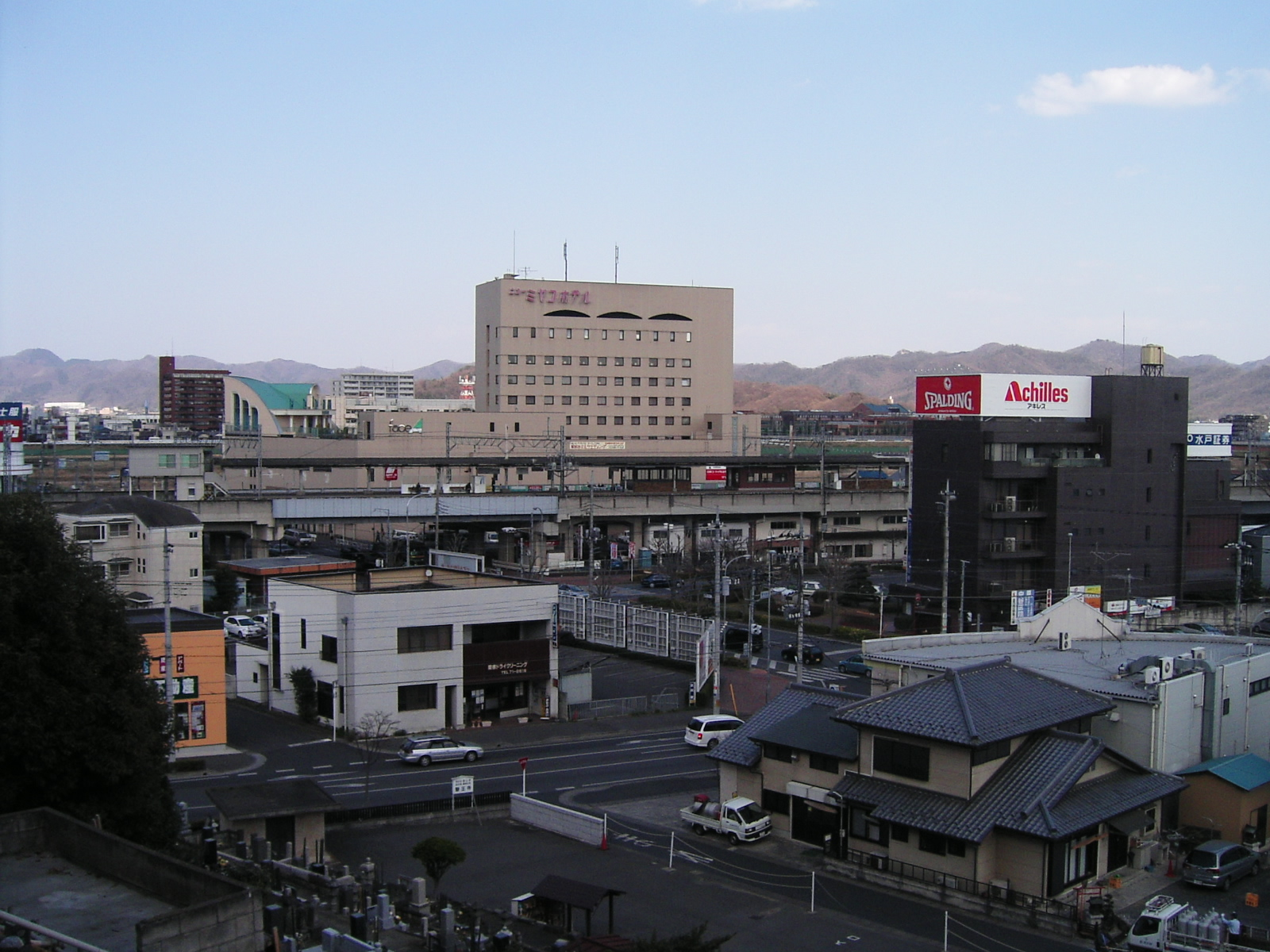
Station from south side

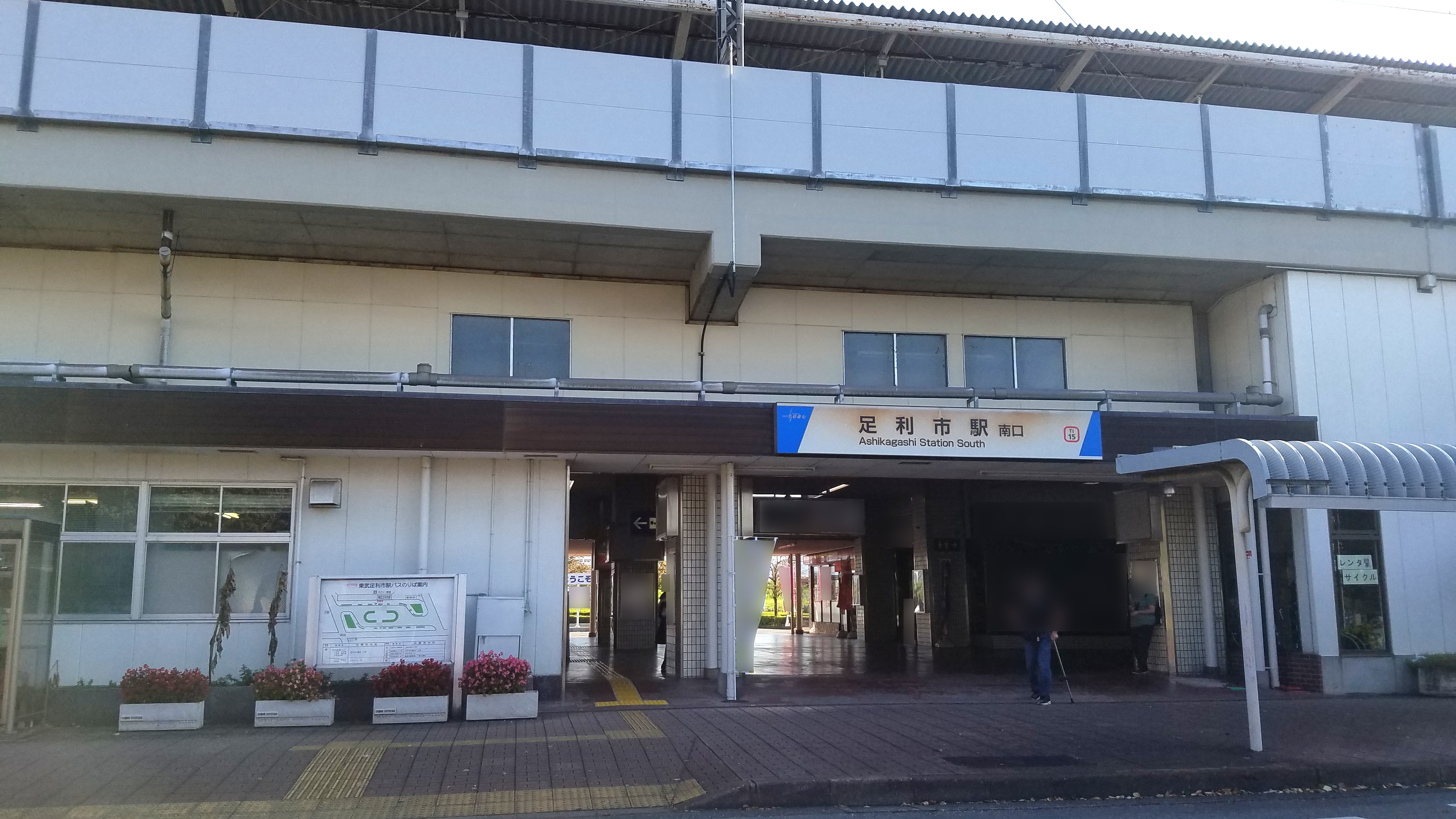
The south entrance to the station in September 2021

Ashikagashi Station (足利市駅, Ashikagashi-eki) is a railway station in the city of Ashikaga, Tochigi, Japan, operated by the private railway operator Tōbu Railway.

== Lines ==
Ashikagashi Station is served by the Tōbu Isesaki Line, and is located 86.8 km from the line's Tokyo terminus at Asakusa.

== Station layout ==
The station consists of an elevated island platform serving two tracks.

=== Platforms ===
1	Tōbu Isesaki Line	for Tatebayashi, Kuki, Tōbu-Dōbutsu-Kōen, Kasukabe, Kita-Senju, and Asakusa
2	Tōbu Isesaki Line	for Ōta, Isesaki, Shin-Kiryū, and Akagi

== History ==
The station first opened on August 27, 1907, as Ashikagamachi Station (足利町駅). It was renamed Ashikagashi Station (足利市駅) on August 25, 1924. The station was rebuilt as an elevated station on July 23, 1980.

From 17 March 2012, station numbering was introduced on all Tōbu lines, with Ashikagashi Station becoming "TI-15".

In July 2015, the station and Ashikaga Station adopted Chisato Moritaka's 1993 song "Watarasebashi" as their train melody, as the song pays homage to the town of Ashikaga.

== Passenger statistics ==
In fiscal 2019, the station was used by an average of 6010 passengers daily (boarding passengers only).

== Bus services ==
South Entrance

There are direct express bus services for Narita Airport, Haneda Airport, Osaka, Kyoto, Nara, Nara, Nagoya, Kanazawa, Toyama, and Sendai.

== Surrounding area ==
- Ashikaga City Hall
- Ashikaga Post Office
- Ashikaga Red Cross Hospital
- Ashikaga Gakko
- National Route 293
- JR East Ashikaga Station (1 km northeast of the station)
- Orihime Jinja
- Banna-ji
