= Isesaki Station =

Railway station in Isesaki, Gunma Prefecture, Japan

TI25 Isesaki Station 伊勢崎駅
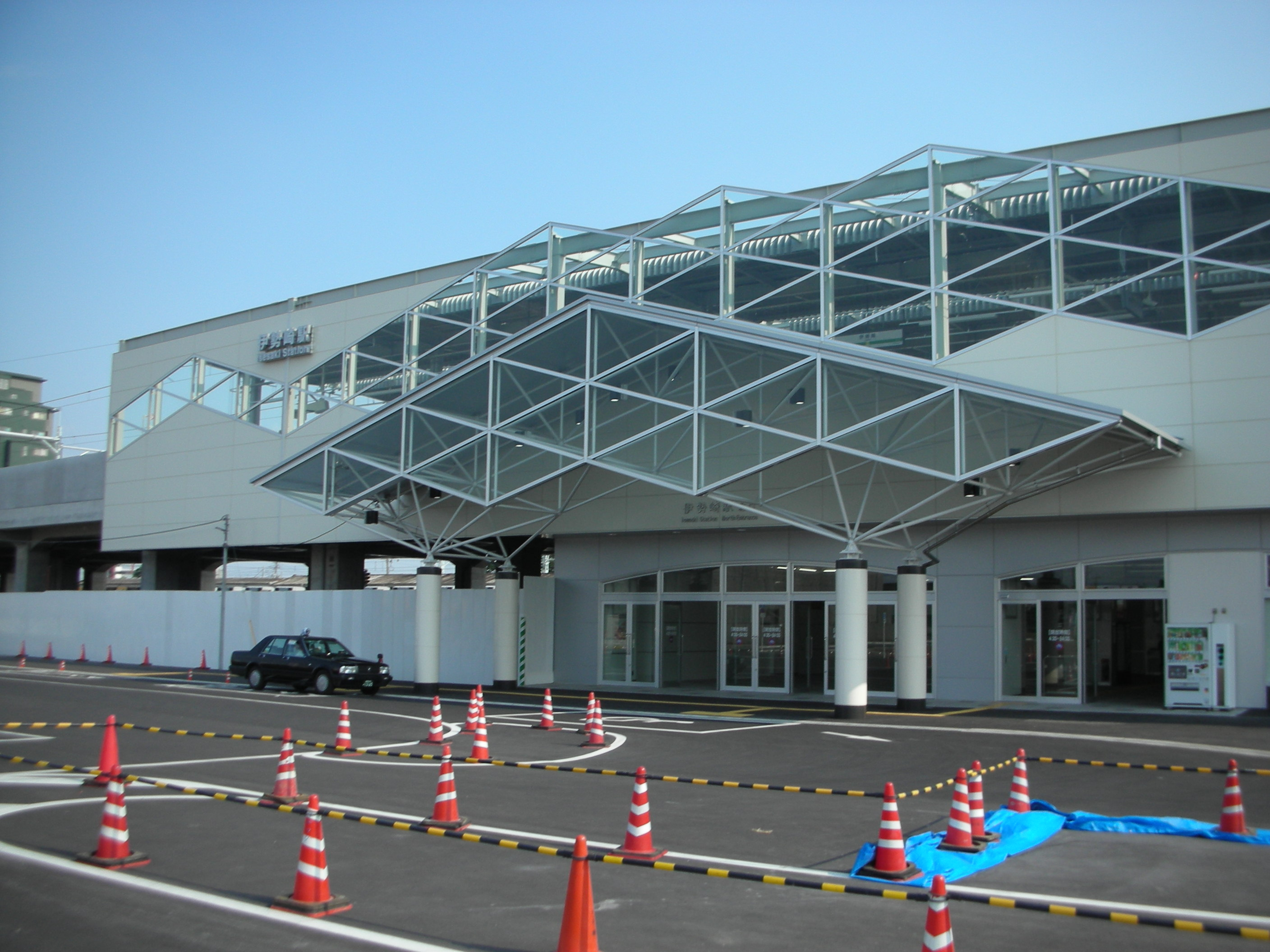
- Isesaki Station, June 2010

General information
- Location: 3-1 Kuruwa-cho, Isesaki-shi, Gunma-ken 372-0055; Japan
- Coordinates: 36°19′37″N 139°11′36″E
- Operator: JR East; Tobu Railway
- Lines: Ryōmō Line; Tobu Isesaki Line
- Distance: 69.1 km (42.9 mi) from Oyama (JR East); 114.5 km (71.1 mi) from Asakusa (Tobu)
- Platforms: 2 island platforms (JR East); 1 island (Tobu)

Other information
- Status: Staffed
- Station code: TN-25 (Tobu)

History
- Opened: 20 November 1889; 136 years ago

Passengers
- FY2021: 4,920 daily (JR East); 5,612 (Tobu)

Services
Preceding station	JR East	Following station
Komagata towards Takasaki	Ryōmō Line	Kunisada towards Oyama
Preceding station	Tobu Railway	Following station
Shin-Isesaki TI24 towards Asakusa	Ryomo	Terminus
Shin-Isesaki TI24 towards Tōbu-Dōbutsu-Kōen	Isesaki Line Local	Terminus
Location
- Location within Gunma Prefecture Location within Japan

Isesaki Station (伊勢崎駅, Isesaki-eki) is a junction passenger railway station in the city of Isesaki, Gunma Prefecture, Japan, jointly operated by East Japan Railway Company (JR East) and the private railway operator Tōbu Railway.

== Lines ==
Isesaki Station is a station on the JR East Ryōmō Line, and is located 69.1 km (42.9 mi) from the terminus of the line at Oyama, and 22.6 km (14.0 mi) from Takasaki. The preceding station of Kunisada is 5.8 km (3.6 mi) away and the following station of Komagata is 5.8 km (3.6 mi) away. It also forms the northern terminus of the Tōbu Isesaki Line, and is 114.5 km (71.1 mi) from the starting point of the line at Asakusa in Tokyo. The preceding station of Shin-Isesaki is 1.2 km (0.75 mi) away.

== Station layout ==
=== JR Station ===
The JR East station consists of two elevated island platforms serving four tracks, with the station building underneath. The station has many accessibility features such as escalator, elevators, Mobility scooter access, wheelchair-accessible bathroom, and a Braille Fare table.

1; 2	■ Ryōmō Line	for Maebashi, and Takasaki
3; 4	■ Ryōmō Line	for Kiryū and Oyama

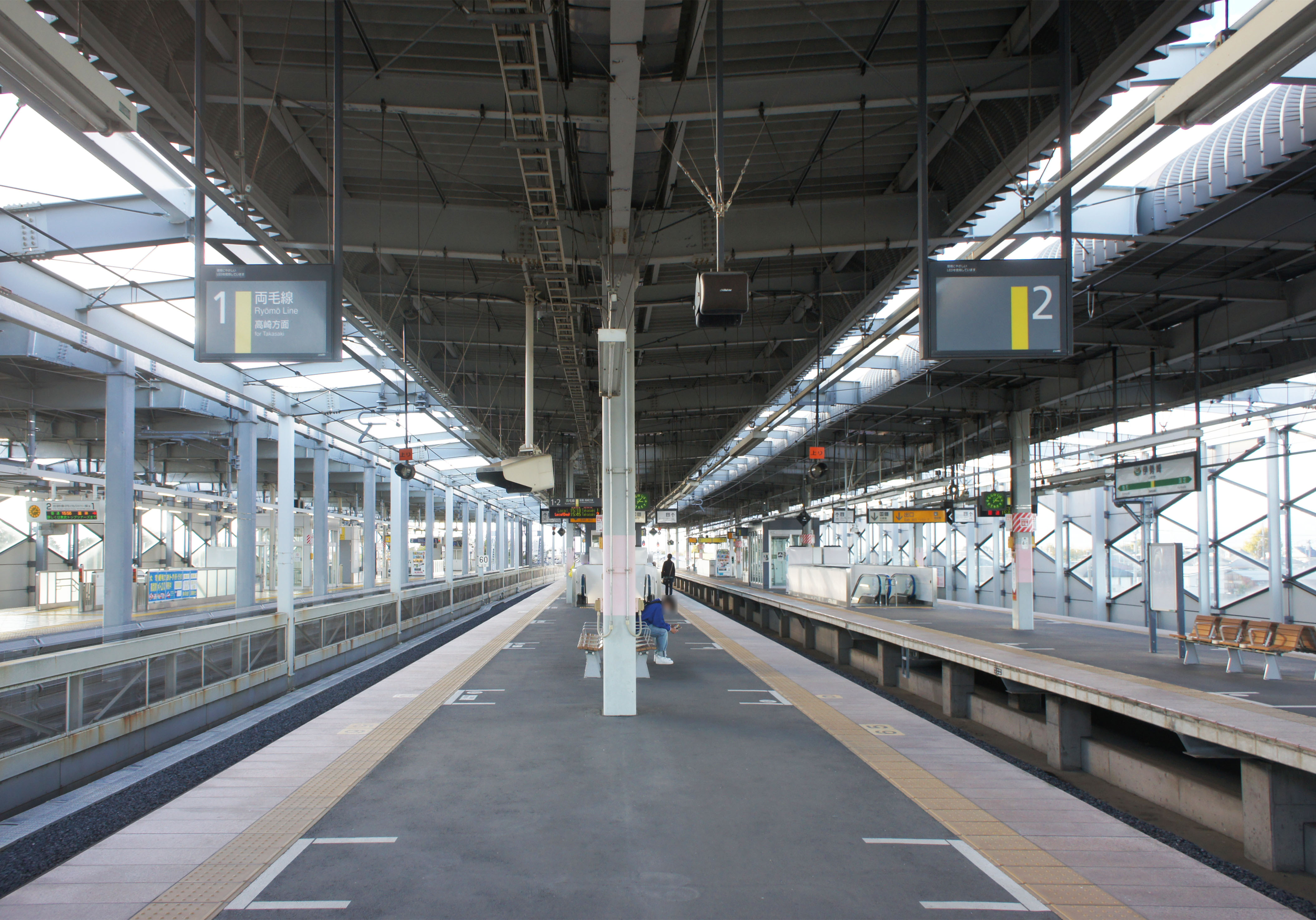
JR East Platforms 1 and 2 November 2021

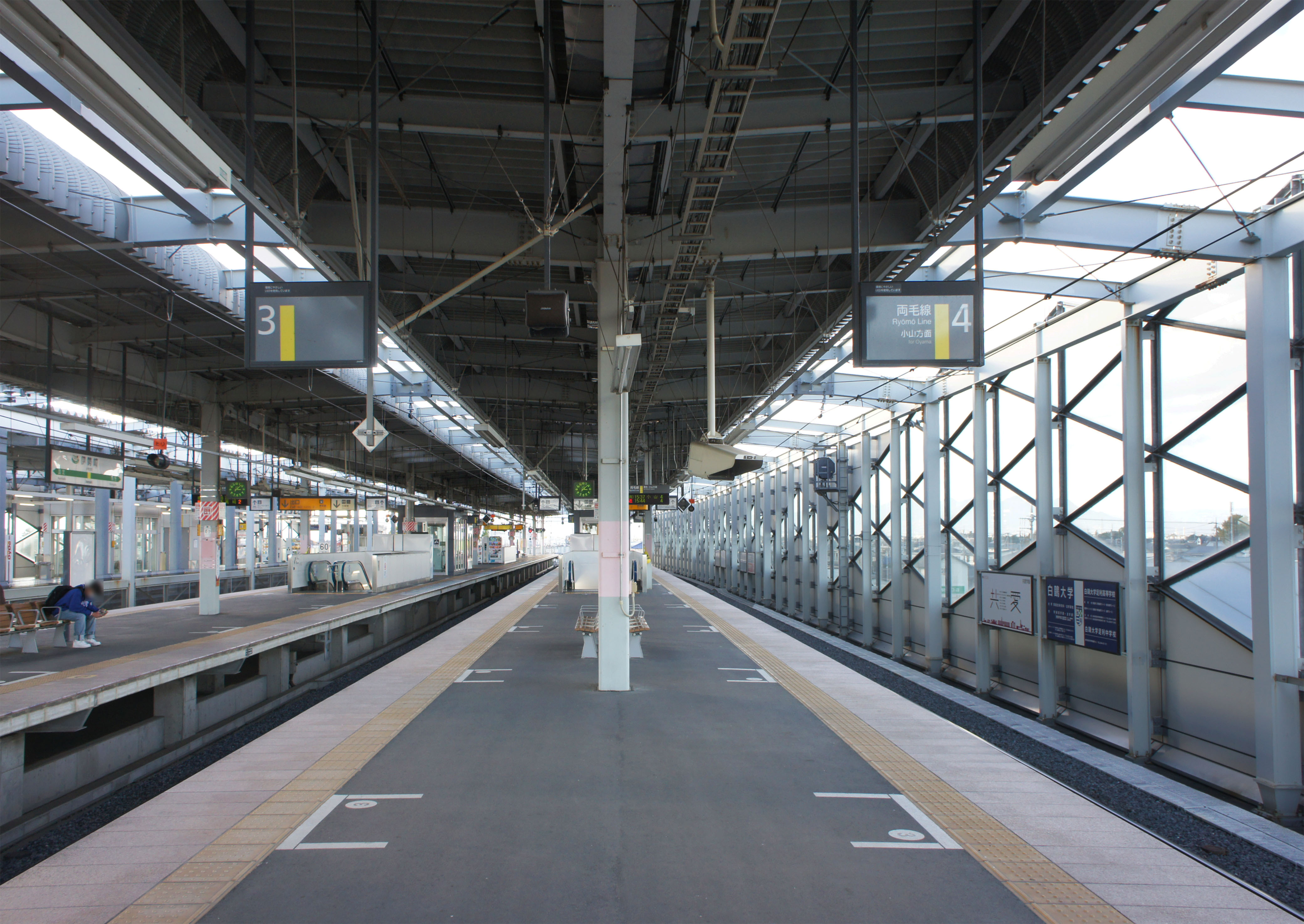
JR East Platforms 3 and 4 November 2011

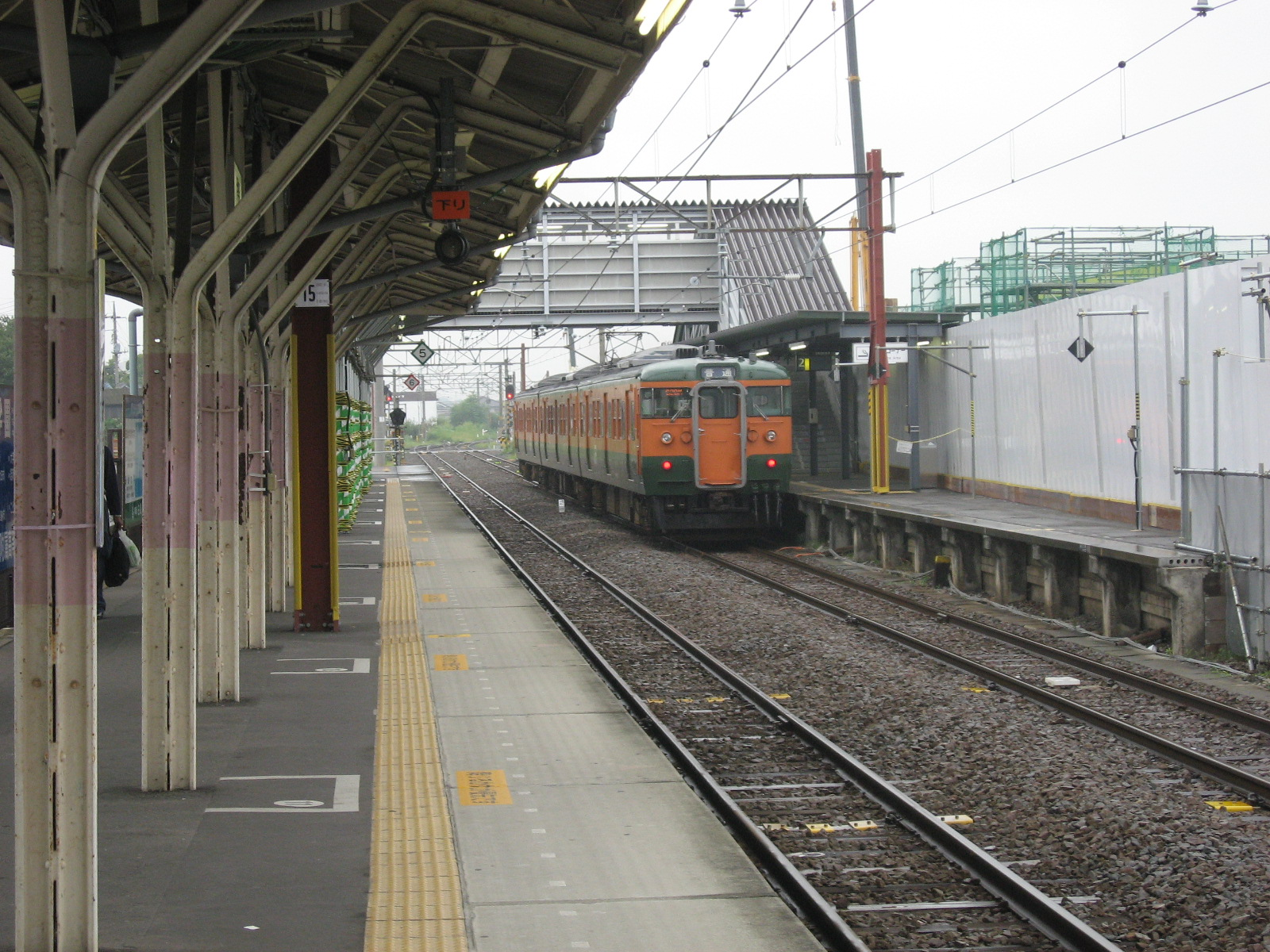
Platforms before Elevation work August 2008

=== Tōbu Station ===
The Tōbu Station consists of one elevated island platform serving two tracks, with the station building located underneath.

=== Platforms ===
1; 2	■ Tōbu Isesaki Line	for Ōta, Ashikagashi, and Asakusa

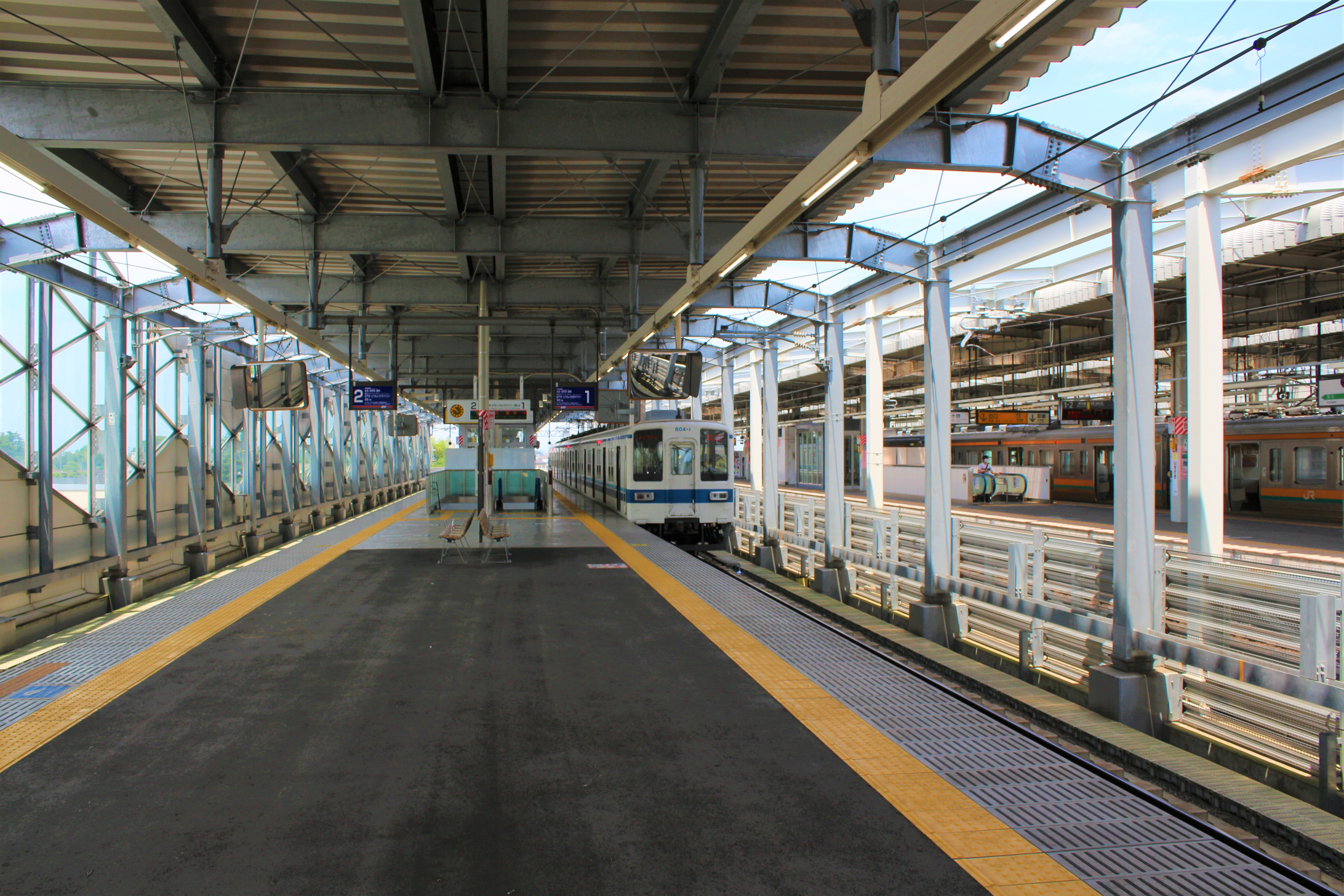
Tobu Platforms June 2020

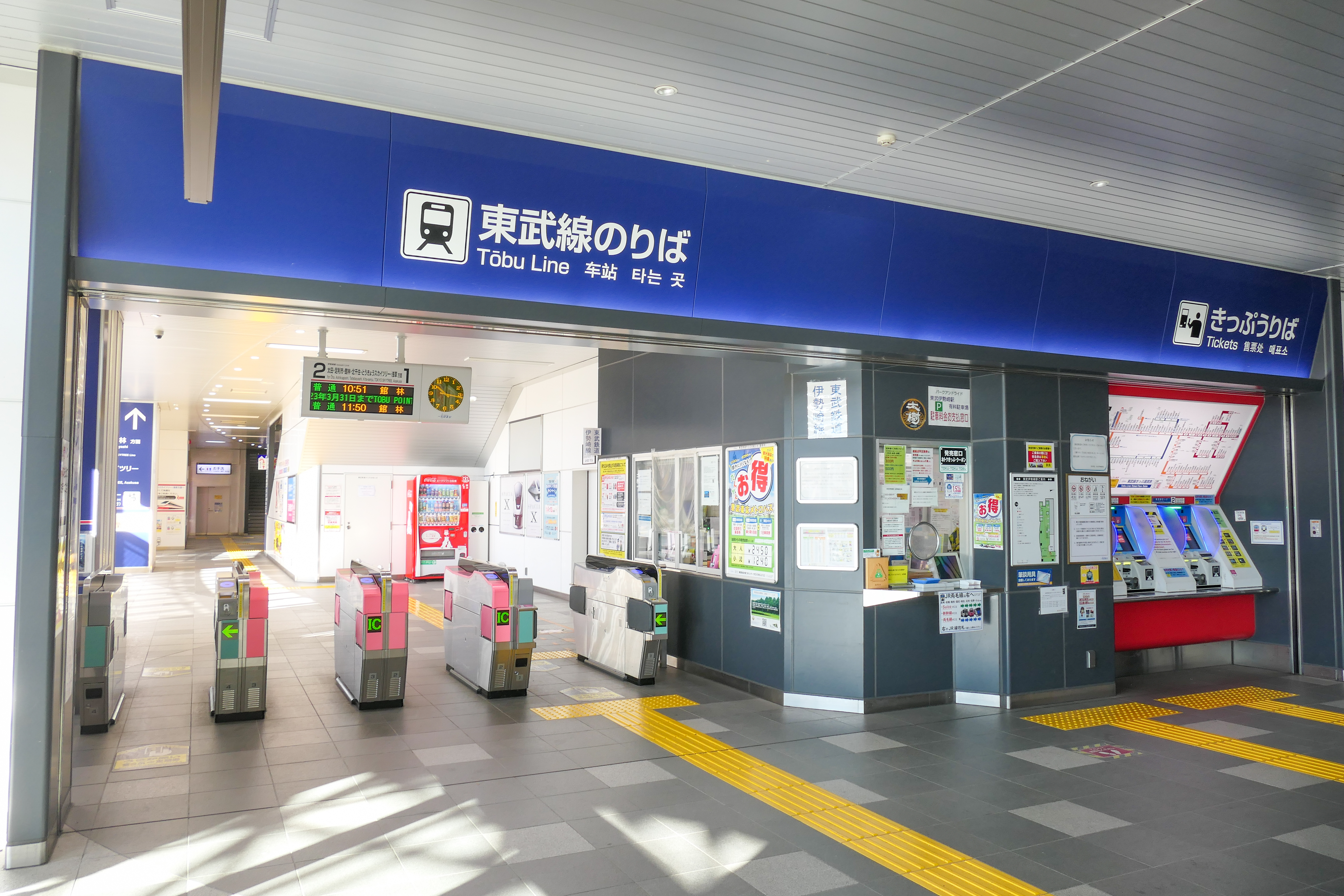
Tobu Station Ticket Gate

== History ==
Isesaki Station was opened on 20 November 1889 for Ryōmō Line service. On 13 July 1910, the Tobu Railway station opened. The station section servicing the Ryōmō Line was absorbed into the JR East network upon the privatization of the Japanese National Railways (JNR) on 1 April 1987.

The JR East station started accepting Suica cards on 18 November 2001, while the Tōbu Station started accepting Pasmo cards on 18 March 2007.

In May 2010, the construction work to elevate the Ryōmō Line platforms in Isesaki Station was completed. From 17 March 2012, station numbering was introduced on all Tōbu lines, with Isesaki Station becoming "TI-25". On 19 October 2013, roughly three years after the completion of the construction work surrounding the Ryōmō Line, the Tobu Isesaki Line elevation work was completed.

The Midori no Madoguchi ticket office was closed on 30 November 2021.

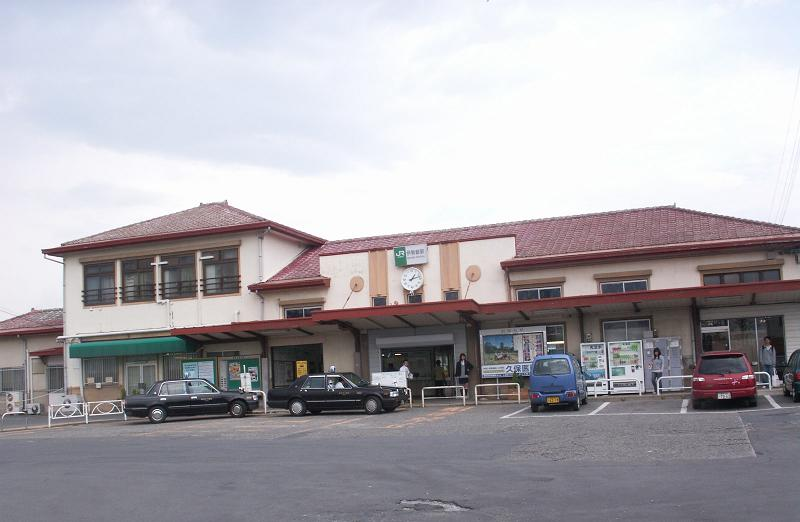
Former station building (May 2007)

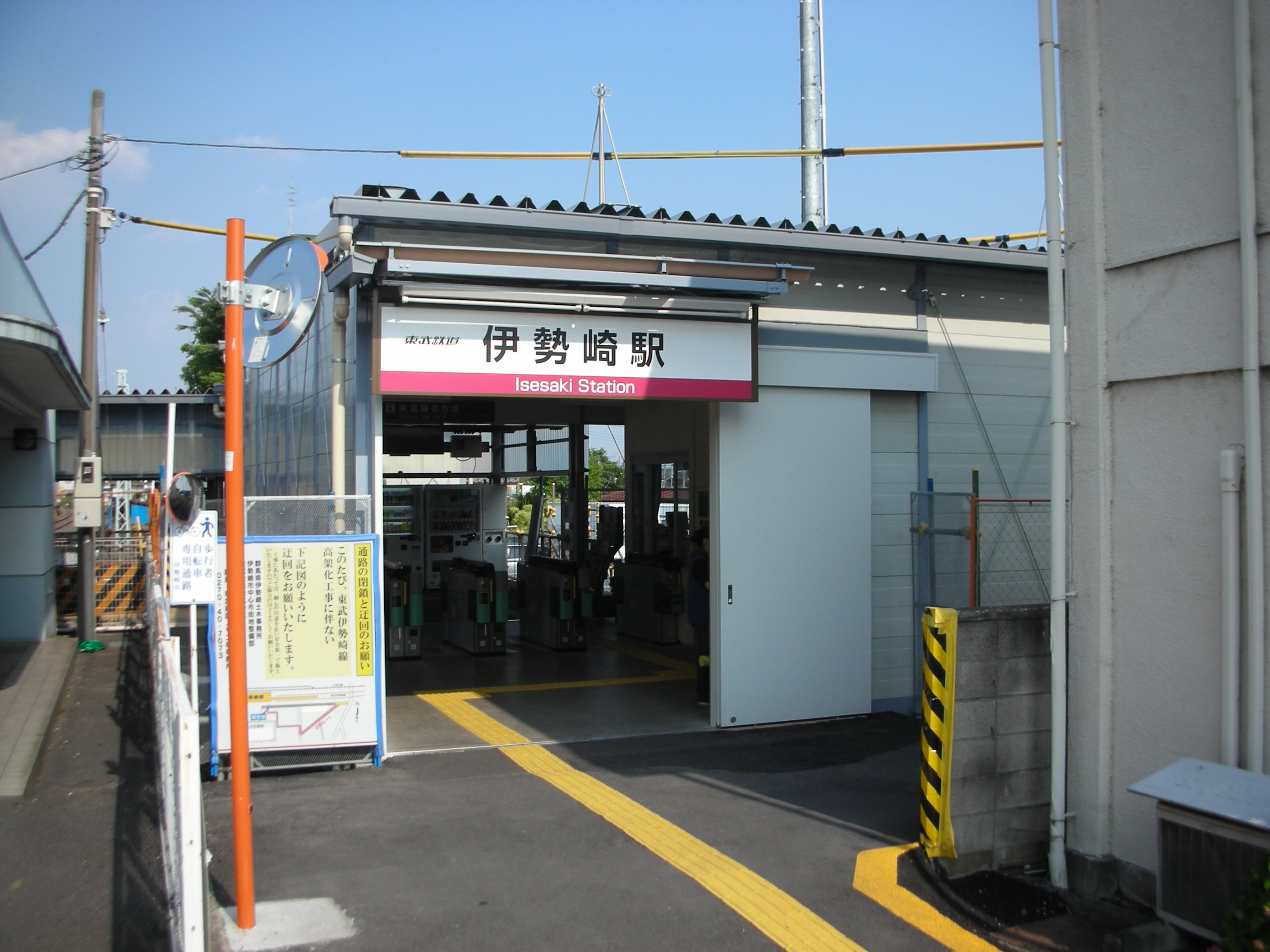
Temporary station building December 2012

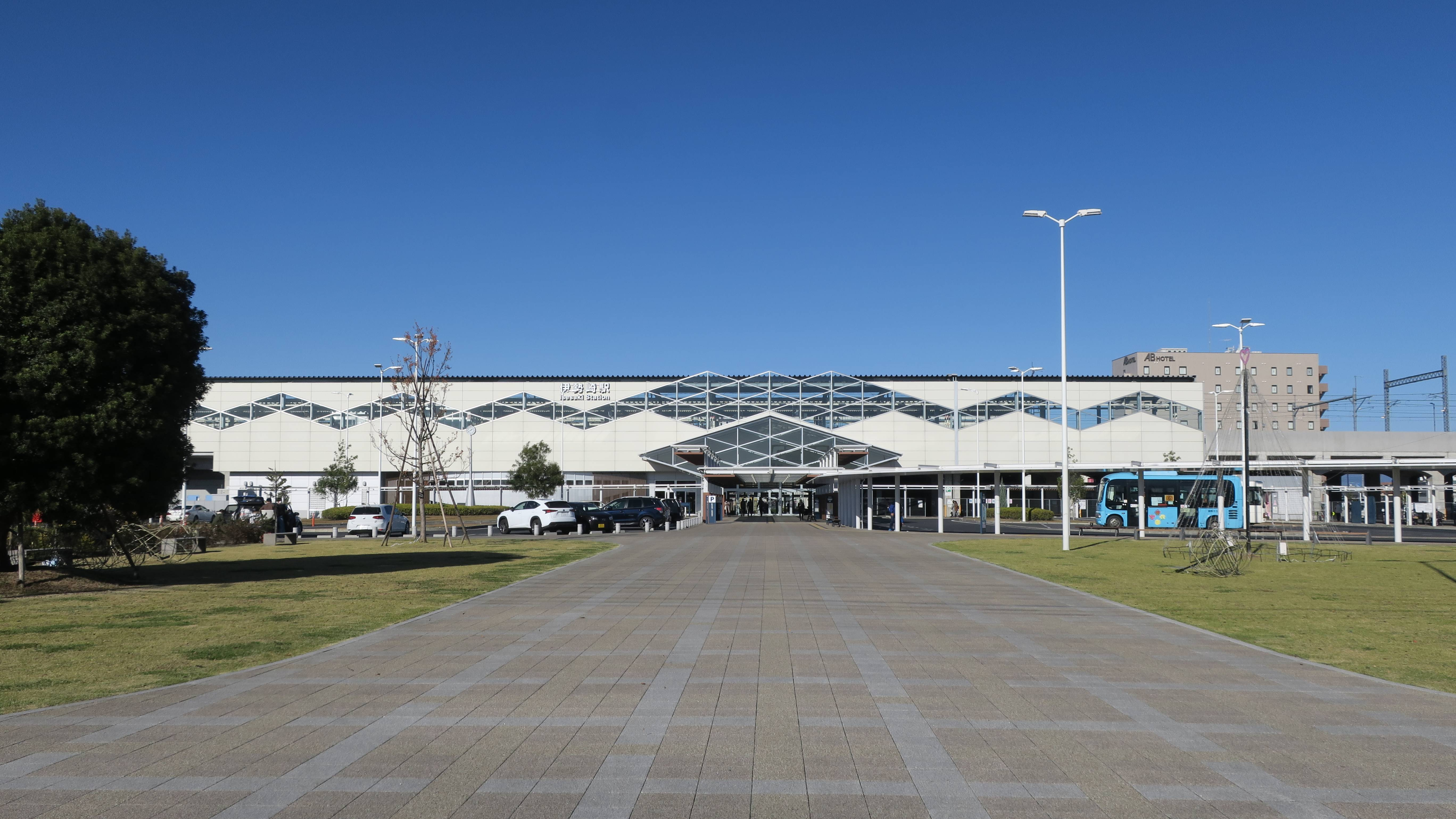
Isesaki Station south entrance November 2020

== Passenger statistics ==
In fiscal 2021, the Tōbu station was used by an average of 5,612 passengers daily. The JR East station was used by 4,920 passengers daily (boarding passengers only).

Below is table containing the passenger statistics since the year 2000:

Passenger statistics
Year	Average Daily Boarding Passengers (JR East)	Average Daily Passengers (Tobu)	Year	Average Daily Boarding Passengers (JR East)	Average Daily Passengers (Tobu)	Year	Average Daily Boarding Passengers (JR East)	Average Daily Passengers (Tobu)
2000	5,144		2010	5,118	5,607	2020	4,418	5,038
2001	4,966		2011	5,193	5,690	2021	4,920	5,612
2002	4,844		2012	5,406	5,998			
2003	4,929		2013	5,608	6,206			
2004	4,923		2014	5,595	6,115			
2005	4,833		2015	5,808	6,367			
2006	4,792	5,333	2016	5,825	6,561			
2007	4,793	5,337	2017	5,987	6,738			
2008	4,931	5,444	2018	6,121	7,003			
2009	4,909	5,372	2019	6,058	6,923			

== Surrounding area ==
- Isesaki Post Office
- Isesaki Shrine
- Gunma Bank Isesaki Branch
- Ashikaga Bank Isesaki Branch
- Towa Bank Isesaki Branch

== Bus routes ==
- SILK LINER (Nippon Chuo Bus)
  - For Osaka City Air Terminal
- Sendai Liner (Nippon Chuo Bus)
  - For Sendai Station (Miyagi)
- Shinjuku-Honjo/Isesaki Line (JR Bus Kanto)
  - For Shinjuku Station
- Kokusai Juo Bus
  - For Honjo Station (Saitama) and Honjo-Waseda Station
- Gunma Chuo Bus
  - For Gunma Prefectural Women's University (Runs on weekdays only)

== See also ==
- List of railway stations in Japan
