= Soka (disambiguation) =

Sōka is a city in Saitama Prefecture, Japan.

Soka may also refer to:

- Soka (Bithynia), a town of ancient Bithynia
- Lake Soka, a lake in Estonia
