= Katsuko =

- Gender: Female

Origin
- Origin: Japanese
- Meaning: Different meanings depending on the kanji used

Katsuko (written 克子 or 勝子) is a feminine Japanese given name. Notable people with the name include:

- Katsuko Kanai (金井 克子; born 1945), Japanese singer and dancer
- Katsuko Kanesaka (金坂 克子; born 1954), Japanese volleyball player
- Katsuko Nishimoto (西本 勝子; 1950–2025), Japanese politician
- Katsuko Saruhashi (猿橋 勝子; 1920–2007), Japanese scientist
