= Takenotsuka Station =

Railway station in Tokyo, Japan

Coordinates: 35°47′40″N 139°47′27″E

TS14 Takenotsuka Station 竹ノ塚駅
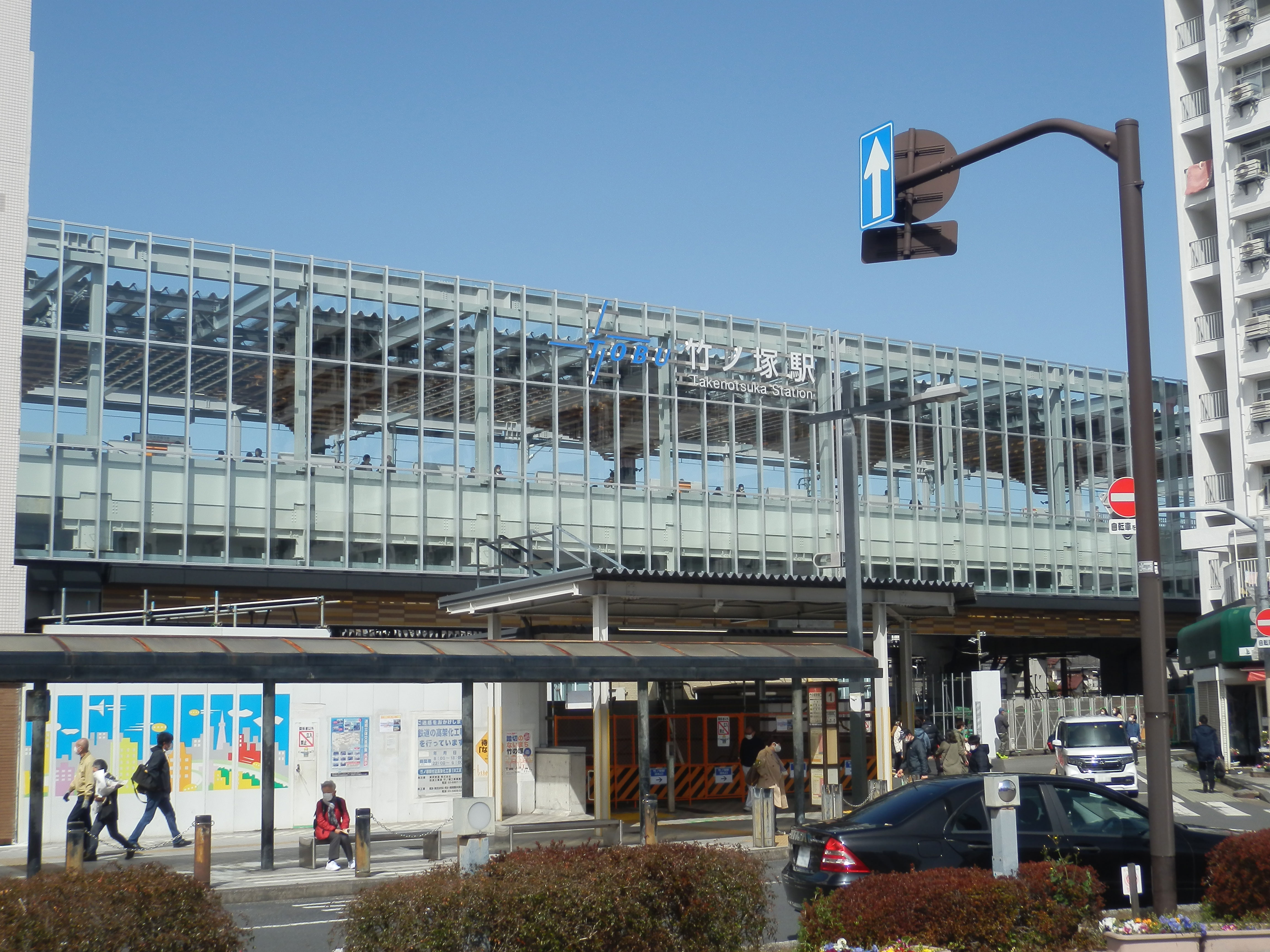
- The east entrance of Takenotsuka Station, March 2022

General information
- Location: 6-6-1 Takenotsuka, Adachi, Tokyo （足立区竹の塚6-6-1） Japan
- Operator: Tobu Railway
- Line: Tobu Skytree Line

Other information
- Station code: TS-14

History
- Opened: 1900

Passengers
- FY2024: 33,814 daily boardings

Services
Preceding station	Tobu Railway	Following station
Nishiarai TS13 towards Asakusa	Tobu Skytree Line Local	Yatsuka TS15 towards Tōbu-Dōbutsu-Kōen
Location

Takenotsuka Station (竹ノ塚駅, Takenotsuka-eki) is a railway station in Adachi, Tokyo, Japan, operated by the private railway operator Tobu Railway.

== Lines ==
Takenotsuka Station is served by the Tobu Skytree Line, and is located 13.4 km from the line's Tokyo terminus at Asakusa.

== Station layout ==
The station consists of one island platform serving two tracks. There are two additional tracks that are used by trains skipping this stop.

=== Platforms ===
1	Tōbu Skytree Line	for Kita-Senju, Hikifune, and Asakusa; Tokyo Metro Hibiya Line for Ueno and Naka-meguro
2	Tōbu Skytree Line	for Sōka, Kita-Koshigaya, Kasukabe, and Tōbu-Dōbutsu-Kōen; Tobu Isesaki Line for Kuki; Tōbu Nikkō Line for Minami-Kurihashi

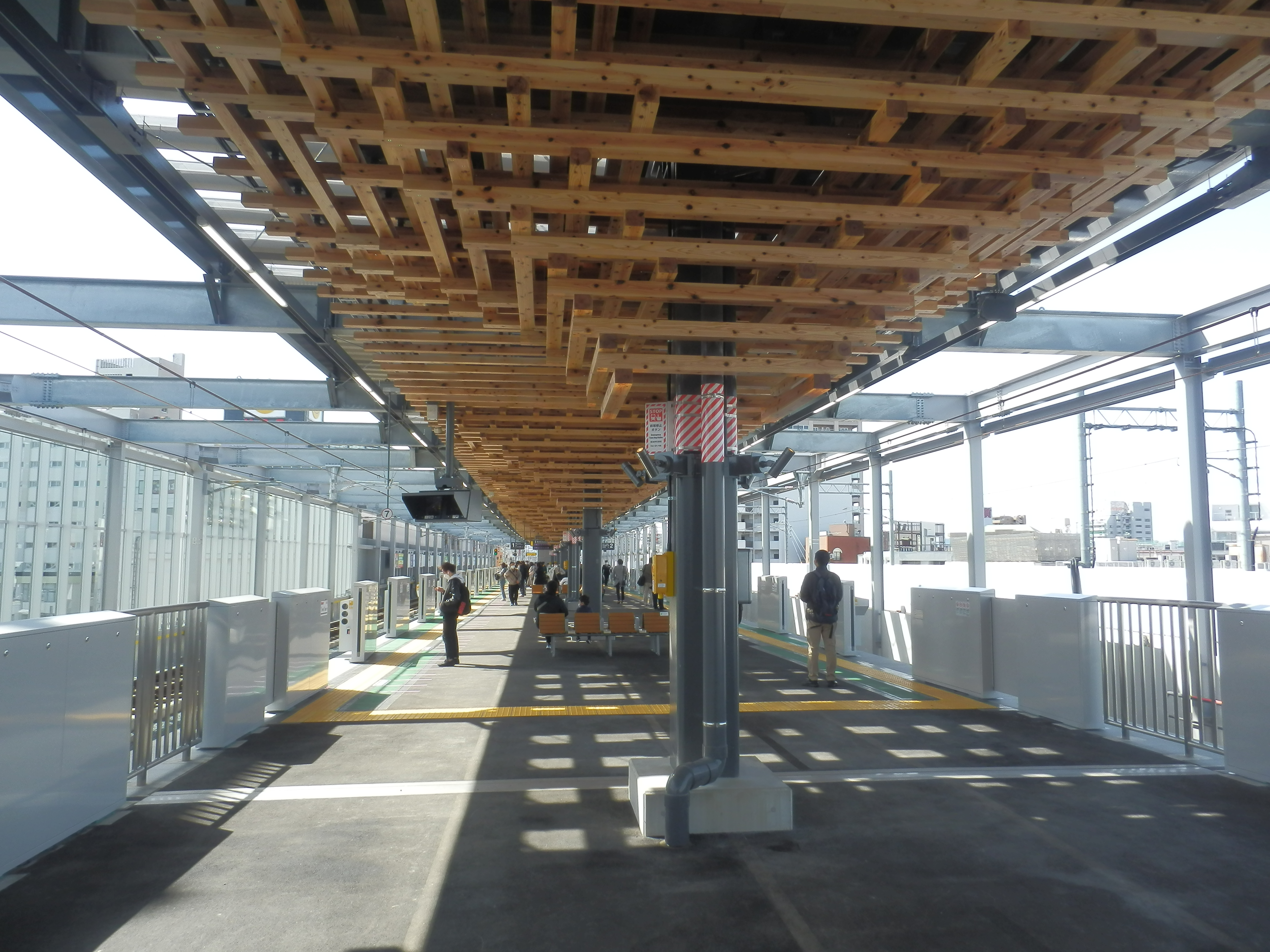
Station platforms, March 2022

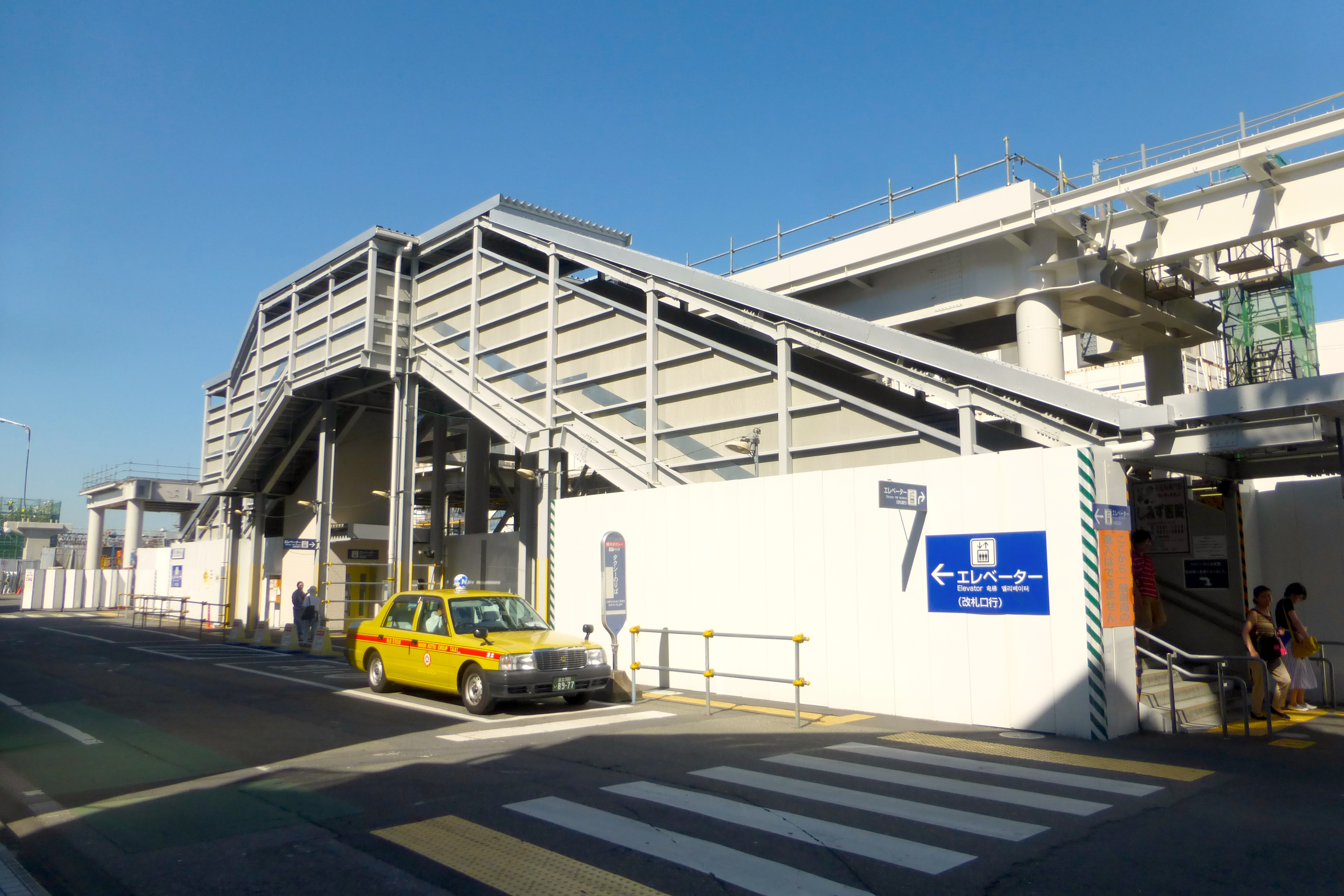
West exit, July 2015

== History ==
The station opened on 21 March 1900.

From 17 March 2012, station numbering was introduced on all Tobu lines, with Takenotsuka Station becoming "TS-14".

== Passenger statistics ==
In fiscal 2024, the station was used by an average of 33,814 passengers daily (boarding passengers only).

== See also ==
- List of railway stations in Japan
