= Catholic University of Daegu =

University in Daegu, South Korea

Daegu Catholic University
- 대구가톨릭대학교
- Former names: Catholic University of Daegu, Hyosung Catholic University, Hyosung Women's University
- Motto: Amare Servire
- Type: Private
- Established: 1914
- Affiliations: Catholic
- President: Dr. Han-Gee Seong
- Students: 15,000
- Undergraduates: 13,000
- Postgraduates: 2,000
- Location: 13-13 Hayang-ro, Hayang-eup, Gyeongsan, Gyeongsangbuk-do, South Korea, Gyeongsan, North Gyeongsang, South Korea; 35.91219°N 128.80775°E
- Campus: Urban, Multiple sites
- Website: www.cu.ac.kr

Korean name
- Hangul: 대구가톨릭대학교
- Hanja: 大邱가톨릭大學校
- RR: Daegu gatollik daehakgyo
- MR: Taegu kat'ollik taehakkyo

Daegu Catholic University (DCU; Korean: 대구가톨릭대학교), previously named Catholic University of Daegu, is a private research university in Daegu, South Korea. DCU is known for its academic strength, especially in the field of medical, pharmacy, health science, psychology, social science, and education.

== History ==
The St. Justin Seminary, from which the university claims descent, opened in Daegu on November 1, 1914, having been founded in May of that year. The first four rectors of the school were French missionaries, the first being a Fr. Chargeboeuf, also known by his Korean name Song Duck-mang (송덕망). The first Korean rector, Fr. Choi Min-sun (최민순), who took up the post in 1945, was also the last rector of the seminary which closed the same year, sending most of its students home in May but remaining open until December to allow the final class of 4 to graduate.

In 1952, the Hyosung Women's Junior College (효성여자초급대학) was established, offering instruction to 150 students in the fields of music, literature, and home economics. The following year, it became a four-year college, also offering instruction in pharmacology. The college continued to expand steadily in the following years, establishing its graduate school in 1972 and gaining university status in 1980.

== International relations ==
Daegu Catholic University maintains international relations with 290 universities & Colleges & Institutions in 39 countries:

The ASEAN International Mobility for Students (AIMS) programme member

- SEAMEO RIHED

=== IFCU member ===
- International Federation of Catholic Universities

=== ASEACCU member ===
- The Association of South East Asian Catholic Colleges and Universities

=== Australia ===
- Australian Catholic University

=== Canada ===
- The University of Alberta

=== China ===
- China National Academy of Fine Art
- China Sichuan Normal University
- Chongqing University of Arts and Sciences
- Guangdong University of Foreign Studies
- Guizhou Normal University
- Henan University of Traditional Chinese Medicine
- Jilin University
- Luoyang Normal University
- Nanjing Normal University
- Shandong Economic University
- Shandong University
- The Central University of Nationalities
- Jiangxi Normal University
- Yanbian University
- Zibo Vocational Institute

=== France ===
- Université Catholique de Lille

=== Germany ===
- Martin-Luther-University Halle-Wittenberg

=== Hungary ===
- Ferenc Liszt Academy of Music

=== Indonesia ===
- Atma Jaya Indonesia Catholic University, Jakarta
- Atma Jaya Yogyakarta University
- Universitas Nasional
- State University of Malang
- Indonesia International Institute for Life Science
- SEAMOLEC

=== Italy ===
- Accademia di Belle Arti di Brera
- Conservatorio di Musica S. Cecilia di Roma
- Conservatorio Statale di Musica "Giuseppe Verdi"
- Pontificio Istituto di Musica Sacra
- Universita Cattolica del Sacro Cuore
- Universita per Stranieri di Perugia

=== Japan ===
- Aichi Shukutoku University
- Beppu University
- Dokkyo University
- Elisabeth University of Music
- Saga University
- Sophia University
- University of Occupational Health Environmental Health

=== Mexico ===
- Universidad de Guadalajara

=== Mongolia ===
- Mongolian University of Science and Technology

=== Philippines ===
- Ateneo de Manila University
- De La Salle University
- San Beda University
- University of Saint La Salle
- University of San Agustin
- University of Santo Tomas
- University of Eastern Philippines

=== Russia ===
- Buryat State University
- Donsky State Technical University
- Peoples' Friendship University of Russia
- Russian State University for the Humanities
- Saint Petersburg State University
- Krasnoyarsk State Pedagogical University named after V.P. Astafyev

=== Spain ===
- Universidad Pontificia de Salamanca

=== Taiwan ===
- Fu Jen Catholic University
- Providence University

=== United Kingdom ===
- University College London

=== United States ===
- Catholic Health Association of USA, Georgetown University
- Central Michigan University
- Doane College
- Georgia Southern University
- Kettering University(GMI Institute)
- Minnesota State University, Mankato
- Mississippi State University
- Murray State University
- North Dakota State University
- The University of Alabama
- University of California, Merced
- University of Kansas
- University of North Carolina School of Medicine
- Western Michigan University

=== Uzbekistan ===
- Tashkent University

=== Vietnam ===
- VN-UK Institute for Research and Executive Education, the University of Danang

== Campuses ==
- Hyosung campus -[main]
- St. Justin campus - [Theology]
- St. Luke campus -[Medical school/Nursing school/DCU Hospital]

== Global rankings ==
- The Center for World Rankings (CWUR)
- Scimago Institutions
- US News Global University rankings
