= Shinden Station (Saitama) =

Railway station in Sōka, Saitama Prefecture, Japan

TS18 Shinden Station 新田駅
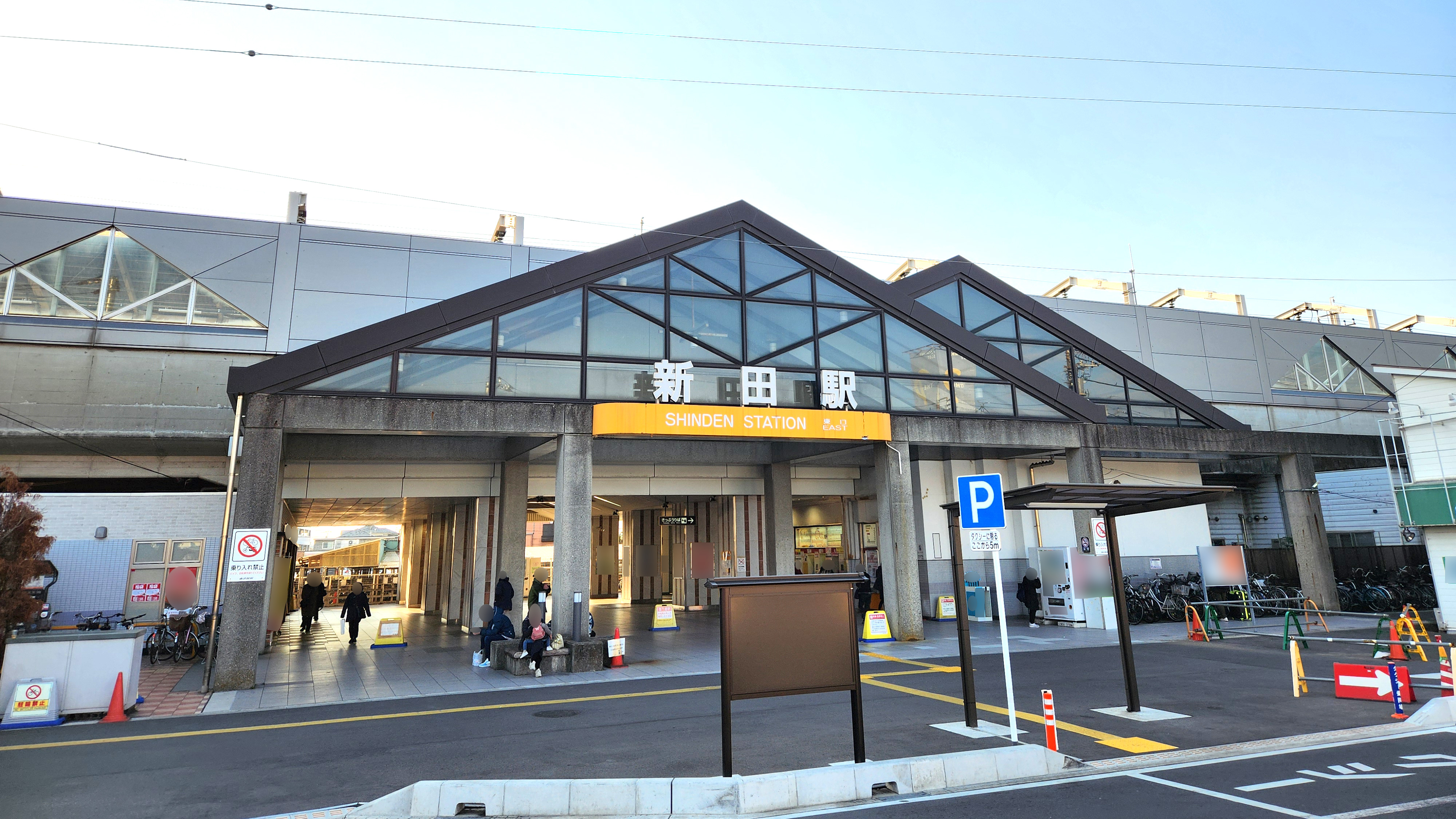
- Shiden Station east entrance in December 2023

General information
- Location: 263-2 Kinmeichō, Sōka-shi, Saitama-ken 340-0052; Japan
- Coordinates: 35.85411°N 139.79537°E
- Operator: Tōbu Railway
- Line: Tōbu Skytree Line
- Distance: 20.5 km from Asakusa
- Platforms: 1 island platform
- Tracks: 4

Construction
- Structure type: Elevated

Other information
- Station code: TS-18
- Website: Official website

History
- Opened: 20 December 1899
- Rebuilt: March 1992

Passengers
- FY2024: 14,599 daily boardings

Services
Preceding station	Tobu Railway	Following station
Dokkyodaigakumae TS17 towards Asakusa	Tobu Skytree Line Local	Gamō TS19 towards Tōbu-Dōbutsu-Kōen
Location
- Location within Saitama Prefecture Location within Japan

Shinden Station (新田駅, Shinden-eki) is a passenger railway station located in the city of Sōka, Saitama, Japan, operated by the private railway operator Tōbu Railway.

== Lines ==
Shingen Station is served by the Tōbu Skytree Line, and is 20.5 kilometers from the Tokyo terminus of the line at Asakusa.

== Station layout ==
The station has one elevated island platform serving two tracks. The station building is located underneath the platforms. There are two additional tracks for non-stop trains to bypass this station.

=== Platforms ===
1	Tōbu Skytree Line	for Kita-Senju, Hikifune, and Asakusa; Tokyo Metro Hibiya Line for Ueno and Naka-meguro
2	Tōbu Skytree Line	for Kita-Koshigaya, Kasukabe, and Tōbu-Dōbutsu-Kōen; Tobu Nikko Line for Minami-Kurihashi

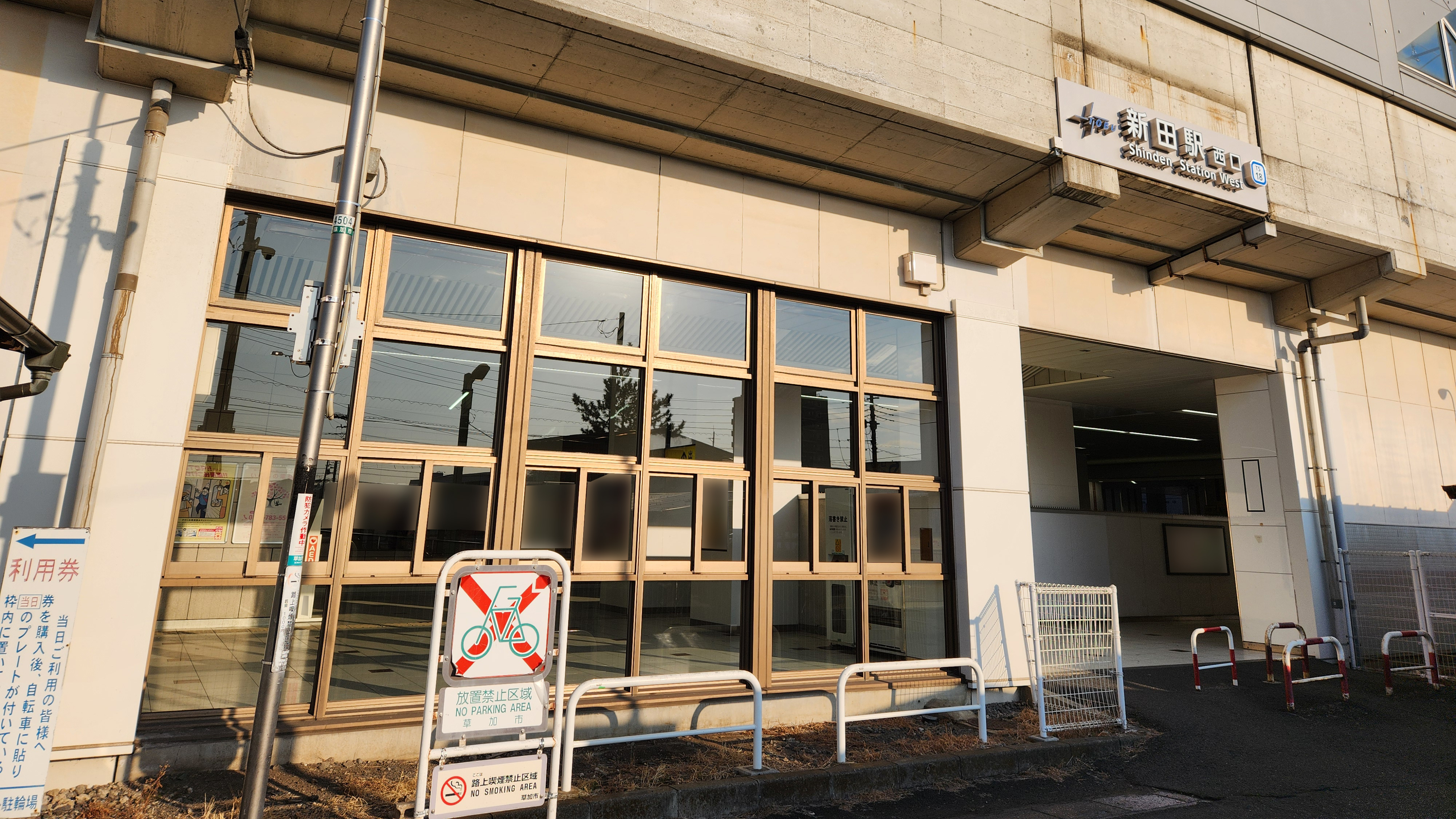
The west entrance in December 2023

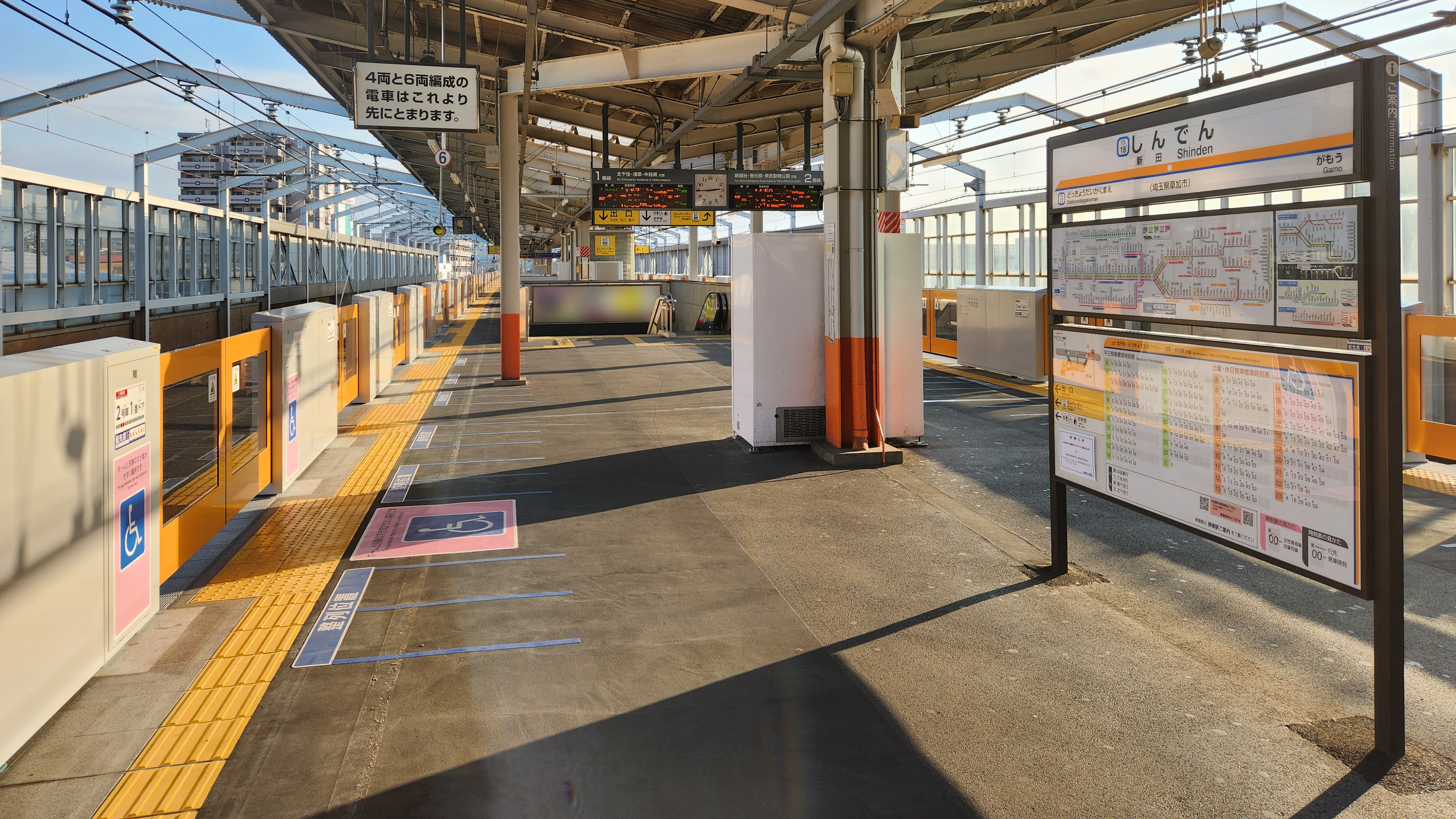
The platform in December 2023

== History ==
The station opened on 20 December 1899. The station was closed on 2 December 1908 and reopened on 10 November 1925. It was rebuilt as an elevated station in March 1992.

From 17 March 2012, station numbering was introduced on all Tōbu lines, with Shinden Station becoming "TS-18".

== Passenger statistics ==
In fiscal 2024, the station was used by an average of 14,599 passengers daily (boarding passengers only).

== Surrounding area ==
- Sōka Asahimachi Danchi New Town
- Gamo Post Office
- Sōka Park

== See also ==
- List of railway stations in Japan
