= Yatsuka Station =

Railway station in Sōka, Saitama Prefecture, Japan

TS15 Yatsuka Station 谷塚駅
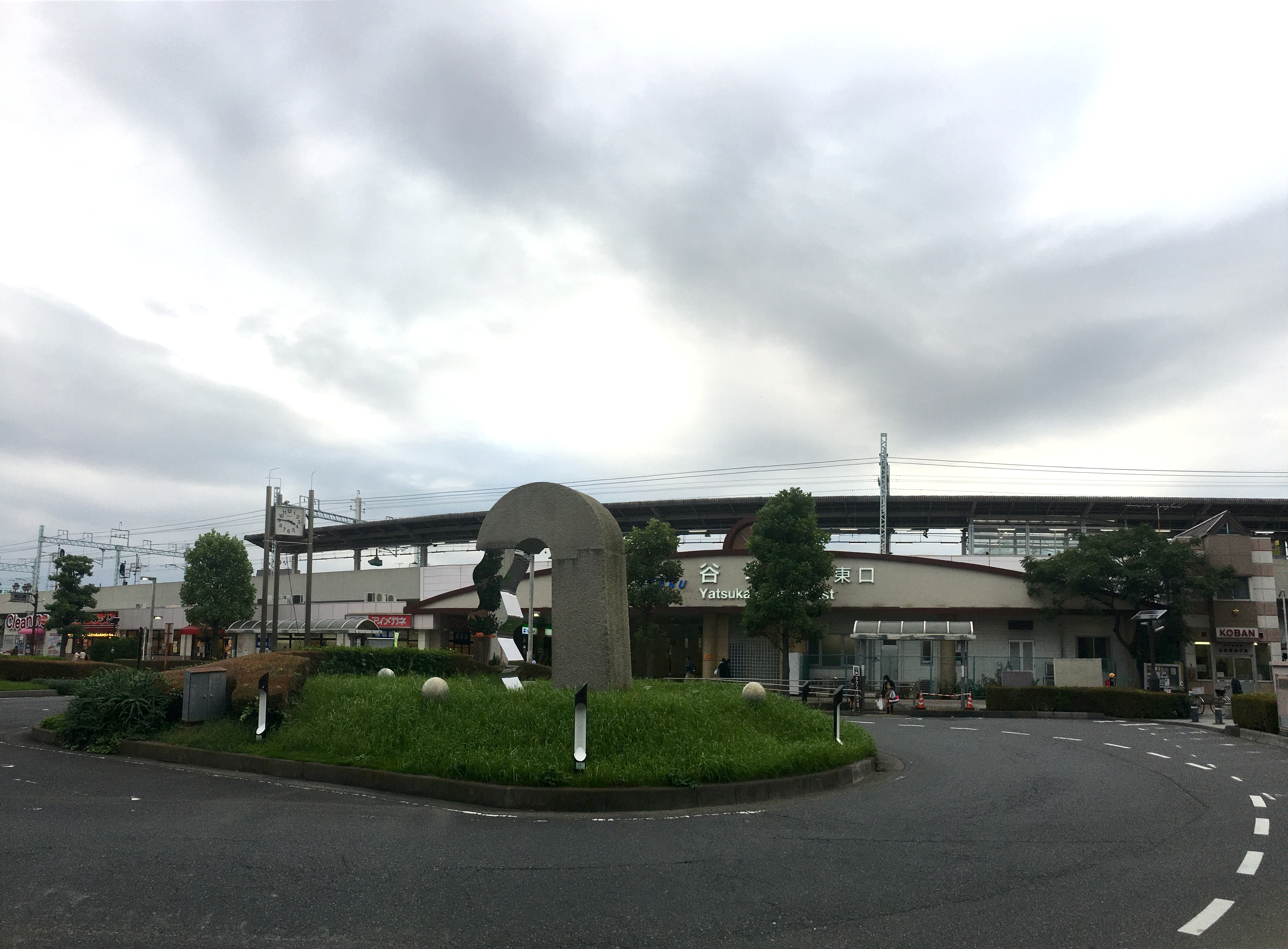
- Yatsuka Station East Exit, October 2020

General information
- Location: 1-1-22 Yatsuka, Sōka-shi, Saitama-ken 340-0028; Japan
- Coordinates: 35.8151°N 139.8014°E
- Operator: Tōbu Railway
- Line: Tōbu Skytree Line
- Distance: 15.9 km from Asakusa
- Platforms: 1 island platform

Other information
- Station code: TS-15
- Website: Official website

History
- Opened: 1 October 1925

Passengers
- FY2024: 19,170 daily boardings

Services
Preceding station	Tobu Railway	Following station
Takenotsuka TS14 towards Asakusa	Tobu Skytree Line Local	Sōka TS16 towards Tōbu-Dōbutsu-Kōen
Location
- Location within Saitama Prefecture Location within Japan

Yatsuka Station (谷塚駅, Yatsuka-eki) is a passenger railway station located in the city of Sōka, Saitama, Japan, operated by the private railway operator Tōbu Railway.

== Line ==
Yatsuka Station is served by the Tobu Skytree Line, and is 15.9 kilometers from the terminus of the line at Asakusa Station.

== Station layout ==
The station has one elevated island platform with two tracks. The station building is located underneath the platforms. There are additional tracks for express trains to bypass this station.

=== Platforms ===
1	Tōbu Skytree Line	for Kita-Senju, Hikifune, and Asakusa; Tokyo Metro Hibiya Line for Ueno and Naka-meguro
2	Tōbu Skytree Line	for Sōka, Kita-Koshigaya, Kasukabe, and Tōbu-Dōbutsu-Kōen; Tobu Isesaki Line for Kuki; Tōbu Nikkō Line for Minami-Kurihashi

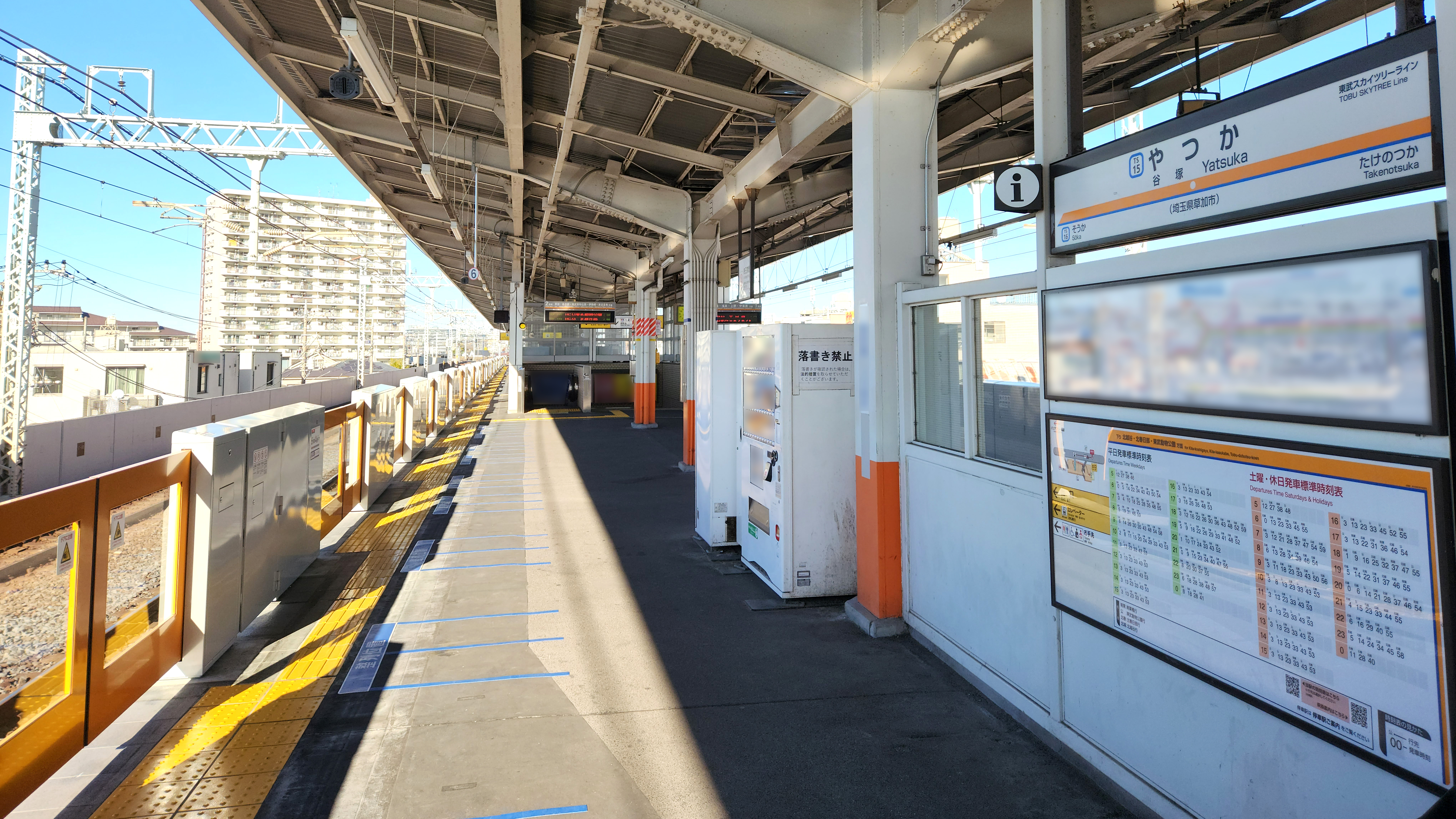
Station platform in November 2023

== History ==
The station opened on 1 October 1925. From 17 March 2012, station numbering was introduced on all Tōbu lines, with Yatsuka Station becoming "TS-15".

== Passenger statistics ==
In fiscal 2024, the station was used by an average of 19,170 passengers daily (boarding passengers only).

== Surrounding area ==
- Yatsuka Post Office

== See also ==
- List of railway stations in Japan
