= Dokkyodaigakumae Station =

Railway station in Sōka, Saitama Prefecture, Japan

TS17 Dokkyodaigakumae Station (Soka-Matsubara) 獨協大学前駅〈草加松原〉
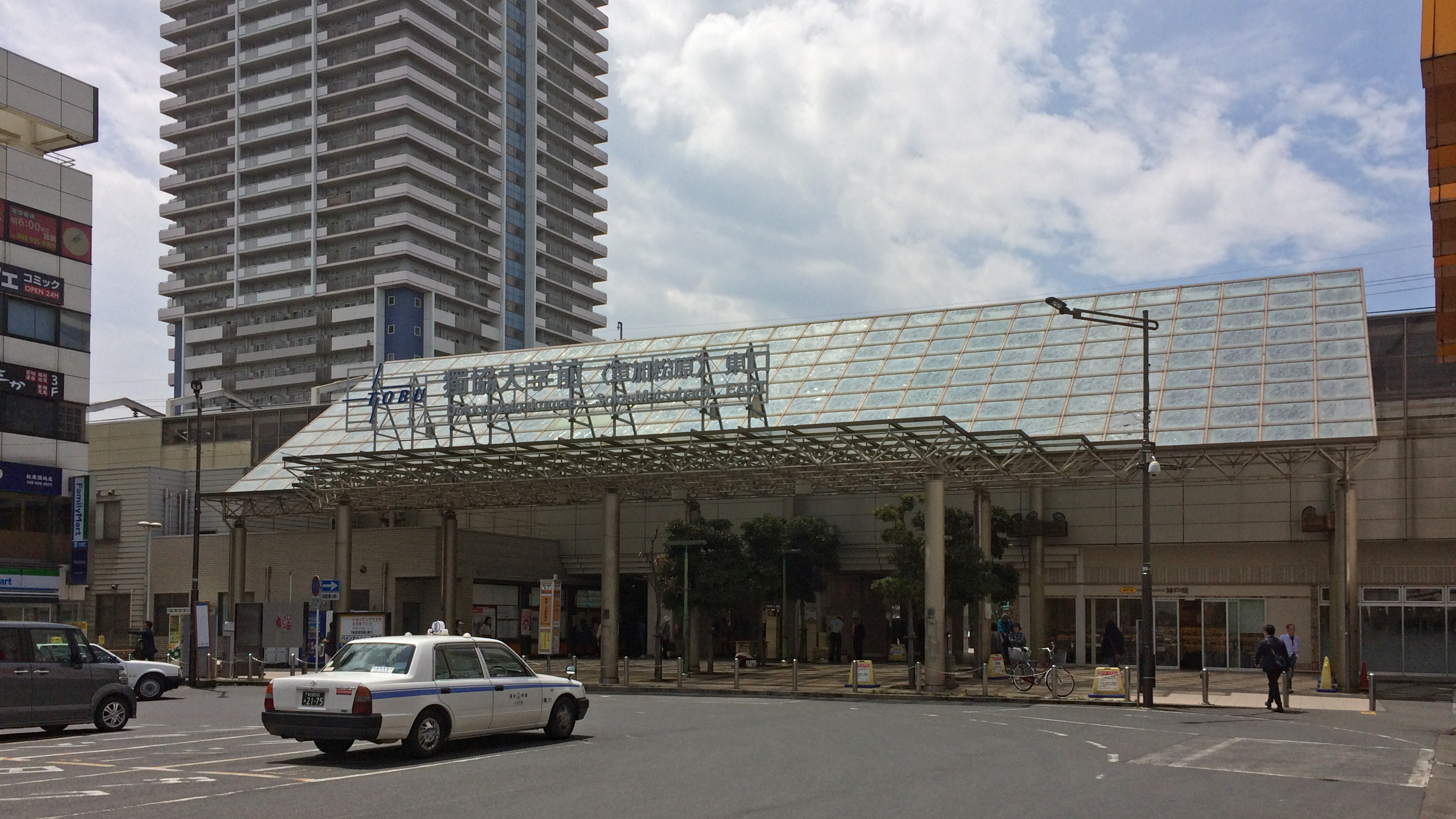
- The east side of Dokkyodaigakumae Station in May 2017

General information
- Location: 1-1-1 Matsubara, Sōka-shi, Saitama-ken 340-0041; Japan
- Coordinates: 35.8435°N 139.8007°E
- Operator: Tōbu Railway
- Line: Tōbu Skytree Line
- Distance: 19.2 km (11.9 mi) from Asakusa
- Platforms: 1 island platform
- Tracks: 4

Construction
- Structure type: Elevated

Other information
- Station code: TS-17
- Website: Official website

History
- Opened: 1 December 1962
- Rebuilt: 1992
- Former names: Matsubaradanchi (until 31 March 2017)

Passengers
- FY2024: 28,205 daily boardings

Services
Preceding station	Tobu Railway	Following station
Sōka TS16 towards Asakusa	Tobu Skytree Line Local	Shinden TS18 towards Tōbu-Dōbutsu-Kōen
Location
- Location within Saitama Prefecture Location within Japan

Dokkyodaigakumae Station (Soka-Matsubara) (獨協大学前駅 〈草加松原〉, Dokkyōdaigakumae-eki (Sōka-Matsubara); lit. "in front of Dokkyo University") is a passenger railway station located in the city of Sōka, Saitama, Japan, operated by the private railway operator Tōbu Railway. Opened in 1962, the station was formerly known as Matsubaradanchi Station until it was renamed in April 2017.

== Lines ==
Dokkyodaigakumae Station is served by the Tōbu Skytree Line, and is 19.2 kilometres (11.9 mi) from the terminus of the line at Asakusa Station in Tokyo.

== Station layout ==
The station has one elevated island platform with two tracks. The station building is located underneath the platforms. There are two additional tracks for non-stop trains to bypass this station.

=== Platforms ===
1	Tōbu Skytree Line	for Kita-Senju, Hikifune, and Asakusa; Tokyo Metro Hibiya Line for Ueno and Naka-meguro
2	Tōbu Skytree Line	for Kita-Koshigaya, Kasukabe, and Tōbu-Dōbutsu-Kōen; Tobu Nikko Line for Minami-Kurihashi

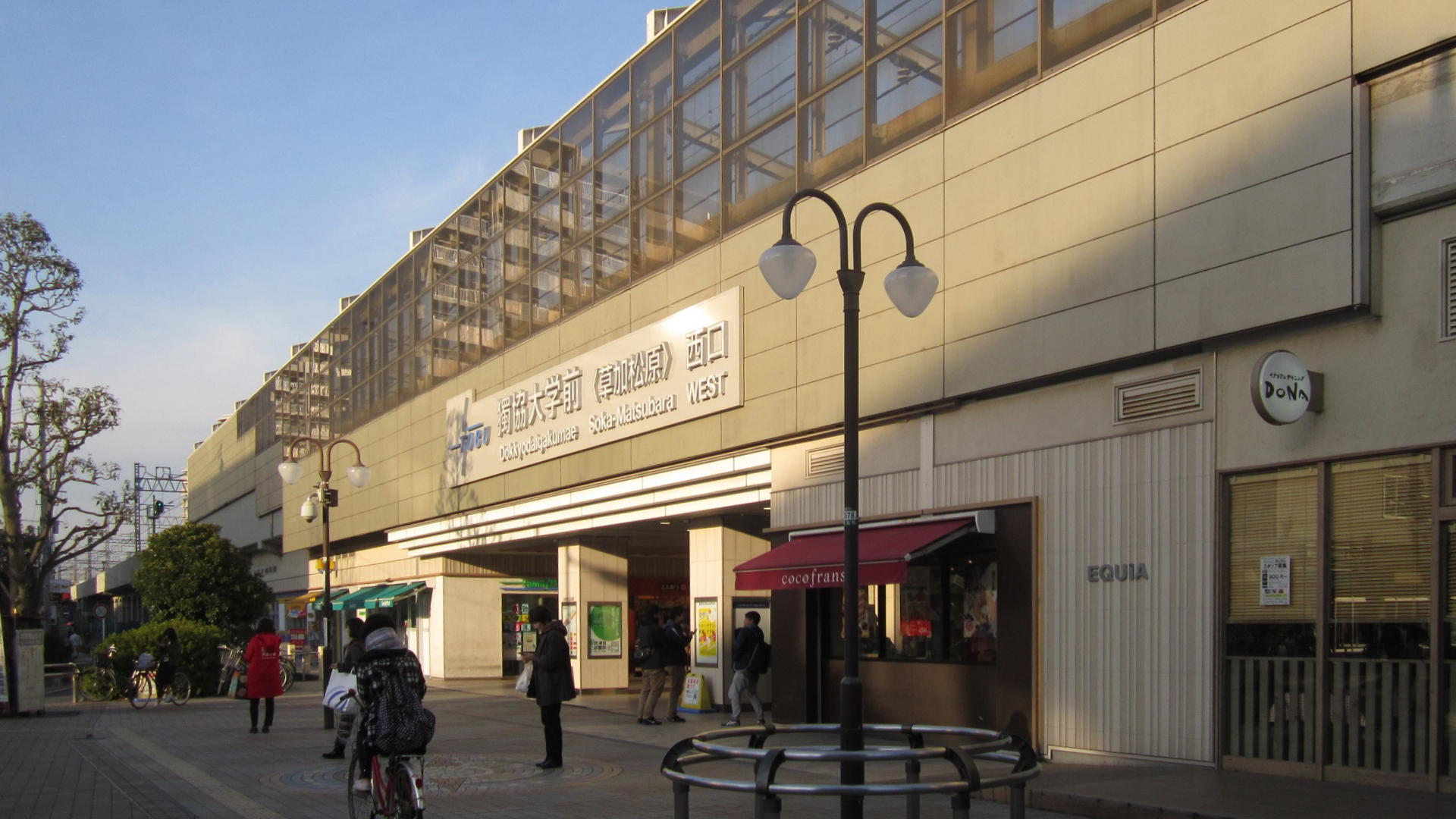
The west entrance in December 2017

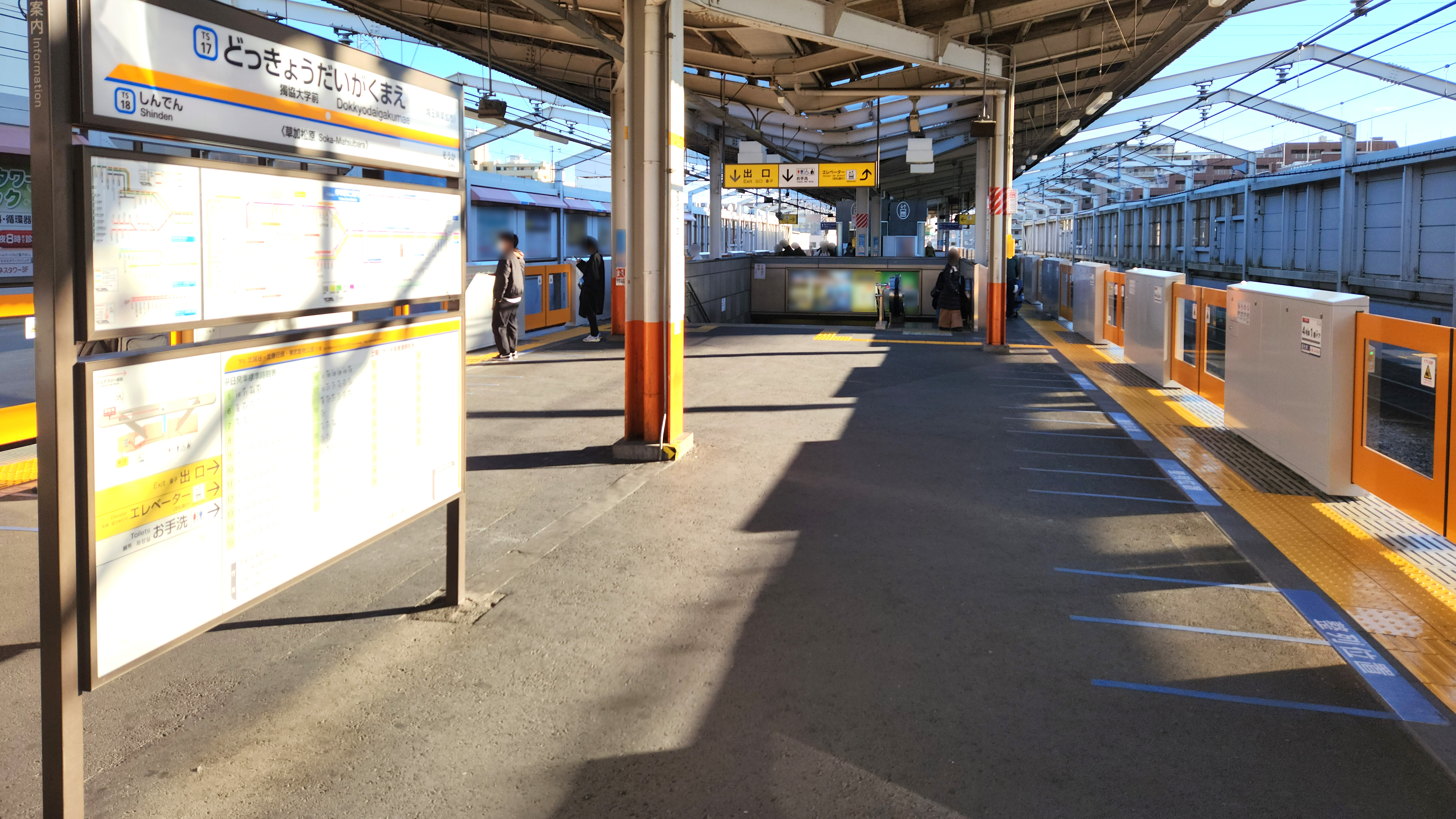
The platform in December 2022

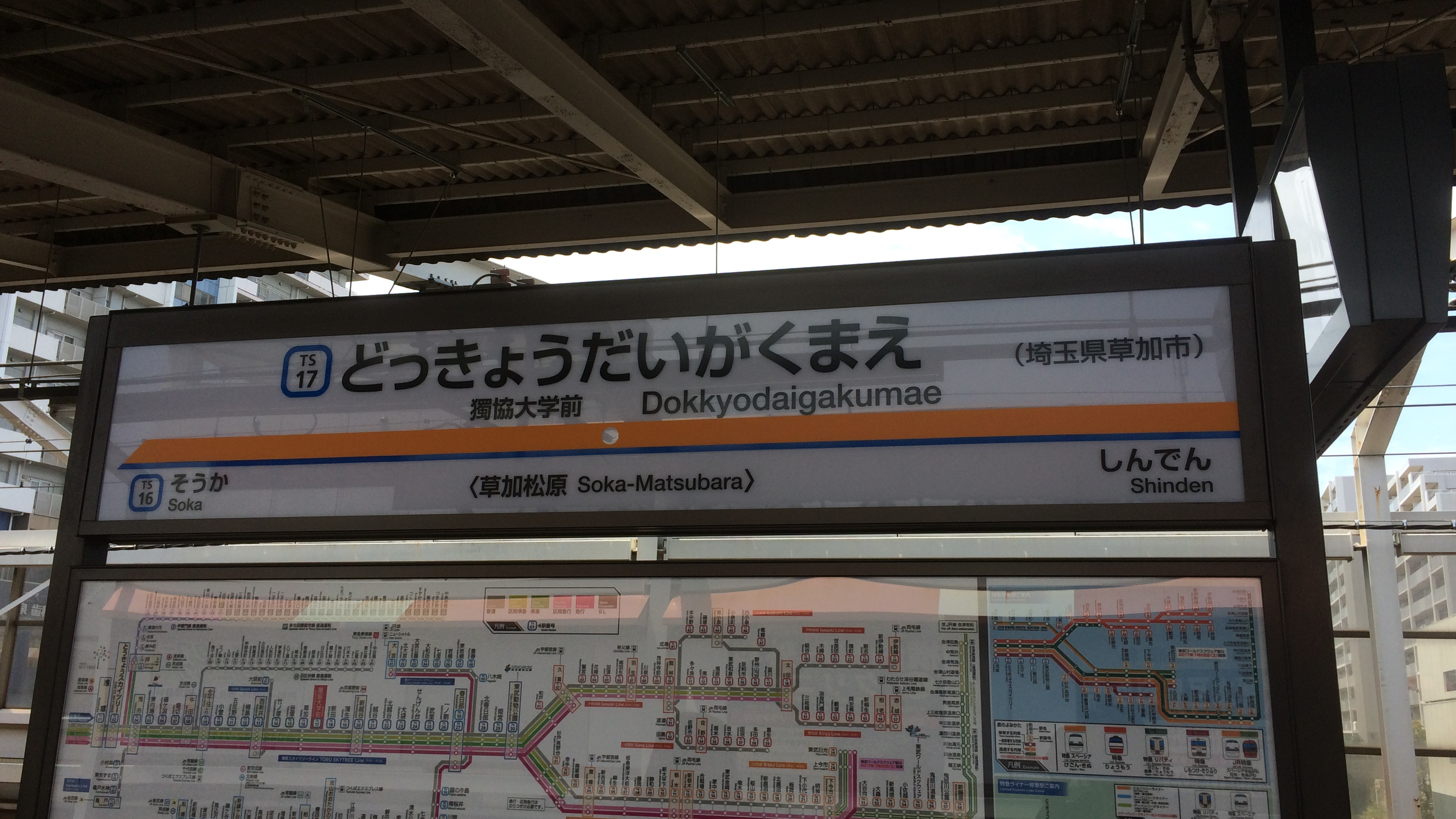
The station sign in June 2017, following renaming

== History ==
The station opened on 1 December 1962 named Matsubaradanchi Station (松原団地駅). It was rebuilt as an elevated station in 1992.

From 17 March 2012, station numbering was introduced on all Tōbu lines, with Matsubaradanchi Station becoming "TS-17".

On 1 April 2017, the station was renamed "Dokkyodaigaku-mae (Soka-Matsubara)" to reflect its closeness to Dokkyo University and also the Soka Matsubara Walking Trail.

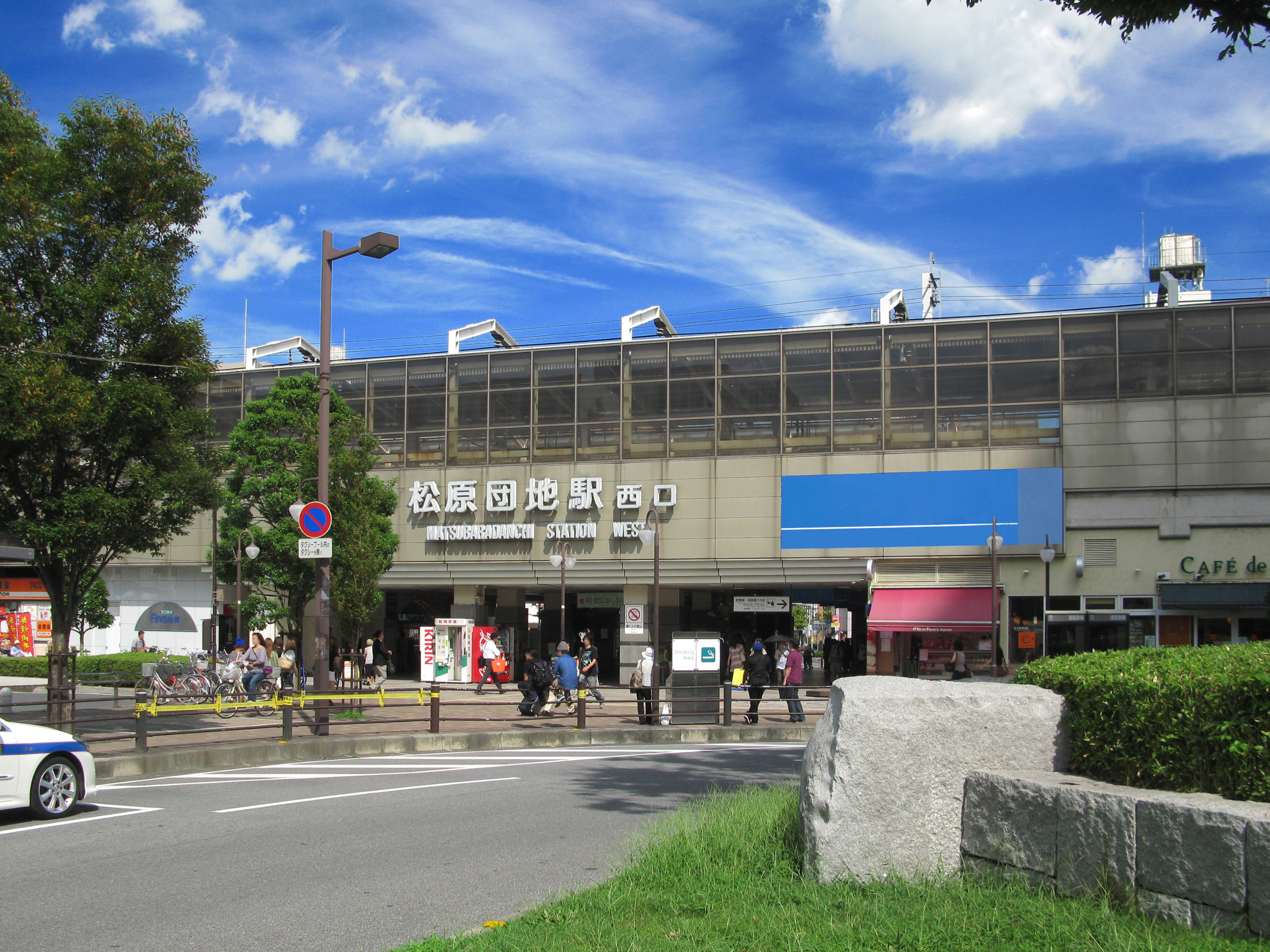
The west entrance in September 2012, before renaming

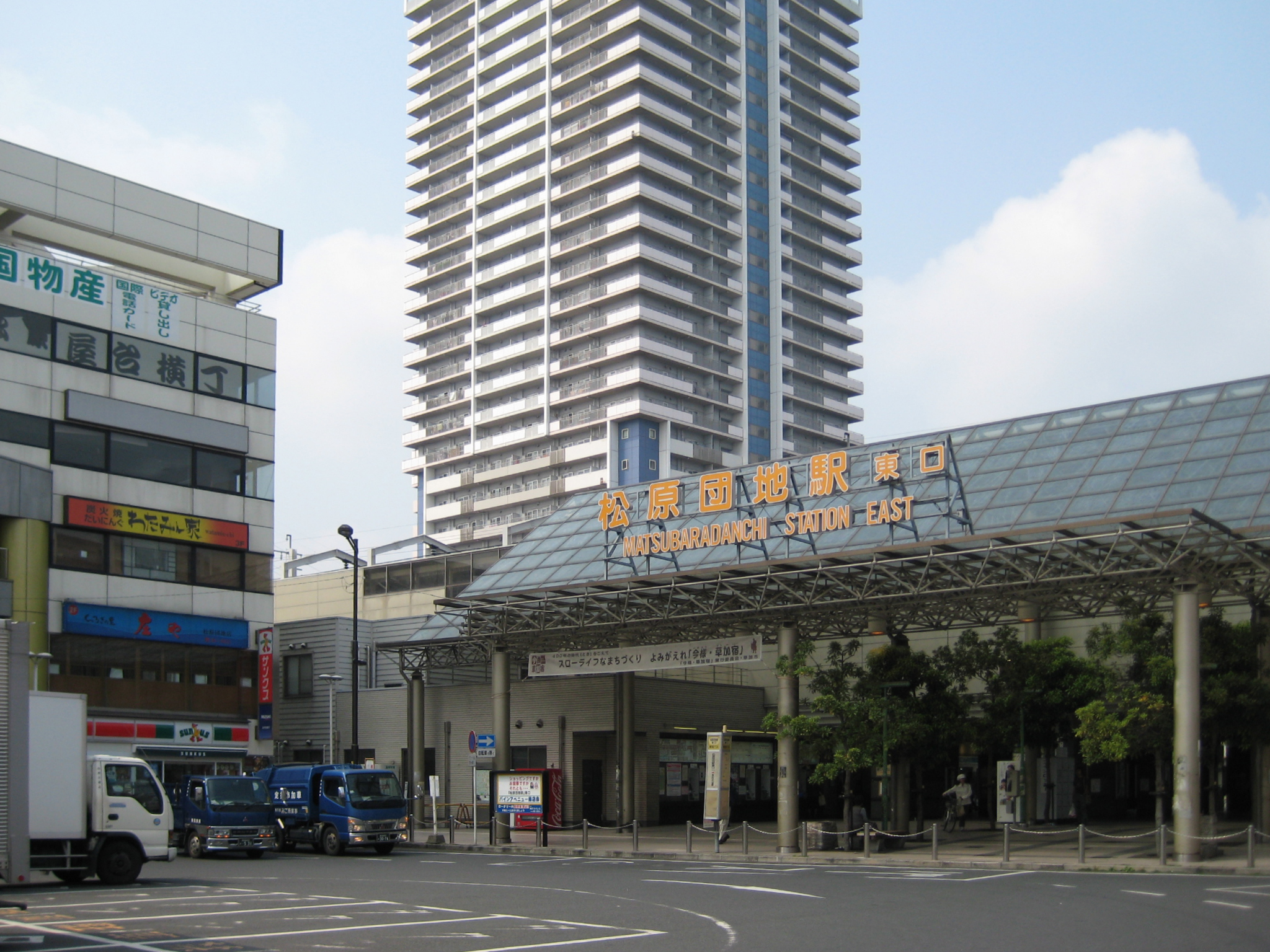
The east entrance in May 2008, before renaming

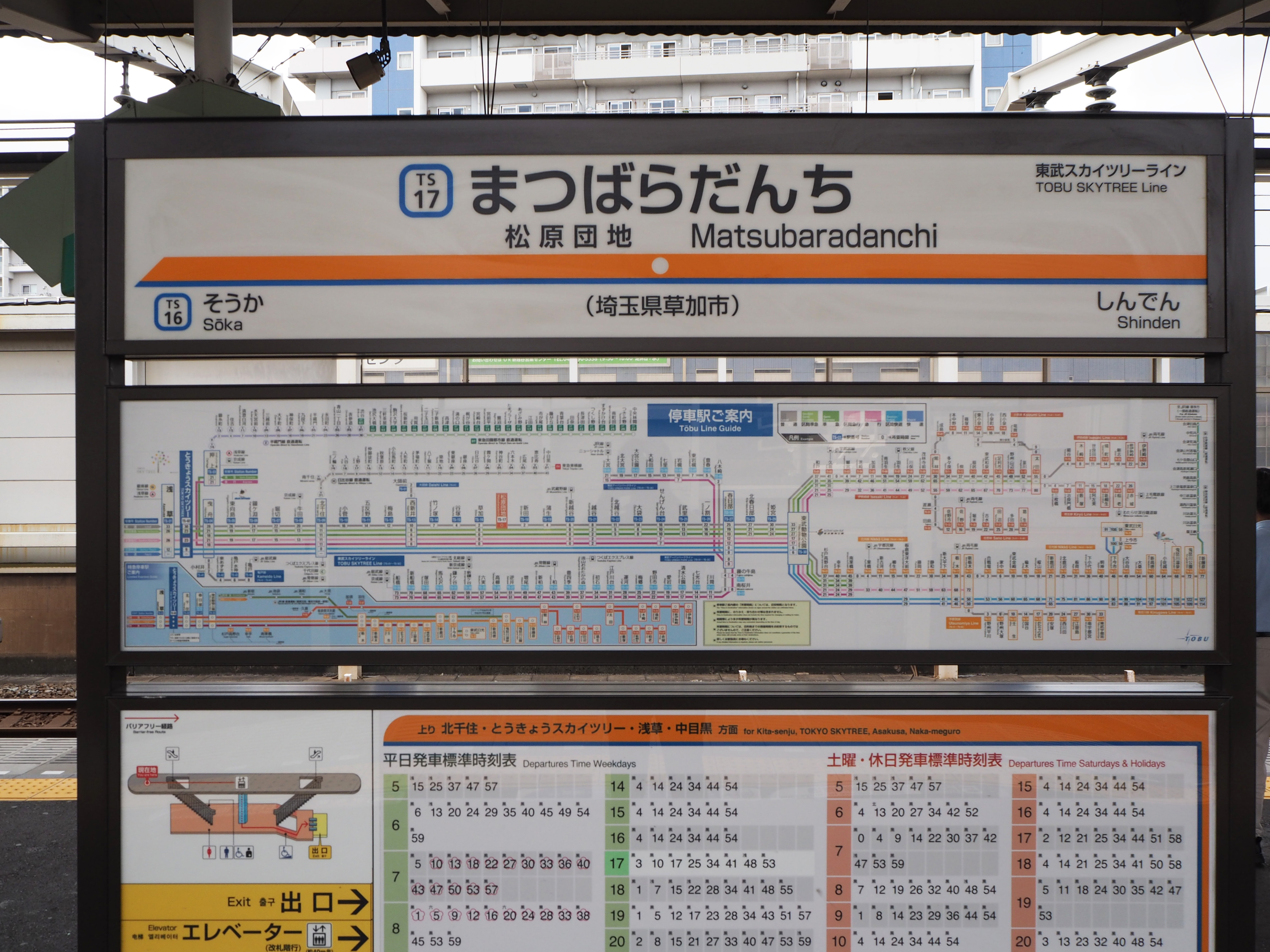
A platform sign in July 2016, before renaming

== Passenger statistics ==
In fiscal year 2024, the station had an average of 28,205 boarding passengers daily.

== Surrounding area ==
- Sōka Matsubara Housing Estate
- Dokkyo University
- Matsubaradanchi Post Office
- Saiyu Soka Hospital

== See also ==
- List of railway stations in Japan
