= Dokkyo University =

Higher education institution in Saitama Prefecture, Japan

Coordinates: 35.8399°N 139.794°E

- 獨協大学
- Motto: A University is an institution where character is developed through learning
- Type: Private
- Established: 1883
- President: Tadashi Inui
- Academic staff: 215
- Administrative staff: 153
- Undergraduates: 8892
- Postgraduates: 143
- Doctoral students: 15
- Location: Sōka, Saitama, Japan
- Colors: Blue
- Website: www.dokkyo.ac.jp/english/index_e.html

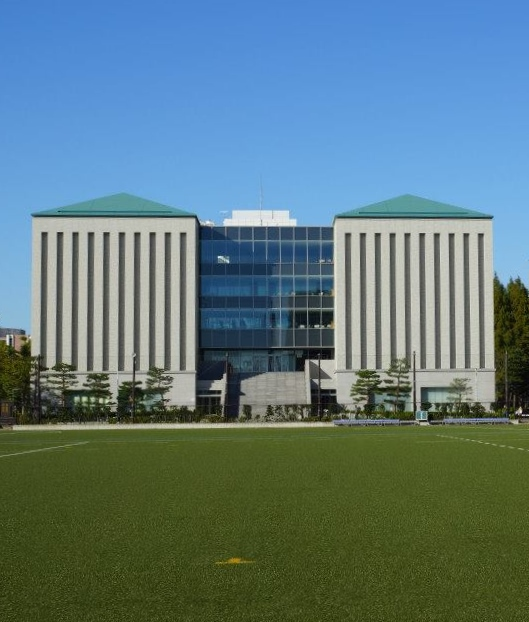
Dokkyo University East Building

Dokkyo University (獨協大学, Dokkyō Daigaku) is a private university in Sōka, Saitama, Japan, which is a liberal, co-educational institution noted for its language education programs and international exchanges. The university was founded in 1964, its roots can be traced back as early as 1881. Undergraduate admissions are selective, with an admission rate ranging from 30–40%.

== History ==
The name "Dokkyo" is the Japanese-style dual kanji-based abbreviation of Verein für deutsche Wissenschaften, or German Studies Society (獨逸學協會, Doitsu-gaku Kyōkai). What was to become today's Dokkyo University was founded on 18 September 1881 by various people, among them scholars Nishi Amane and Katō Hiroyuki, diplomats Inoue Kaoru and Aoki Shūzō and statesmen Shinagawa Yajirō and Katsura Tarō as Verein für deutsche Wissenschaften, or German Studies Society (獨逸學協會, Doitsu-gaku Kyōkai) The first chancellor was Prince Kitashirakawa Yoshihisa.

It developed into Schule des Vereins für deutsche Wissenschaften, or German Studies Society School (獨逸學協會學校, Doitsu-gaku Kyōkai Gakkō) in 1883, which opened its doors exclusively to boys in line with the custom at the time. They also founded a highly prestigious law school to study Japan's first constitution The Constitution of the Great Empire of Japan, modeled after the Prussian one with criminal codes also modeled after the German ones, but the elite law division was absorbed by the Imperial University of Tokyo Faculty of Law in 1895.

The school went through a minor negative campaign due to World War I, when Japan sided with the British Empire against the German Empire from August 1914 to November 1918, but the majority of the Japanese public was either pro-German or neutral despite Japan's position in the Anglo-Japanese Alliance. The 1920s saw its heyday when the school sent the highest number of boys into the nation's top Daiichi Kōtō Gakkō (第一高等学校, Daiichi Kōtō Gakkō) ("High School No.1") in Tokyo, popularly known as "Ichikō", which is today's Liberal Arts campus of the University of Tokyo. The collapse of the two great empires of Germany and Japan in 1945, however, rendered the elite school into a mere boys' high school of middle rank.

During the early 1960s Dokkyo School's graduate and former Education Minister Amano Teiyū (天野貞祐, Amano Teiyū) was invited to found the University with money from the school and local governments. They started their first lectures on a higher education level in April 1964.

Overview of the university's history
| Year | Event |
|---|---|
| 1883 | Doitsu-gaku Kyokai (German Association) founded |
| 1884 | Specialized subject courses (Law & Politics) established |
| 1948 | Dokkyo Junior and Senior High Schools launched under new school system |
| 1964 | Dokkyo University founded in Soka City Saitama Faculty of Foreign Languages (Department of German & English) and Faculty of Economics (Department of Economics) established Amano Teiyu assumed the position of first President. |
| 1966 | Department of Management Science added to Faculty of Economics |
| 1967 | Faculty and Department of Law established Department of French added to Faculty of Foreign Languages |
| 1977 | Graduate School of Law, Postgraduate program established |
| 1981 | Foreign Language Educational Research Center established INformation Center established |
| 1983 | 100th Anniversary of Dokkyo Gakuen (Dokkyo Educational Foundation) |
| 1984 | 20th Anniversary of Dokkyo University / International Center |
| 1986 | Graduate School of Foreign Languages Postgraduate Program established (German & English) |
| 1989 | Doctoral Program at Graduate School of Law added |
| 1990 | Master's Program at Graduate School of Foreign Language added (German & English) Doctoral Program at Graduate School of Foreign Language added (German & English) Postgradual Program at Graduate School of Economics established |
| 1992 | Doctoral Program at Graduate School of Economics added |
| 1994 | Doctoral Program at Graduate School of Foreign Language added (French) |
| 1999 | Department of Languages and Culture added to Faculty of Foreign Languages Department of International Legal Studies added to Faculty of Law Completion of 35th Anniversary Centre |
| 2003 | 120th Anniversary of Dokkyo Gakuen Graduate School of Foreign Languages One-year Master's Program in English (Focus: English Teaching) at the Graduate School of Economics established One-year Master's Program in Economics and Management Science (Focus: Information) established |
| 2004 | 40th Anniversary of Dokkyo University Dokkyo Law School (Graduate School of Law) established |
| 2005 | One-year Postgraduate Program in Japanese Teaching at the Graduate School of Foreign Languages added |
| 2007 | Faculty of International Liberal Arts established Institute of Regional Research established Institute of Human and Environmental Symbiosis Research established Legal Service Centre for Children and Local Community established |
| 2008 | Department of Policy Studies established at the Faculty of Law |
| 2009 | Department of Tourism and Transnational Studies added to Faculty of Foreign Languages |
| 2013 | Department of Economics and Sustainability added to Faculty of Economics |

== Facilities ==
The university is located in Sōka, Saitama, around 30 minutes from the Tokyo Metropolitan area. The facilities are arranged on a campus-styled property and include the Central, East and West buildings, a Student Center, Library and Research Center, a University Sports Ground and various gardens and additional buildings.

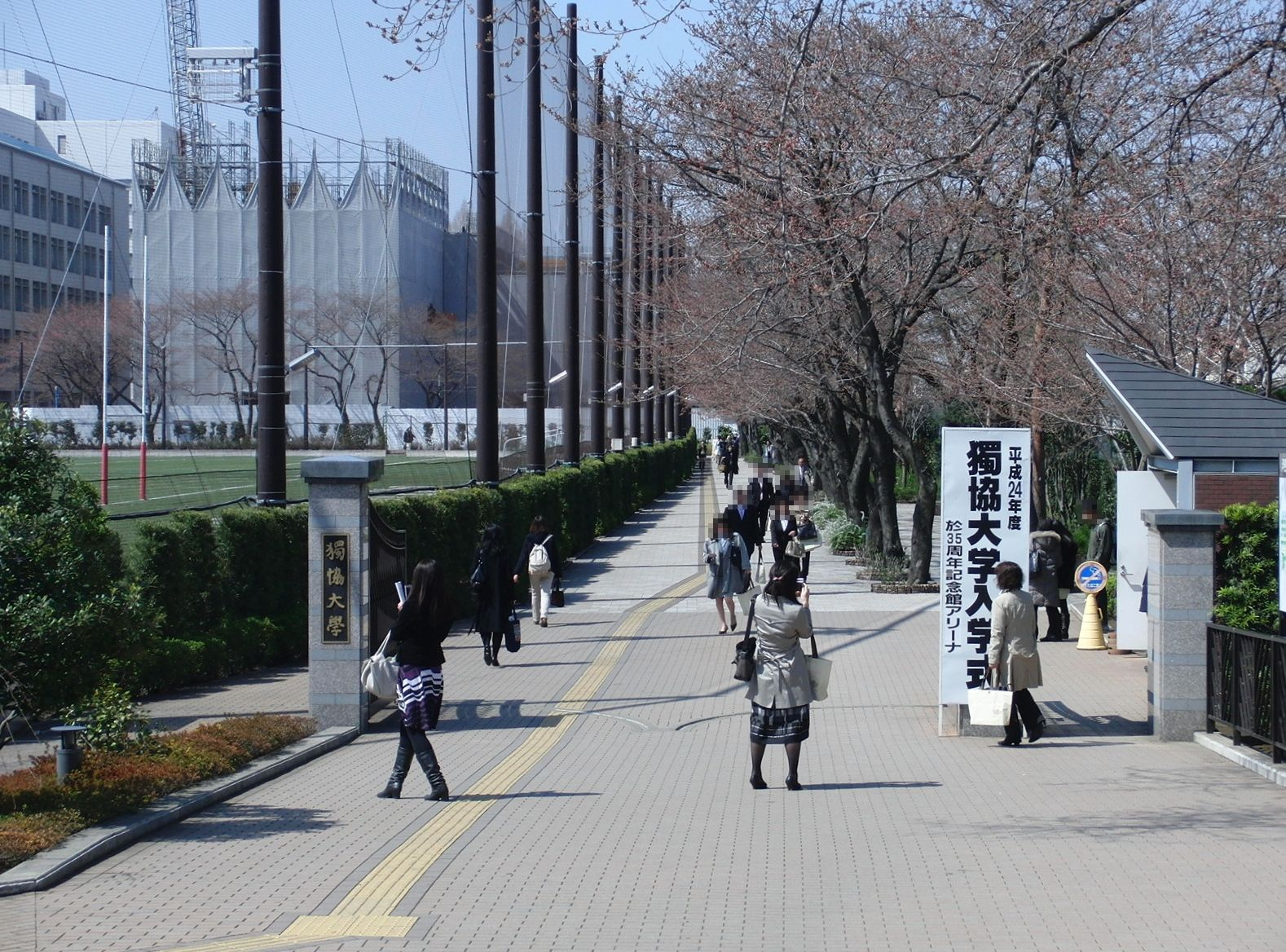
Dokkyo University East gate

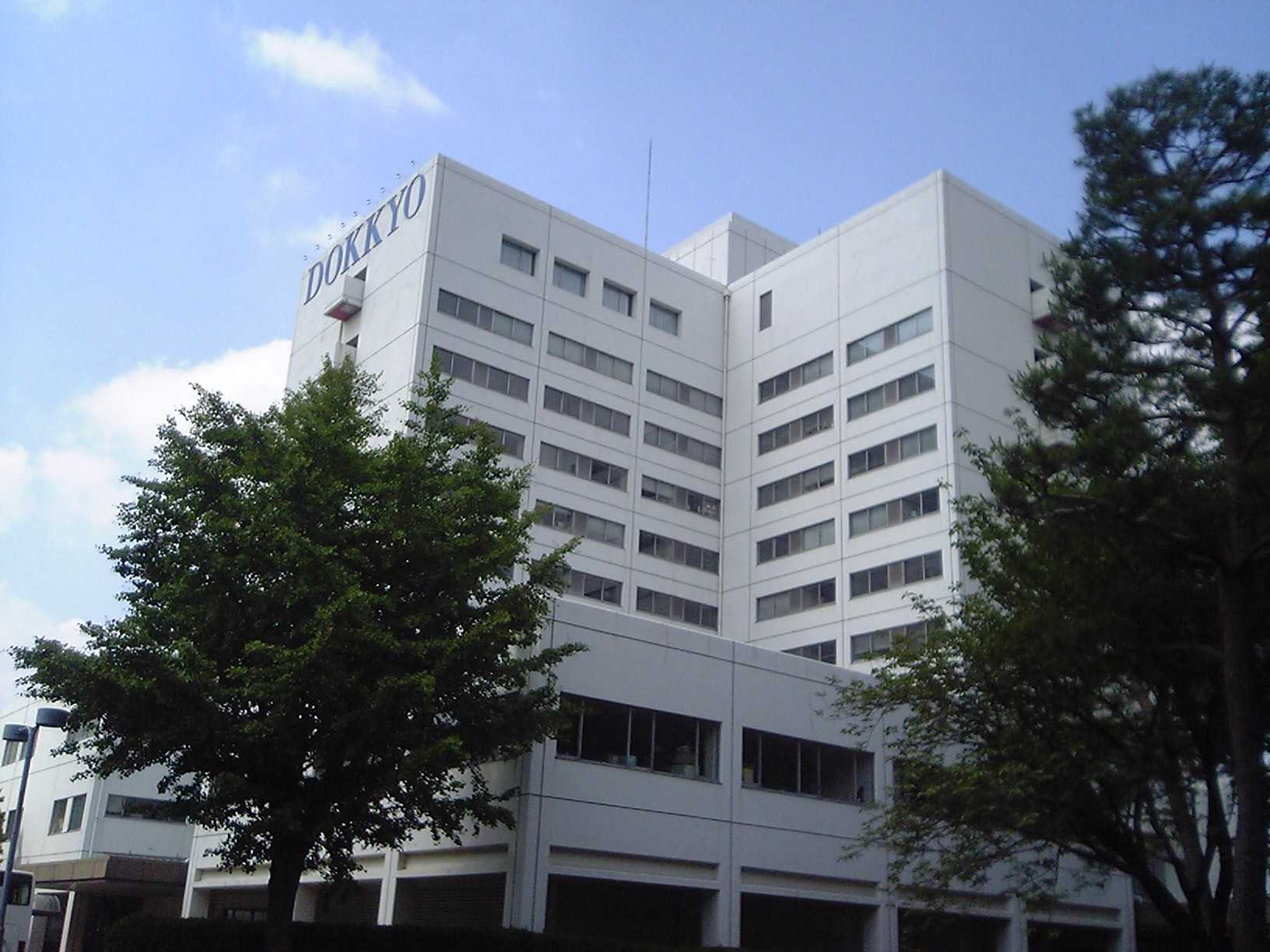
Dokkyo University Central building

The campus is situated next to the Denu river and can be accessed via the East, West, South or Ground Gate.

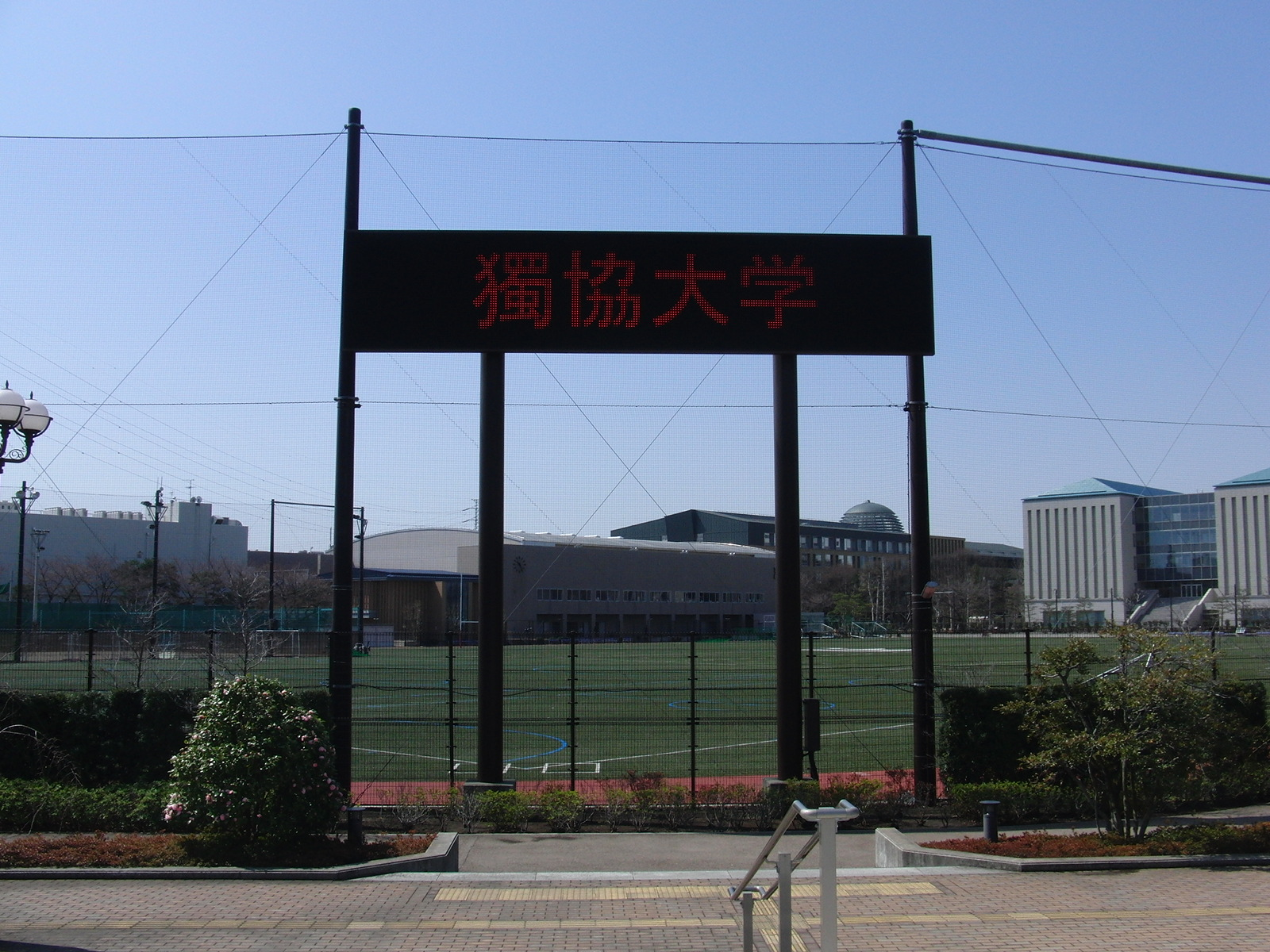
Dokkyo University South Gate, Sports Grounds and campus

The Teiyu Amano Memorial Stadium, home of the university's baseball team, is located off-campus in Koshigaya.

== Academics ==
=== Schools ===
- Dokkyo Medical University

==== Undergraduate ====
- Faculty of Foreign languages
  - Department of German
  - Department of English
  - Department of French
- Faculty of International Liberal Arts
  - Department of Interdisciplinary Studies
- Faculty of Economics
  - Department of Economics
  - Department of Management science
- Faculty of Law
  - Department of Law
  - Department of International Legal Studies
  - Department of Policy studies (since 2008)

==== Postgraduate ====
- Graduate schools
  - Graduate School of Law
  - Graduate School of Foreign Languages
  - Graduate School of Economics
- Dokkyo Law School

=== International exchanges ===
The university has an International Center, an overseas study program and various exchange agreements with universities worldwide. It also offers a Japanese Language and Culture Program for exchange students.

==== Exchange agreements ====
The university maintains student and academic exchange programs with various national and international universities.

Overview of exchange agreements
| Partner | Partnership since |
|---|---|
| Autonomous University of Barcelona | |
| Cardiff University | 1999 |
| Catholic University of Daegu | 2003 |
| Fudan University | 1999 |
| Hochschule Bremen (University of Applied Sciences Bremen) | 2006 |
| Inha University | 2006 |
| Institut d'études politiques de Lyon | 2006 |
| Konkuk University | |
| Kyung Hee University | |
| Oxford Brookes University | |
| Philipps-Universität Marburg | |
| University of Marburg | |
| University of Alabama | 1992 |
| University of Basel | |
| Université de Bourgogne (University of Burgundy) | 1985 |
| Université Catholique de l'Ouest | 1997 |
| Universität Duisburg-Essen (University of Duisburg-Essen) | 1984 |
| University of Essex | 1983 |
| University of the Fraser Valley | 2009 |
| Universidad de Guadalajara | 2012 |
| University of Illinois | 1998 |
| University of Malaga | |
| University of the Sunshine Coast | 2004 |
| University of Wollongong | 1996 |
| University of Wisconsin-Stevens Point | |
| University of Wisconsin–Madison | 2002 |
| Universität Wien (University of Vienna) | 2003 |
| Westfälische Wilhelms-Universität (University of Münster) | 2004 |
| York University | 1998 |

Overview of affiliated universities
| Country | University | Student exchange program | Academic exchange program |
|---|---|---|---|
| Australia | Southern Cross University | ✓ | ✓ |
| | University of the Sunshine Coast | ✓ | ✓ |
| | University of Wollongong | ✓ | ✓ |
| Austria | Universität Wien | ✓ | ✓ |
| China | Anyang University | ✗ | ✓ |
| | Beijing Normal University | ✓ | ✓ |
| | Chinese Academy of Social Sciences | ✗ | ✓ |
| | Dalian University of Technology | ✓ | ✓ |
| | East China Normal University | ✓ | ✓ |
| | Fudan University | ✗ | ✓ |
| Canada | University of the Fraser Valley | ✓ | ✓ |
| | York University | ✓ | ✓ |
| Czech | Masaryk University | ✓ | ✓ |
| France | Etudes Politiques de Lyon associé à l'Institut d'Asie Orientale | ✓(accept only) | ✓ |
| | Université Catholique de l'Ouest | ✓ | ✓ |
| | Université de Bourgogne | ✓(short period only) | ✓ |
| | Université Paris Panthéon-Sorbonne | ✓ | ✗ |
| Germany | Freie Universität Berlin | ✓ | ✓ |
| | Hochschule Bremen | ✓ | ✓ |
| | Martin-Luther-Universität Halle-Wittenberg | ✓ | ✓ |
| | Philipps Universität Marburg | ✓ | ✓ |
| | Stiftung Universität Hildesheim | ✓ | ✓ |
| | Universität Duisburg-Essen | ✓ | ✓ |
| | Universität Heidelberg | ✓ | ✓ |
| | Universität Regensburg | ✓ | ✓ |
| | Westfälische Wilhelms-Universität Münster | ✓ | ✓ |
| Jamaica | The University of the West Indies | ✓ | ✓ |
| Korea | Catholic University of Daegu | ✓ | ✓ |
| | Inha University | ✓ | ✓ |
| | Konkuk University | ✓ | ✓ |
| | Kyung Hee University | ✓ | ✓ |
| | Sungshin University | ✓ | ✓ |
| | Yonsei University | ✓ | ✓ |
| Mexico | Universidad de Guadalajara | ✓ | ✓ |
| Spain | Universidad de Málaga | ✓ | ✓ |
| | Universitat Autònoma de Barcelona | ✓ | ✓ |
| Switzerland | Universität Basel | ✓ | ✓ |
| Taiwan | Soochow University | ✓ | ✓ |
| Turkey | Boğaziçi University | ✓ | ✓ |
| United Kingdom | Cardiff University | ✓ | ✓ |
| | Newcastle University | ✓ | ✓ |
| | The University of Manchester | ✓ | ✓ |
| | University of Essex | ✓ | ✓ |
| | University of Leicester | ✓ | ✓ |
| United States of America | California State University, Monterey Bay | ✓ | ✓ |
| | San Francisco State University | ✓ | ✗ |
| | The University of Alabama | ✓ | ✓ |
| | University of California, Davis | ✓ | ✗ |
| | University of Illinois at Urbana-Champaign | ✗ | ✓ |
| | University of Wisconsin-Stevens Point | ✓ | ✓ |

== Rankings ==
University rankings
Global
| THE | General | 86 |

In 2018 Dokkyo University was ranked among the top 100 universities in Japan (86th) by Times Higher Education (THE).

== Student life ==
=== Athletics ===
Dokkyo offers a variety of athletic programs. The university's baseball team has been competing in the Tokyo Metropolitan Area University Baseball League since 1967.

== People ==
=== Alumni ===
Notable alumni from Dokkyo university include:

- Jun Enomoto, Japanese football player
- Hiroki Kamemoto, Japanese musician
- Rie Furuse, Japanese singer
- Katsuko Nishimoto, Japanese politician
- Atsuko Okamoto, Japanese actress
- Koichiro Okuma, Japanese martial artist
- Tomorowo Taguchi, Japanese actor
- Sōichirō Takashima, Japanese politician
- Toru Toida, Japanese politician
- Yumi Yoshiyuki, Japanese film director

== See also ==
- Dokkyodaigakumae Station
- Dokkyo Medical University
- Himeji Dokkyo University
