= Dokkyo Medical University =

University in Tochigi Prefecture, Japan

Coordinates: 36°28′22.5″N 139°49′24.4″E

- 獨協医科大学
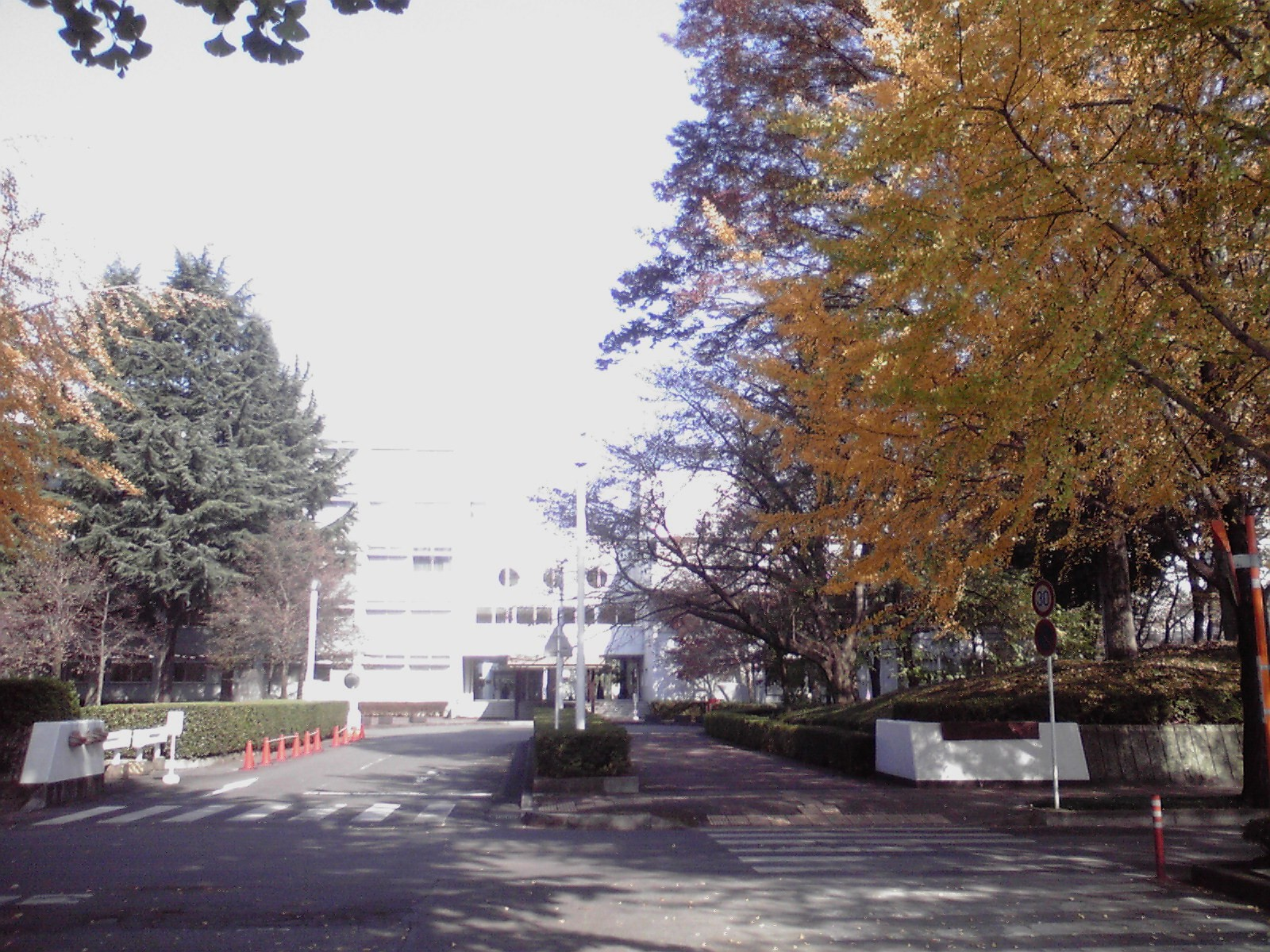
- Dokkyo Medical University 2009
- Former names: Dokkyo University School of Medicine
- Established: 1973
- Students: 631
- Location: Mibu, Tochigi, Japan
- Website: http://www.dokkyomed.ac.jp/

Dokkyo Medical University (獨協医科大学, Dokkyō ika daigaku) is a private university in Mibu, Tochigi, Japan, established in 1973.

Dokkyo University is located in the town of Mibu, in Tochigi Prefecture, about 1.5 hours north of Tokyo by train.

== History ==
Dokkyo Medical University is a part of Dokkyo Group of Academic Institutions (Dokkyo Gakuen). Dokkyo Gakuen was established in Tokyo in 1883 as Doitsugaku Kyokai Gakko under the sponsorship of Nishi Amane, Yamagata Aritomo, and Katsura Taro. Doitsugaku Kyokai Gakko later became Dokkyo Gakuen, which was founded by Teiyu Amamo, and Minato Seki. Dokkyo Gakuen re-established junior and senior high schools in 1948. In 1964, Dokkyo Gakuen established Dokkyo University in Saitama for its 80-year anniversary. Subsequently, Dokkyo Gakuen established a medical school, Dokkyo Medical University in 1973 in Mibu, Tochigi. Its University Hospital, Saitama Medical Center, and Nikko Medical Center are now the biggest medical complex in northern area of Kanto.

== Organization of Dokkyo Medical University ==
=== Undergraduate programs ===
- School of Medicine (B.S.): Department of Medicine
- School of Nursing (B.S.): Department of Nursing

=== Graduate program ===
- Graduate School of Medicine (Ph.D. in Medicine)
- Graduate School of Nursing (Ph.D. in Nursing)
- Graduate Program of Midwifery

=== Hospitals ===
- Dokkyo University Hospital
- Saitama Medical Center (formerly Koshigaya Hospital)
- Nikko Medical Center

=== Nursing Schools ===
- Nursing School Affiliated to Dokkyo Medical University
- Misato Nursing School Affiliated to Dokkyo Medical University

== Student and staff numbers ==
=== Students ===
Graduate School of Medicine: 165

Graduate School of Nursing: 25

School of Medicine: 747

School of Nursing: 405

Graduate School of Midwifery: 10

Nursing School Affiliated to DMU: 303

Misato Nursing School Affiliated to DMU: 132

=== Faculty ===
- Professors: 74
- Associate professors: 88
- Full-time instructors: 150

== Organization of Dokkyo Gakuen ==
- Dokkyo Medical University
- Dokkyo University
- Himeji Dokkyo University
- Dokkyo Junior High School & Senior High School
- Dokkyo Saitama Junior High School & Senior High School
