= Sōichirō Takashima =

Japanese politician

- 高島 宗一郎
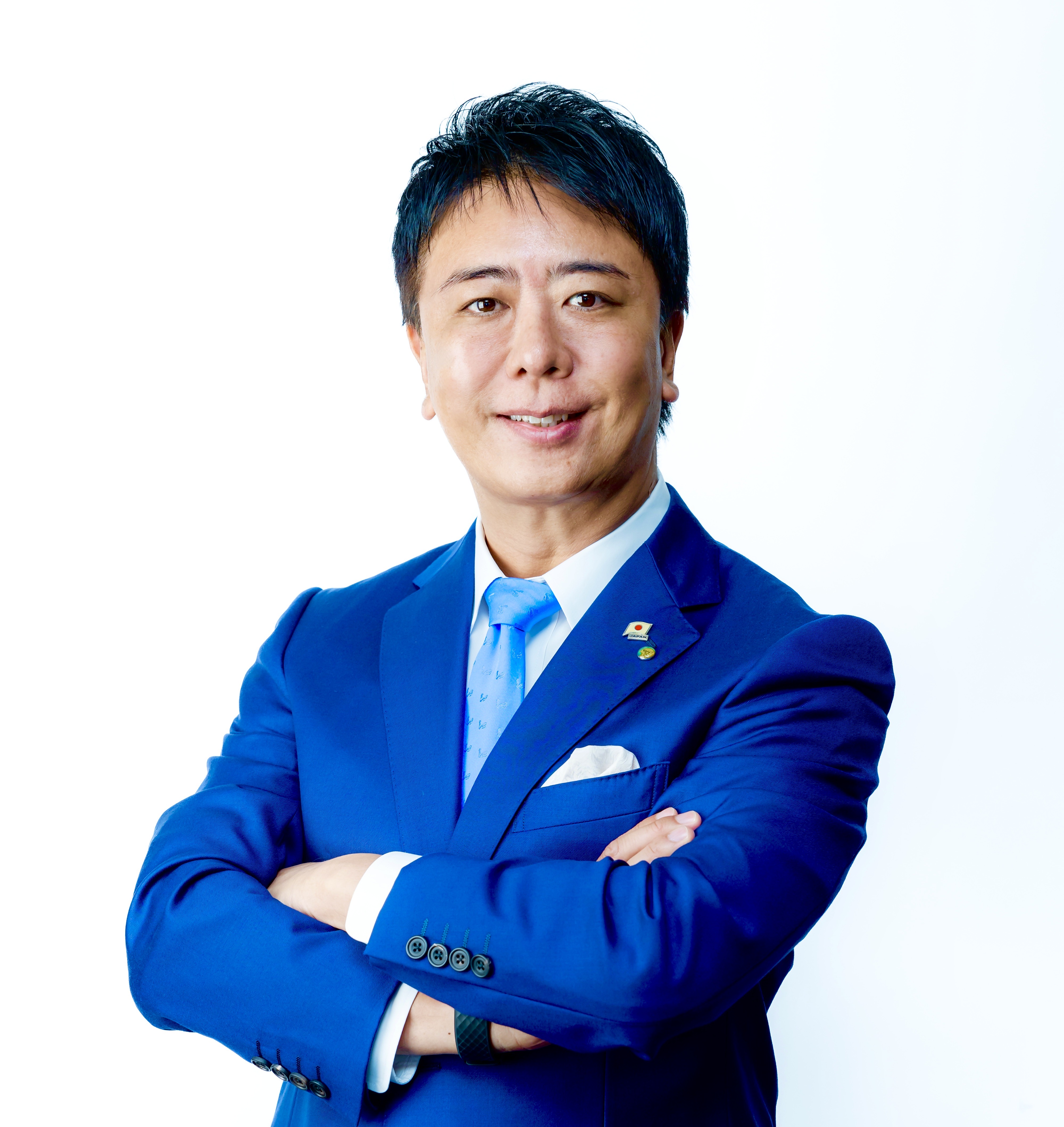
- Takashima in 2024

Mayor of Fukuoka
- Incumbent
- Assumed office 7 December 2010
- Preceded by: Hiroshi Yoshida

Personal details
- Born: 1 November 1974 (age 51) Ōita, Ōita, Japan
- Party: Independent
- Education: Dokkyo University

Sōichirō Takashima (高島 宗一郎, Takashima Sōichirō) is a Japanese politician who has been mayor of the city of Fukuoka since 2010.

== Early life ==
Born in 1974, he worked as a TV presenter after graduating from university, presenting morning news programs and the like.

== Political career ==
In 2010, he quit his job as a TV presenter and at the age of 36 ran for and won the Fukuoka City Mayor election. He was the youngest mayor in the history of Fukuoka City government. Fukuoka City is the economic center of Kyushu, located in the west of Japan. It has the fifth largest population in the country.

In 2014, 2018, and 2022, he won re-election with the largest number of votes in history, each time expanding his support base. He is currently in his fourth term.

=== Political achievements ===
In March 2014, he won the first national strategic special zone in Japan to support startups. He then achieved a series of deregulation and institutional reforms, including the startup visa. He also strongly drove the Japanese startup scene with a number of measures and movements. As a result, Fukuoka City has become the city with the highest rate of business start-ups in Japan for several consecutive years.

The “Tenjin Big Bang” project, which he came up with, is a huge project to rebuild 70 buildings in the city center by 2026. This has attracted attention as a groundbreaking method that does not use tax money but instead uses deregulation to guide the project. His proactive economic policies, such as promoting the MICE and content industries, led Fukuoka City to record its highest tax revenue for seven consecutive years, the only ordinance-designated city to do so.

At the same time, he worked on local government management and administrative and fiscal reform that did not rely on debt.

In 12 years, he reduced the balance of municipal bonds by approximately 427.3 billion yen.

In 2017, he became the first mayor in Japan to be invited to the World Economic Forum (Davos, Switzerland).

He was appointed as a member of the Japanese Government's Council for the Rebirth of School Education and the Temporary Digital Administrative Investigation Committee. He focuses his activities on moving the government from the local government frontline.

The results of a survey on the level of trust in Fukuoka City government rose more than twice the level before he took office, with 87.3% of respondents saying they trusted the city government in 2021.

As a leader of Japan's representative reformist mayors, he is working to develop the next generation of leaders by holding study sessions for young mayors and governors across the country, regardless of political affiliation.
