= Sōka =

Sōka 草加市
- Special city
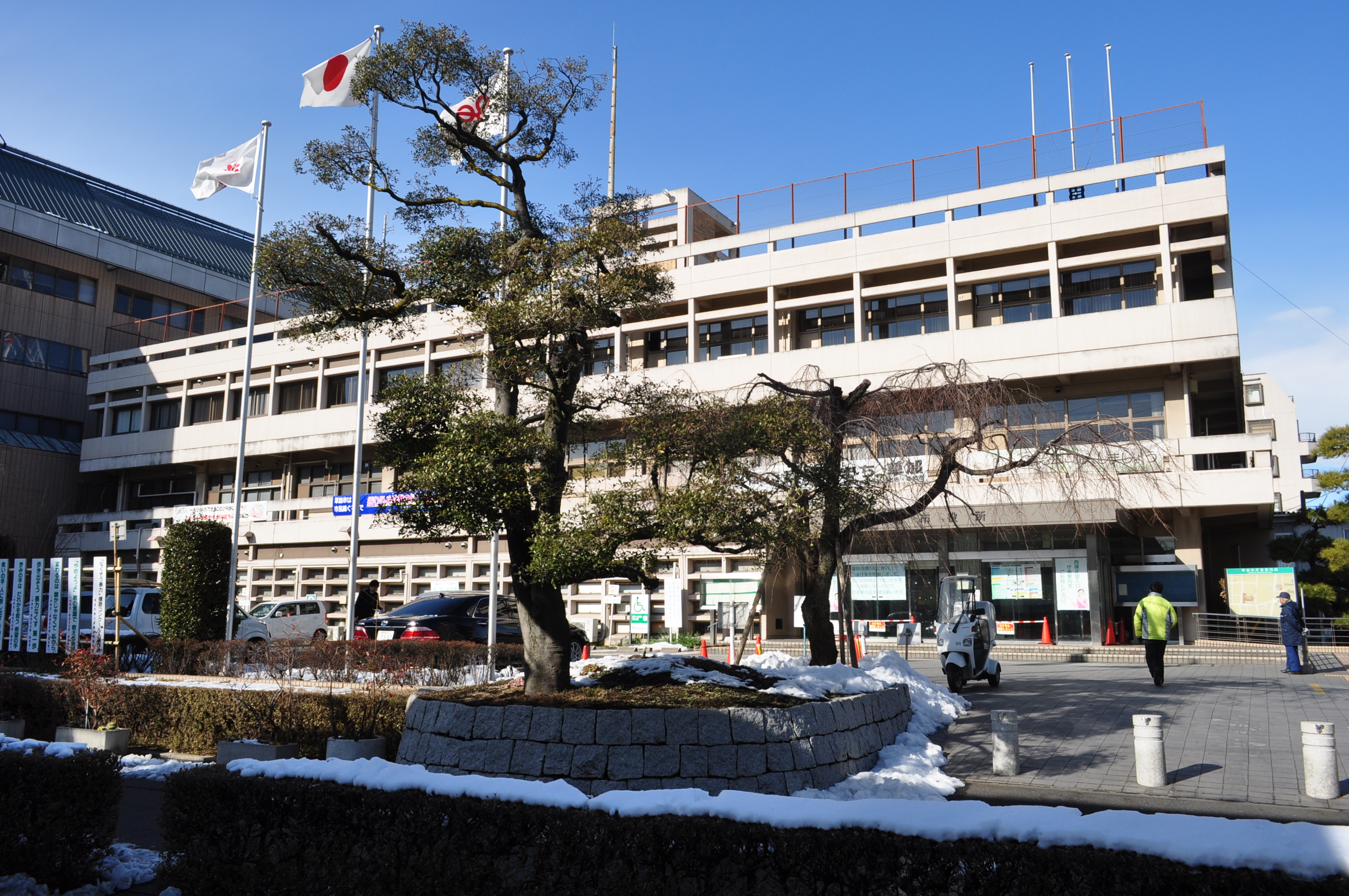
- Sōka City office

- Flag Seal

- Location of Sōka in Saitama Prefecture

- Location of Sōka in Japan
- Coordinates: 35°49′31.4″N 139°48′19.2″E
- Country: Japan
- Region: Kantō
- Prefecture: Saitama
- First official recorded: mid 3rd century AD (official)
- Town settled: April 1, 1889
- City settled: November 1, 1958

Government
  - Mayor: Yuriko Yamakawa (from October 2022)

Area
  - Total: 27.46 km^{2} (10.60 sq mi)

Population (February 2021)
  - Total: 249,645
  - Density: 9,091/km^{2} (23,550/sq mi)
- Time zone: UTC+9 (Japan Standard Time)
- Tree: Pinus
- Flower: Chrysanthemum
- Phone number: 048-922-0151
- Address: 1-1-1 Takasago, Soka-shi, Saitama-ken 840-8550
- Website: Official website

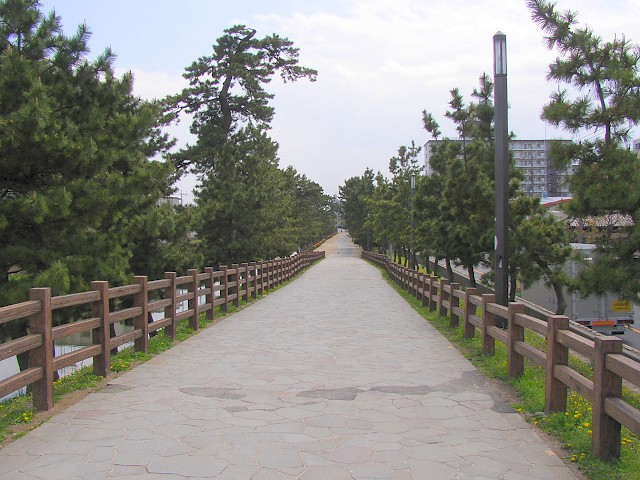
Sōka Matsubara

Sōka (草加市, Sōka-shi) is a city in Saitama Prefecture, Japan. As of 1 February 2021, the city had an estimated population of 249,645 in 118,129 households and a population density of 9100 persons per km^{2}. The total area of the city is 27.46 square kilometres (10.60 sq mi).

== Geography ==
Sōka is situated in the southeast corner of Saitama Prefecture approximately 30 kilometers away from downtown Tokyo. It is surrounded to the east by the cities of Yashio, Misato and Yoshikawa, and to the west by Kawaguchi. To the north is Koshigaya and to the south Adachi Ward of Metropolitan Tokyo.The city is in the center of the Kanto Plain and is mostly lowland with an elevation of only three meters above sea level. The Ayase River flows through the city, which was subject to frequent flooding despite various flood control measures taken since the Edo Period.

Sōka was once a peaceful agricultural area surrounded by water and greenery, but as a result of urbanization, the once abundant greenery and clean water was adversely affected. Now, Sōka is promoting a "town of greenery and water based on history and the natural features of the area". Creation of areas of greenery reflecting the changes of the four seasons, and the restoration of waterways and environs is being advanced.

=== Surrounding municipalities ===
- Saitama Prefecture
  - Koshigaya
  - Kawaguchi
  - Misato
  - Yashio
  - Yoshikawa
- Tokyo
  - Adachi

=== Climate ===
Sōka has a humid subtropical climate (Köppen Cfa) characterized by warm summers and cool winters with light to no snowfall. The average annual temperature in Sōka is 14.9 °C. The average annual rainfall is 1482 mm with September as the wettest month. The temperatures are highest on average in August, at around 26.5 °C, and lowest in January, at around 3.4 °C.

== Demographics ==
Per Japanese census data, the population of Sōka has increased rapidly from the 1960s due to the construction of new towns and large-scale public housing complexes, together with the completion of highways and rail lines providing access to downtown Tokyo.

Historical population
Year	Pop.	±%
1960	38,533	—
1970	123,269	+219.9%
1980	186,618	+51.4%
1990	206,132	+10.5%
2000	225,018	+9.2%
2010	243,855	+8.4%
2020	248,304	+1.8%

== History ==
The area of Sōka has been settled since at least the late Yayoi to early Kofun period, as evidenced by numerous burial mounds from 250-400 AD found within the city borders. In the Nara period, it became part of Musashi Province. In the Kamakura period, per the Azuma Kagami, large areas were under control of Tsurugaoka Hachiman-gu in Kamakura. The name "Sōka" first appears in historical documents in 1573. During the Edo period, the area was tenryo territory under the direct control of the Tokugawa shogunate and Sōka-shuku developed as a post station on the Nikkō Kaidō highway from 1630. Following the Meiji restoration, the area became part of Kitaadachi District, Saitama and Sōka Town was created with the establishment of the modern municipalities system on April 1, 1889.

Sōka annexed the neighboring villages of Yatsuka and Shinden on January 1, 1955, followed by the village of Kawayanagi on August 1, 1955. On November 1, 1955, Sōka was elevated to city status. Following this, rapid population expansion and urbanization took hold due to strong economic growth which was fueled by its proximity to Tokyo. The city was proclaimed a tokureishi on April 1, 2004 with increased local autonomy.

== Government ==
Sōka has a mayor-council form of government with a directly elected mayor and a unicameral city council of 28 members. Sōka contributes three members to the Saitama Prefectural Assembly. In terms of national politics, the city is part of Saitama 3rd district of the lower house of the Diet of Japan.

== Economy ==
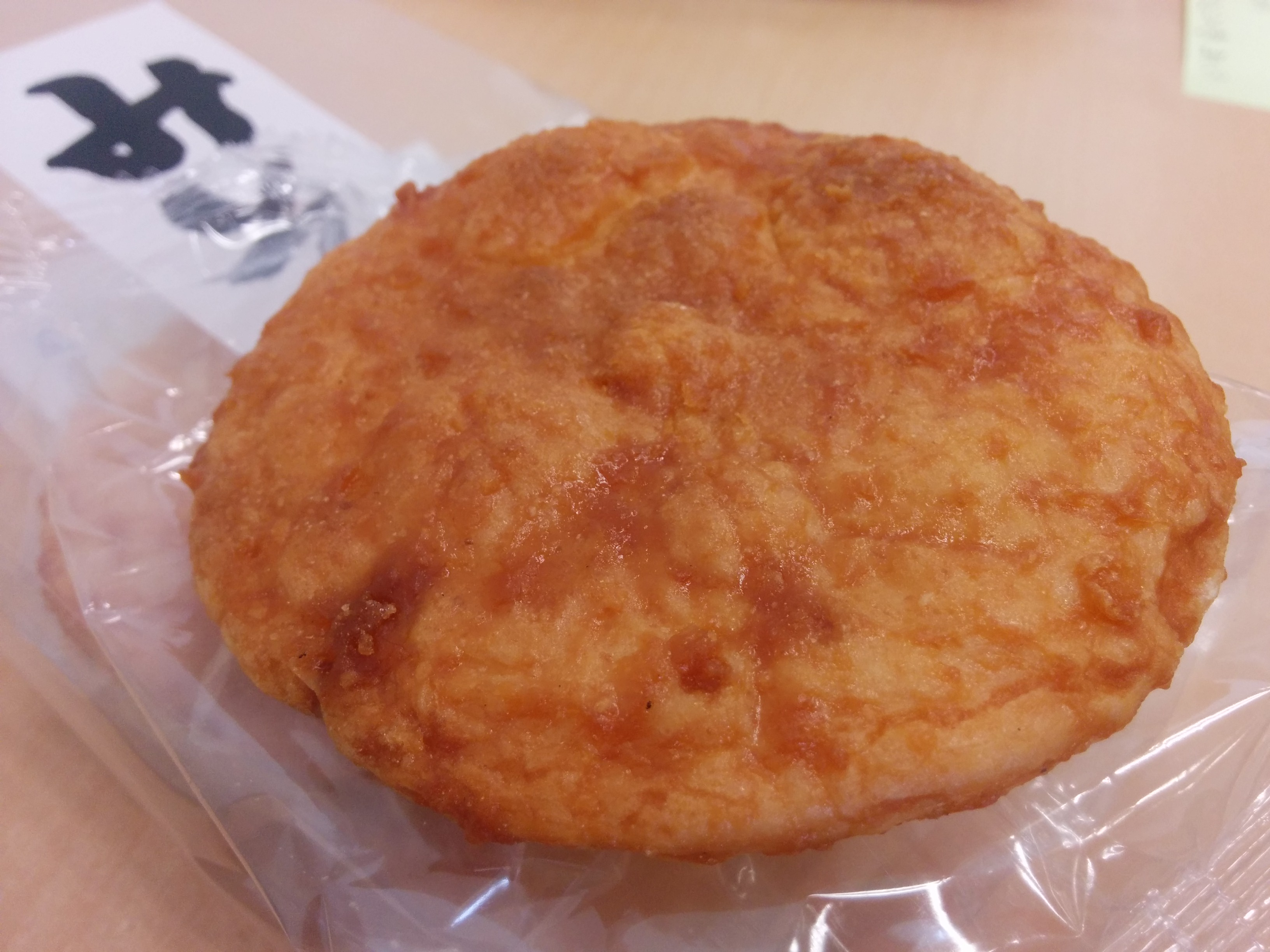
Miso senbei from Sōka

Sōka traditionally is known for its rice cracker, the Sōka senbei. However, agriculture and food processing form a minor portion of the local economy, which is heavily industrialized. The city is increasingly becoming a commuter town for Tokyo Metropolis.

== Education ==
- Dokkyo University
- Sōka has 21 public elementary schools and 11 public middle schools operated by the city government, and four public high schools operated by the Saitama Prefectural Board of Education. In addition, the prefecture also operates one special education school for the handicapped.

== Transportation ==
=== Railway ===
Tōbu Railway - Tobu Skytree Line

- Yatsuka - Sōka - Dokkyodaigakumae - Shinden

=== Highway ===
- Tokyo Gaikan Expressway
- National Route 4
- National Route 298

== Sister cities ==
Sōka is twinned with:

- Carson, California, United States, since November 19, 1985
- Shōwa, Fukushima, Japan, friendship city since 1985
- Anyang, Henan, China, since November 1, 1988

== Local attractions ==
- Sōka Matsubara

== Notable people from Sōka ==
- Kazuki Hashimoto, wrestler
- Yōko Honna, voice actress
- Hiroshi Imai, politician
- Kenta Kobayashi, wrestler
- Yumi Morio, actress
- Tatsuya Yamaguchi, musician
