= Katsuko Nishimoto =

Japanese politician (1950–2025)

- 西本 勝子

Member of the House of Representatives
- In office 11 September 2005 – 21 July 2009
- Preceded by: Hajime Morita
- Succeeded by: Multi-member district
- Constituency: Shikoku PR

Member of the Hidaka Village Council
- In office 1995–2005

Personal details
- Born: 1 April 1950 Hidaka, Kōchi, Japan
- Died: 2 February 2025 (aged 74)
- Party: Liberal Democratic
- Education: Dokkyo University

Katsuko Nishimoto (西本 勝子, Nishimoto Katsuko; 1 April 1950 – 2 February 2025) was a Japanese politician of the Liberal Democratic Party (LDP), who was a member of the House of Representatives in the Diet (national legislature).

== Life and career ==
Nishimoto was born on 1 April 1950, and grew up in Takaoka District, Kōchi. She graduated from Dokkyo University. Nishimoto was elected to the village council of Hidaka, Kōchi for the first time in 1995 and to the Diet for the first time in 2005. She died on 2 February 2025, at the age of 74.

== Sources ==
- 政治家情報 〜西本 勝子〜. JANJAN ザ･選挙 (in Japanese).
