= Sōka Station =

Railway station in Sōka, Saitama Prefecture, Japan

TS16 Sōka Station 草加駅
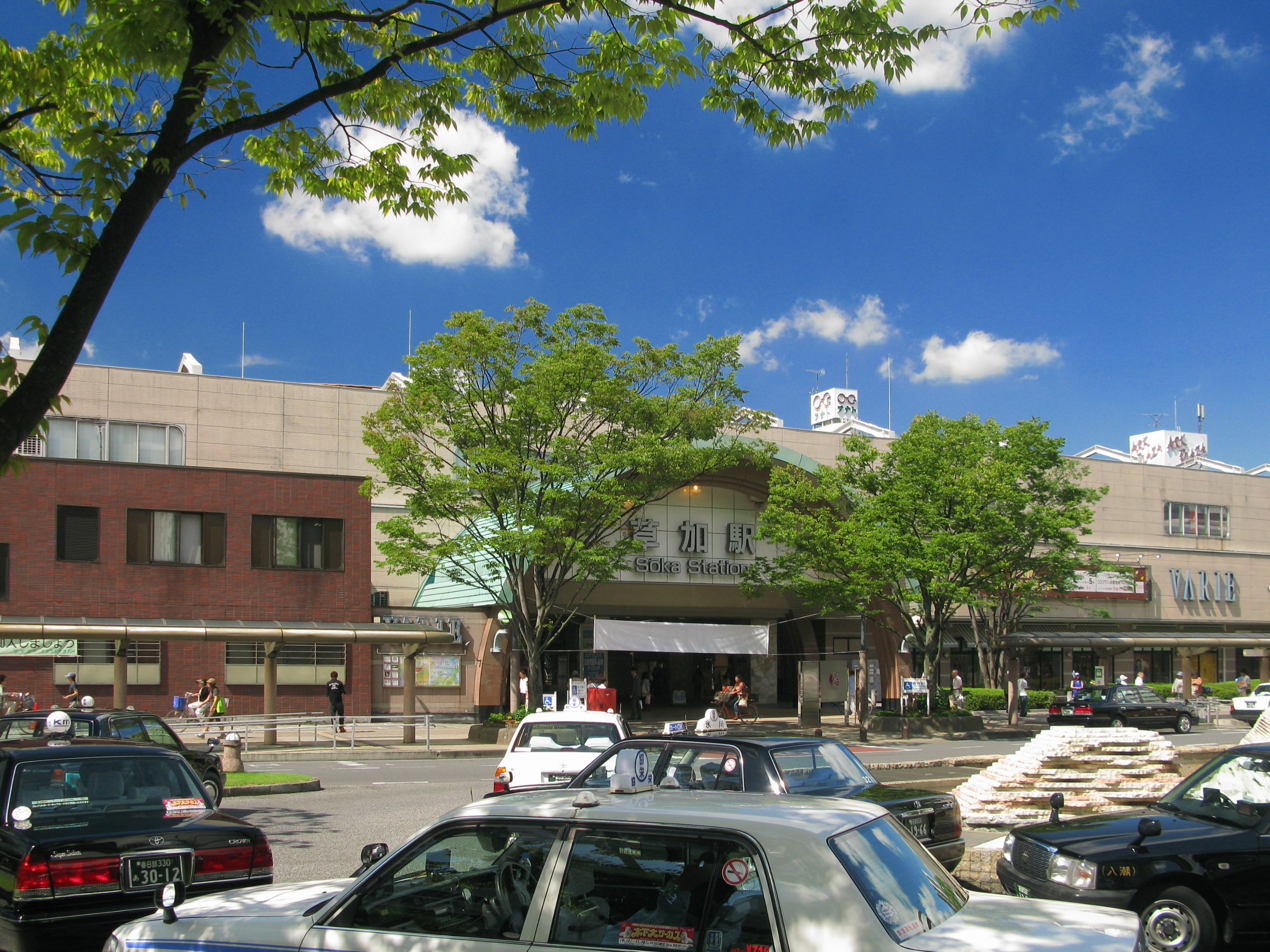
- The east side of Sōka Station in September 2012

General information
- Location: 2 Takasago, Sōka-shi, Saitama-ken 340-0034; Japan
- Coordinates: 35.8286°N 139.8041°E
- Operator: Tōbu Railway
- Line: Tōbu Skytree Line
- Distance: 17.5 km from Asakusa
- Platforms: 2 island platforms
- Tracks: 6

Other information
- Station code: TS-16
- Website: Official website

History
- Opened: 27 August 1899
- Rebuilt: 1988

Passengers
- FY2024: 41,216 daily boardings

Services
Preceding station	Tobu Railway	Following station
Nishiarai TS13 towards Oshiage	Tobu Skytree Line Express	Shin-Koshigaya TS20 towards Tōbu-Dōbutsu-Kōen
Nishiarai TS13 towards Asakusa	Tobu Skytree Line Section Express	Shin-Koshigaya TS20 towards Tōbu-Dōbutsu-Kōen
Nishiarai TS13 towards Oshiage	Tobu Skytree Line Semi Express	Shin-Koshigaya TS20 towards Tōbu-Dōbutsu-Kōen
Nishiarai TS13 towards Asakusa	Tobu Skytree Line Section Semi Express	Shin-Koshigaya TS20 towards Tōbu-Dōbutsu-Kōen
Yatsuka TS15 towards Asakusa	Tobu Skytree Line Local	Dokkyodaigakumae TS17 towards Tōbu-Dōbutsu-Kōen
Location
- Location within Saitama Prefecture Location within Japan

Sōka Station (草加駅, Sōka-eki) is a passenger railway station located in the city of Sōka, Saitama, Japan, operated by the private railway operator Tōbu Railway. It is one stop away from the border between Tokyo and Saitama Prefecture.

== Line ==
Sōka Station is served by the Tōbu Skytree Line, and is 17.5 kilometers from the Tokyo terminus of the line at Asakusa Station.

== Station layout ==
The station has two elevated island platforms with four tracks abutting the platforms, going in opposite directions. The station building is located underneath the platforms. Tracks one and six are used by non-stop trains and are not served by platforms, so the platform numbering starts with platform 2. Local trains use tracks 3 and 4 in their respective drections, whereas Express and Semi-Express trains use tracks 2 and 5.

=== Platforms ===
2	Tōbu Skytree Line	for Kita-Senju, Hikifune, and Asakusa; Tokyo Metro Hanzomon Line for Shibuya; Tokyu Den-en-toshi Line for Chūō-rinkan
3	Tōbu Skytree Line	for Kita-Senju, Hikifune, and Asakusa; Tokyo Metro Hibiya Line for Ueno and Naka-meguro
4	Tōbu Skytree Line	for Kita-Koshigaya, Kasukabe, and Tōbu-Dōbutsu-Kōen; Tobu Nikko Line for Minami-Kurihashi
5	Tōbu Skytree Line	for Kasukabe and Tōbu-Dōbutsu-Kōen; Tobu Isesaki Line for Kuki and Tatebayashi; Tōbu Nikkō Line for Minami-Kurihashi

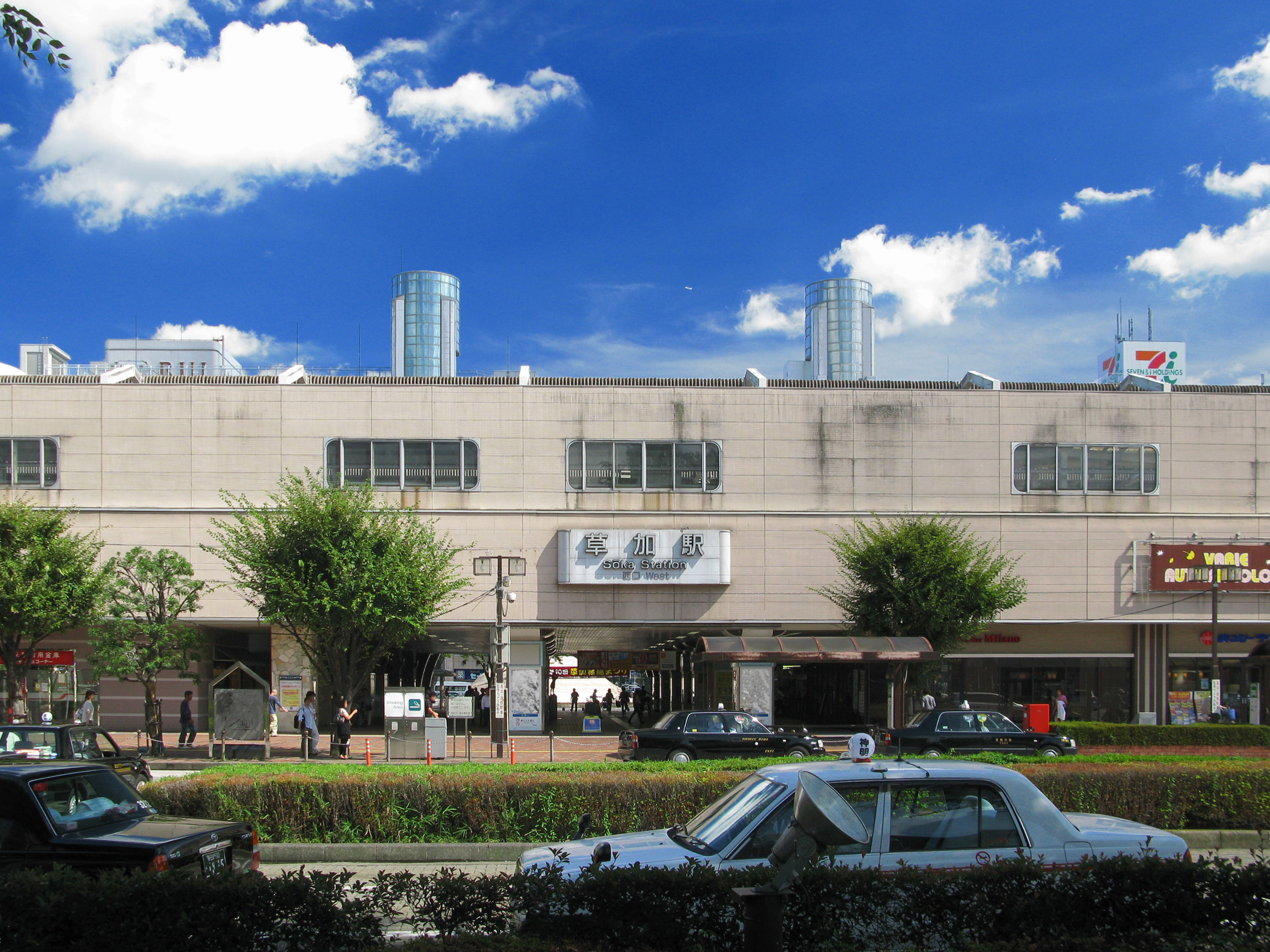
The west entrance in September 2012

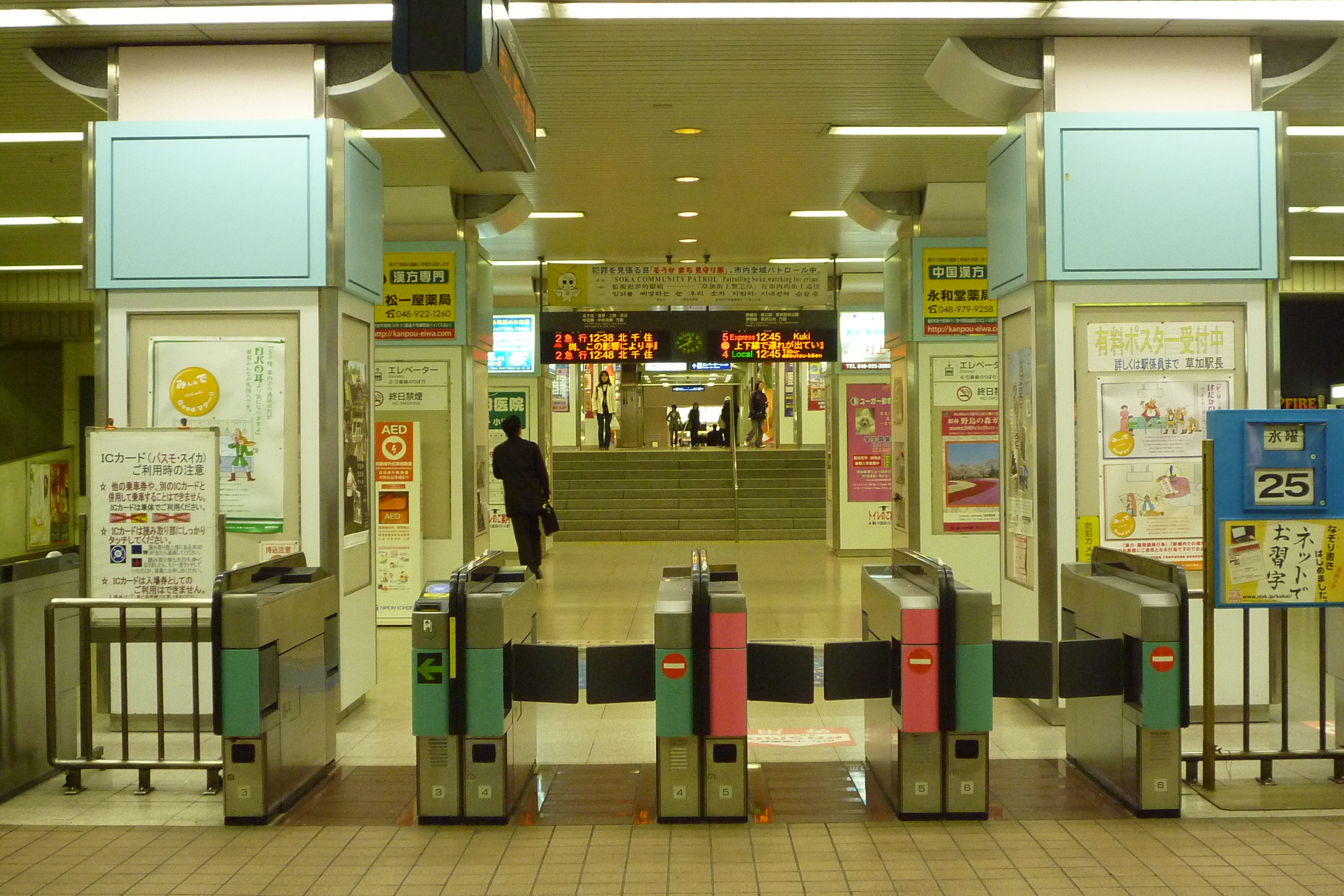
The ticket barriers in March 2009

== History ==
The station opened on 27 August 1899. It was rebuilt as an elevated station, completed on 9 August 1988.

From 17 March 2012, station numbering was introduced on all Tōbu lines, with Sōka Station becoming "TS-16".

== Passenger statistics ==
In fiscal 2024, the station was used by an average of 41,216 passengers daily (boarding passengers only).

== Surrounding area ==
- Sōka City Hall
- Sōka Post Office

== See also ==
- List of railway stations in Japan
