= Soka (Bithynia) =

Inland town of ancient Bithynia

Coordinates: 40°52′41″N 29°52′14″E

Soka was an inland town of ancient Bithynia inhabited during Roman times. Its name is not used by ancient authors, but is inferred from epigraphic and other evidence.

Its site is located near Kaşıkçı in Kocaeli Province, Asiatic Turkey.
