= Zibo Vocational Institute =

University in Zibo, China

Zibo Polytechnic University
- 淄博职业技术大学
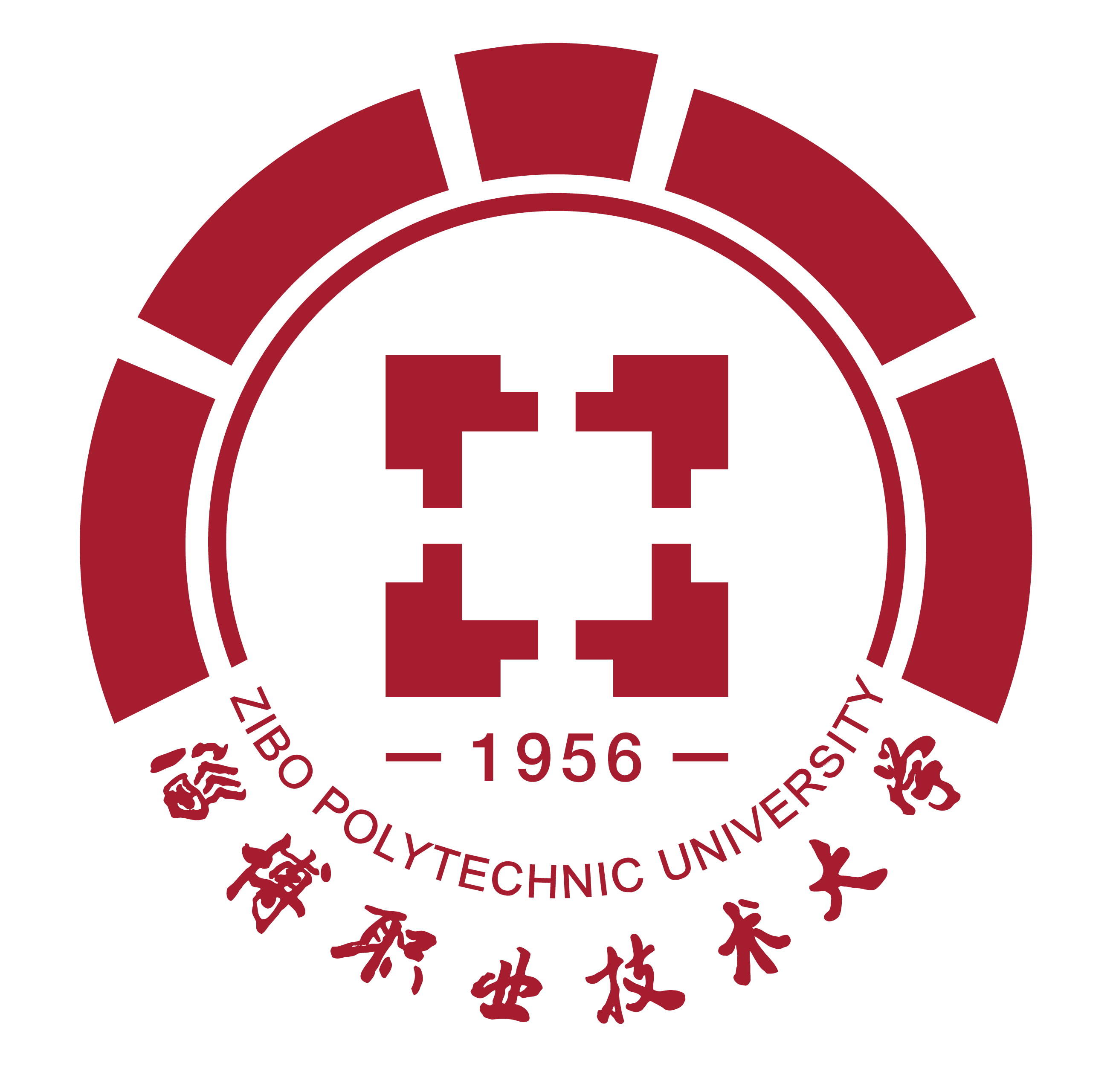
- Official Seal of Zibo Polytechnic University
- Former name: Zibo Vocational Institute (Chinese: 淄博职业学院）
- Motto: 只有拼搏，才是人生价值的最好体验
- Motto in English: Only through struggle can we best experience the value of life
- Type: Public
- Established: 1956
- President: 孙正 Sun Zheng
- Faculty: 1,400 (in 2024)
- Students: 24,000 (in 2024)
- Location: Zibo, Shandong, China
- Campus: Zhoucun (4)
- Nickname: Zizhi(Chinese: 淄职})

Zibo Polytechnic University (淄博职业技术大学; ZBPU) is a public vocational university in Zibo, Shandong, China. The university is part of High-level Vocational Schools and Specialty Construction Plan with Chinese Characteristics.In March 2025, Zibo Vocational Institute was restructured and elevated to become Zibo Polytechnic University by the Ministry of Education of China.

== School Environment ==
Zibo Polytechnic University is located between Zhangdian District and Zhoucun District. The 4 campuses are next to each other on Liantong Road.

Zibo Polytechnic University covers an area of over 2,400 mu (approximately 400 acres) and has a student population of more than 24,000. It comprises 19 departments which offers 74 programs, including 6 vocational undergraduate programs. ZBPU now has 4 national-level TVET training bases, 1 national virtual simulation training base Incubation Program, 3 national-level productive training bases, 1 national virtual simulation training center, 2 National Centersfor Collaborative Innovation, and 1 national-level "dual-qualified" (combining academic and technical expertise) teacher straining center.

Extracurricular activities on the campus include tai chi, roller-blading, basketball and breakdancing. Xi Jie, or West Street, divides the North Campus and the West Campus. West Street has a variety of inexpensive restaurants and snack stalls which cater to the student population. Other amenities such as mobile phone stores, hairdressers, internet cafe, post office and bicycle shops are on-campus or nearby.

=== North Campus ===
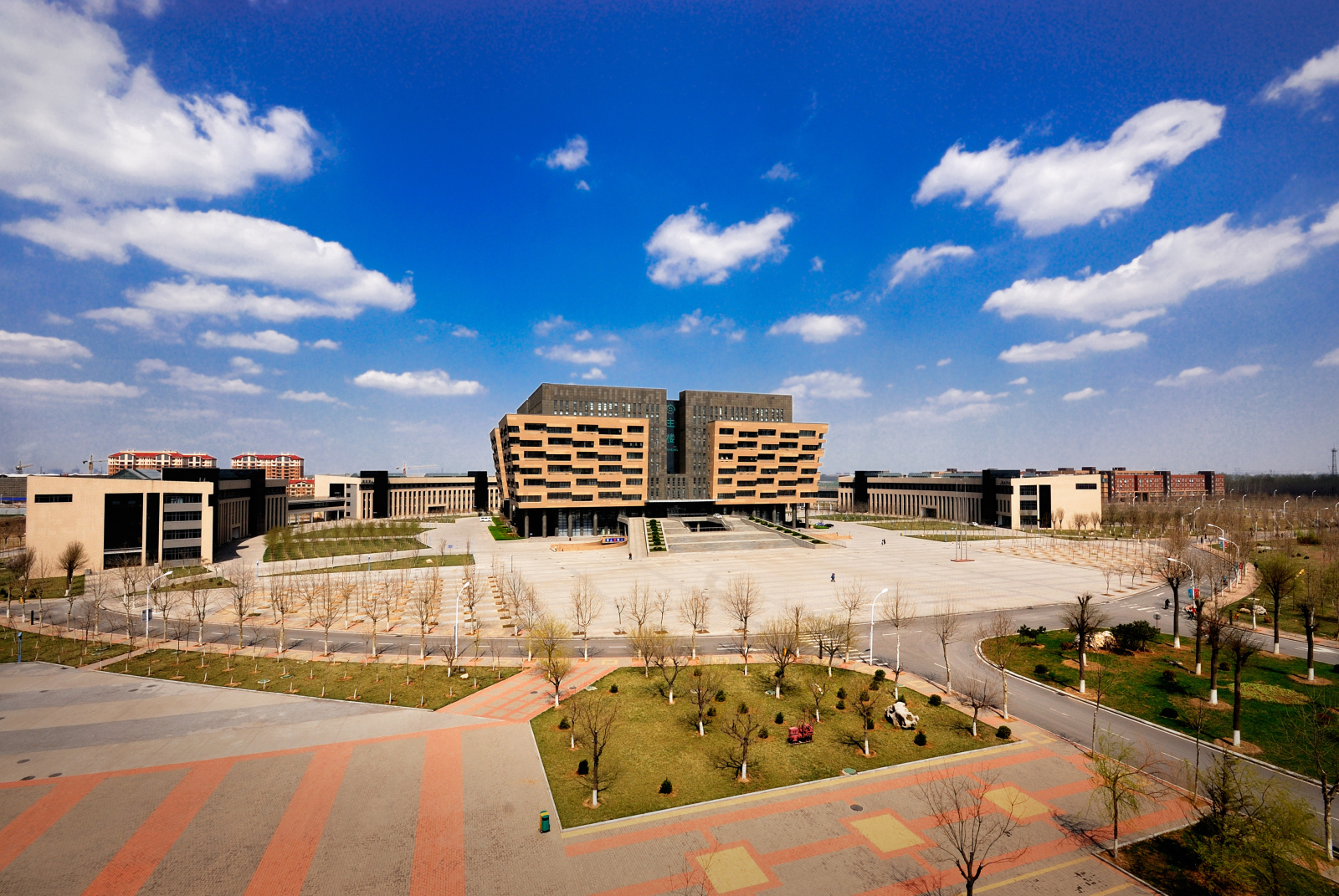
North campus main building

The North Campus was established in 2008. The campus is dominated by the main academic building, a trapezoid-shaped multi-story facility. The school cartoon mascot, Huan Huan, meaning "double happy," has a trapezoid—shaped head which echoes the design of the main academic building. The main school library is housed in this building. The North Campus also features a large artificial lake, nicknamed the "Northern Sea."

- Schools at the North Campus
  - Vehicle Engineering
  - Chemical Engineering
  - Mechanical and Electrical Engineering
  - Ceramic and Art
  - Pharmaceutical and Biotechnology
  - Electrical and Electronic Engineering

==== Café ====
- In-school cafe bar

=== Overpass ===
North Campus and South Campus are connected by a pedestrian overpass.

=== South Campus ===
The South Campus established in 2006, includes the International School where foreign students study Chinese. The grounds of the South Campus are thickly planted with trees. This area is known as the "Little Wood."

- Schools at the South Campus
  - International School
  - Accounting
  - Information Engineering
  - Animation and Art
  - Arts Design
  - Culture Communication
  - Tourism Management
  - Architectural Engineering
  - International Institute of Business Administration
- South Campus contains two dining halls, four convenience stores, one fruit market and several milk-tea bars.
- Cosplay show hold annually by The Animation and Art Institute

=== West Campus ===
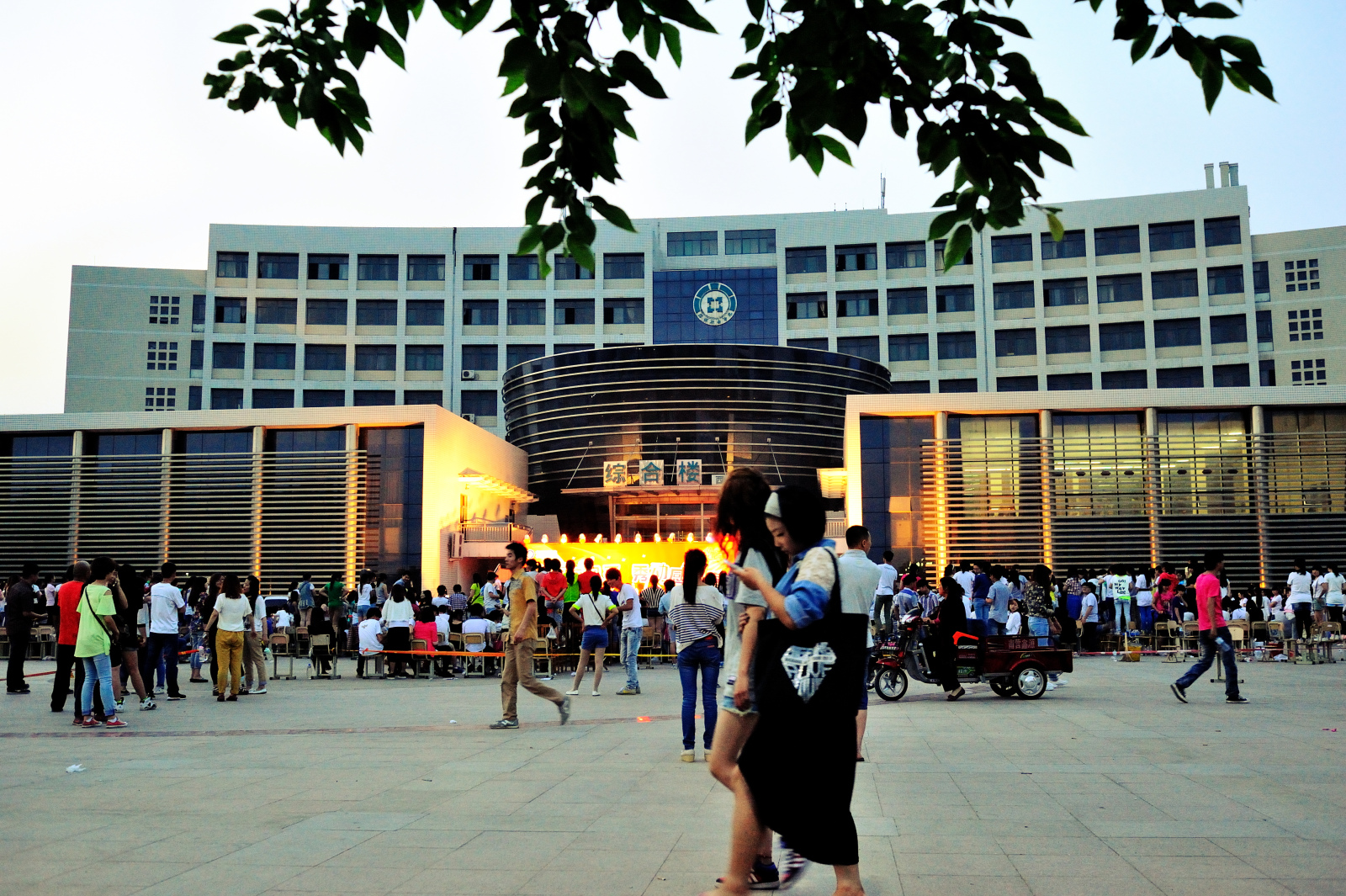
West campus main building

The West Campus established in 2002, features an artificial lake stocked with ornamental fish and many ornamental cherry trees. A training hospital is located at this campus.

- Institutes
  - Department of Pharmacy
  - School of Nursing
  - School of Medical Technology

=== East Campus ===
The East Campus established in 2022, this campus shares facilities with Qingdao University of Science and Technology.
