= Gamō Station =

Railway station in Koshigaya, Saitama Prefecture, Japan

TS19 Gamō Station 蒲生駅
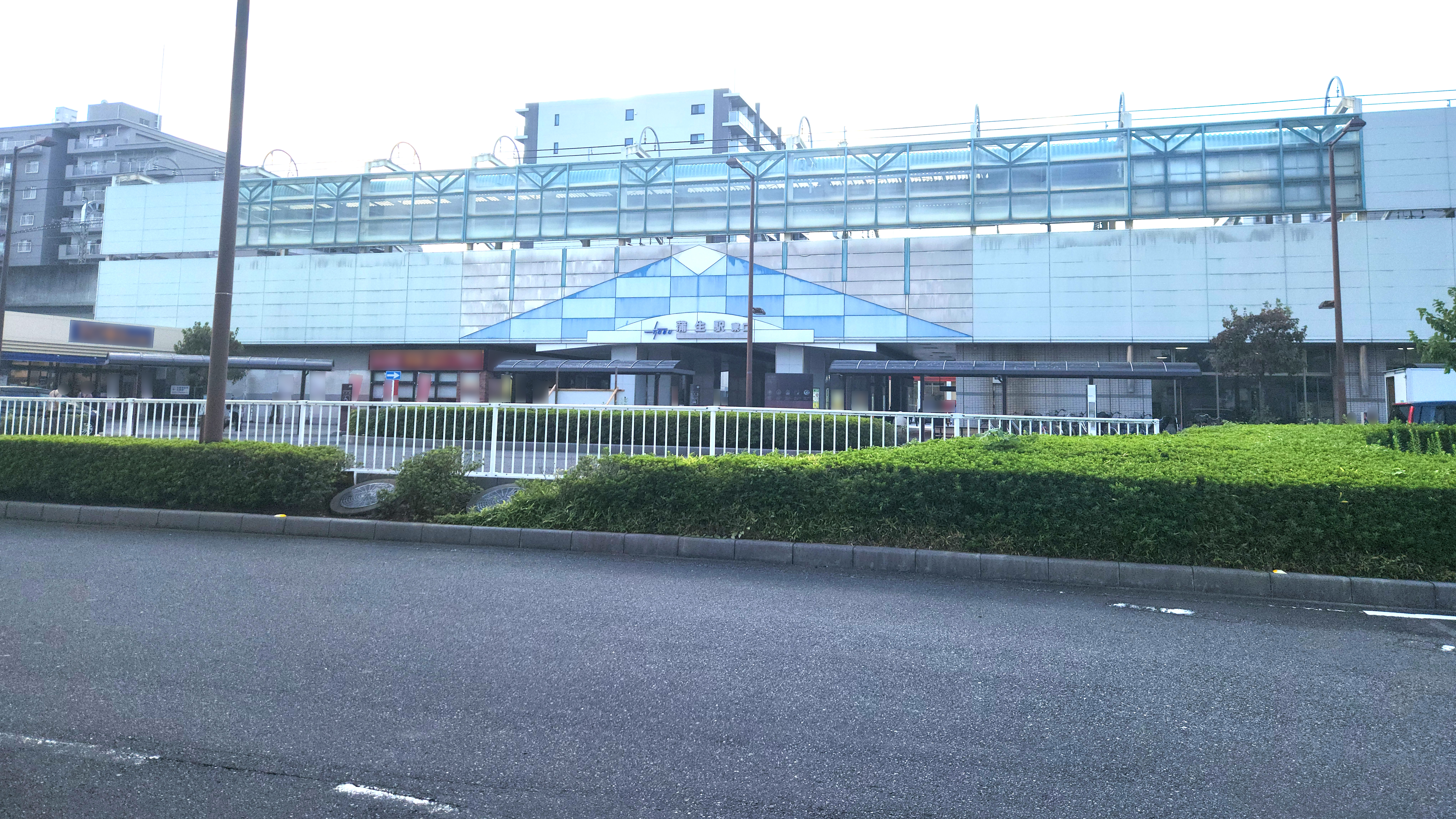
- Gamō Station East Exit in October 2024

General information
- Location: Gamōkotobuki-cho, Koshigaya-shi, Saitama-ken 343-0836; Japan
- Coordinates: 35.8669°N 139.7914°E
- Operator: Tōbu Railway
- Line: Tōbu Skytree Line
- Distance: 21.9 km from Asakusa.
- Platforms: 1 island platform

Other information
- Station code: TS-19
- Website: Official website

History
- Opened: 20 December 1899

Passengers
- FY2024: 8,606 daily boardings

Services
Preceding station	Tobu Railway	Following station
Shinden TS18 towards Asakusa	Tobu Skytree Line Local	Shin-Koshigaya TS20 towards Tōbu-Dōbutsu-Kōen
Location
- Location within Saitama Prefecture Location within Japan

Gamō Station (蒲生駅, Gamō-eki) is a passenger railway station located in the city of Koshigaya, Saitama, Japan, operated by the private railway operator Tōbu Railway.

== Line ==
The station is served by the Tōbu Skytree Line (Tōbu Isesaki Line), and is 21.9 kilometers from the terminus of the line at Asakusa Station.

== Station layout ==
The station has one elevated island platform with two tracks. The station building is located underneath the platforms. There are two additional tracks for express trains to bypass this station.

=== Platforms ===
1	Tōbu Skytree Line	for Kita-Senju, Hikifune, and Asakusa; Tokyo Metro Hibiya Line for Ueno and Naka-meguro
2	Tōbu Skytree Line	for Kita-Koshigaya, Kasukabe, and Tōbu-Dōbutsu-Kōen; Tobu Nikko Line for Minami-Kurihashi

== History ==
Gamō Station opened on 20 December 1899. The station was relocated 1.2 kilometers south to its present location on 25 December 1908. A new station building was completed in 1998. From 17 March 2012, station numbering was introduced on all Tōbu lines, with Gamō Station becoming "TS-19".

== Passenger statistics ==
In fiscal 2024, the station was used by an average of 8,606 passengers daily (boarding passengers only).

== Surrounding area ==
- Gamō shopping street

== See also ==
- List of railway stations in Japan
