= Sengendai Station =

Railway station in Koshigaya, Saitama Prefecture, Japan

TS24 Sengendai Station せんげん台駅
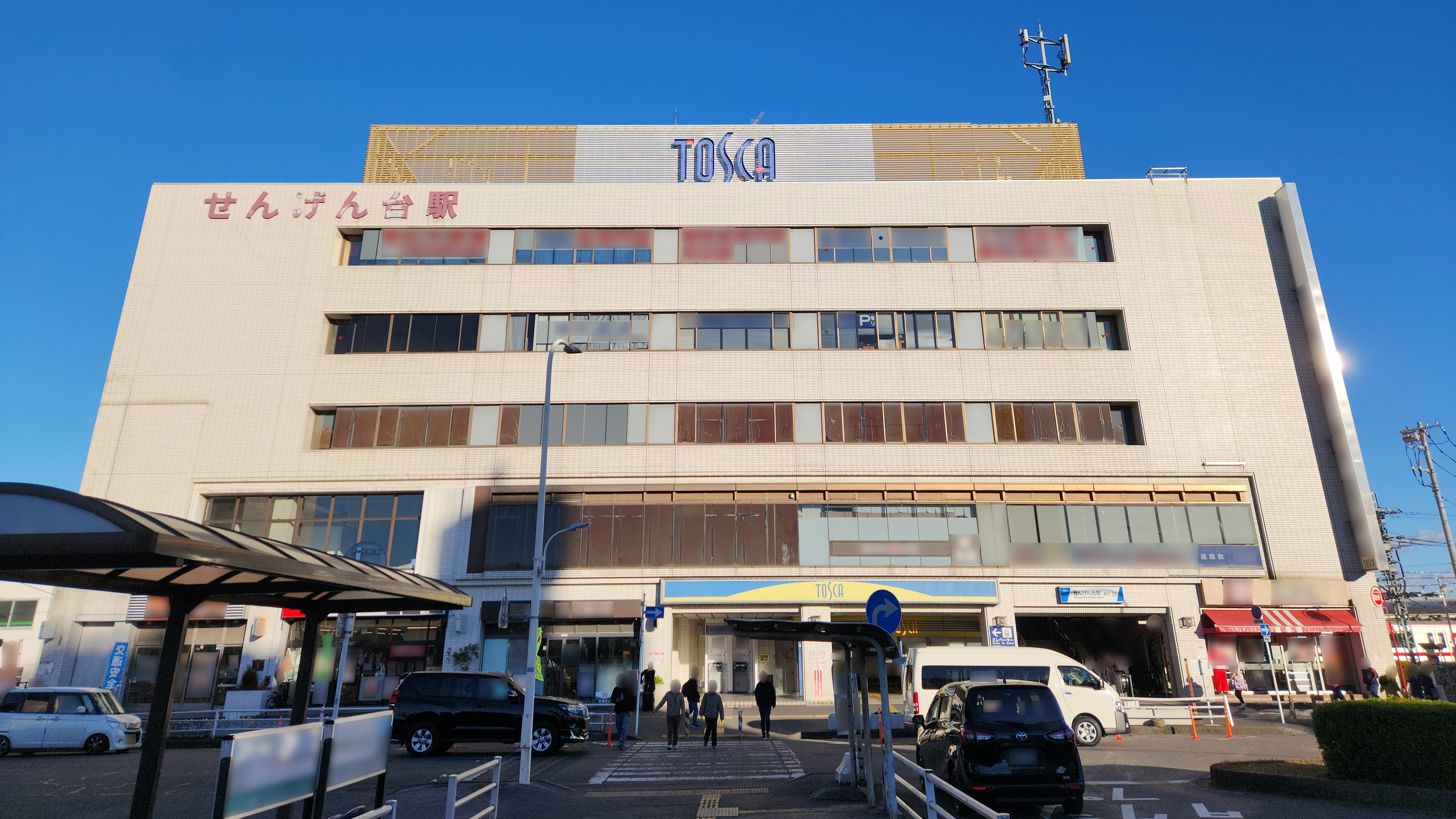
- The west exit of Sengendai Station in December 2024

General information
- Location: 1-62-1 Sengendai-Higashi, Koshigaya City, Saitama Prefecture 343-0042; Japan
- Coordinates: 35.9360°N 139.7744°E
- Operator: Tōbu Railway
- Line: Tōbu Skytree Line
- Distance: 29.8 km (18.5 mi) from Asakusa Station
- Platforms: 2 island platforms
- Tracks: 4

Other information
- Station code: TS-24
- Website: Official website

History
- Opened: 15 April 1967; 59 years ago

Passengers
- FY2024: 25,521 daily boardings

Services
Preceding station	Tobu Railway	Following station
Kita-Senju One-way operation	Skytree Liner	Kasukabe TS27 Terminus
Kita-Senju One-way operation	Urban Park Liner from Asakusa	Kasukabe TS27 towards Ōmiya or Kashiwa
Shin-Koshigaya TS20 towards Ebisu	TH Liner	Kasukabe TS27 towards Kuki
Koshigaya TS21 towards Oshiage	Tobu Skytree Line Express	Kasukabe TS27 towards Tōbu-Dōbutsu-Kōen
Koshigaya TS21 towards Asakusa	Tobu Skytree Line Section Express	Kasukabe TS27 towards Tōbu-Dōbutsu-Kōen
Ōbukuro TS23 towards Oshiage	Tobu Skytree Line Semi Express	Takesato TS25 towards Tōbu-Dōbutsu-Kōen
Ōbukuro TS23 towards Asakusa	Tobu Skytree Line Section Semi Express Local	Takesato TS25 towards Tōbu-Dōbutsu-Kōen
Location
- Location within Saitama Prefecture Location within Kanto Area Location within Japan

Sengendai Station (せんげん台駅, Sengendai-eki) is a passenger railway station located in the city of Koshigaya, Saitama, Japan, operated by the private railway operator Tōbu Railway.

== Line ==
Sengendai Station is served by the Tōbu Skytree Line (Tōbu Isesaki Line), and is 29.8 kilometers from the terminus of the line at Asakusa Station.

== Station layout ==
The station has two island platforms with two through tracks and two tracks on passing loops, with an elevated station building above the tracks and platforms.

=== Platforms ===
1/2	Tōbu Skytree Line	for Kita-Senju, Hikifune, and Asakusa; Tokyo Metro Hibiya Line for Ueno and Naka-meguro; Tokyo Metro Hanzomon Line for Shibuya; Tokyu Den-en-toshi Line for Chūō-rinkan
3/4	Tōbu Skytree Line	for Kasukabe and Tōbu-Dōbutsu-Kōen; Tobu Isesaki Line for Kuki, Tatebayashi and Ōta; Tōbu Nikkō Line for Minami-Kurihashi

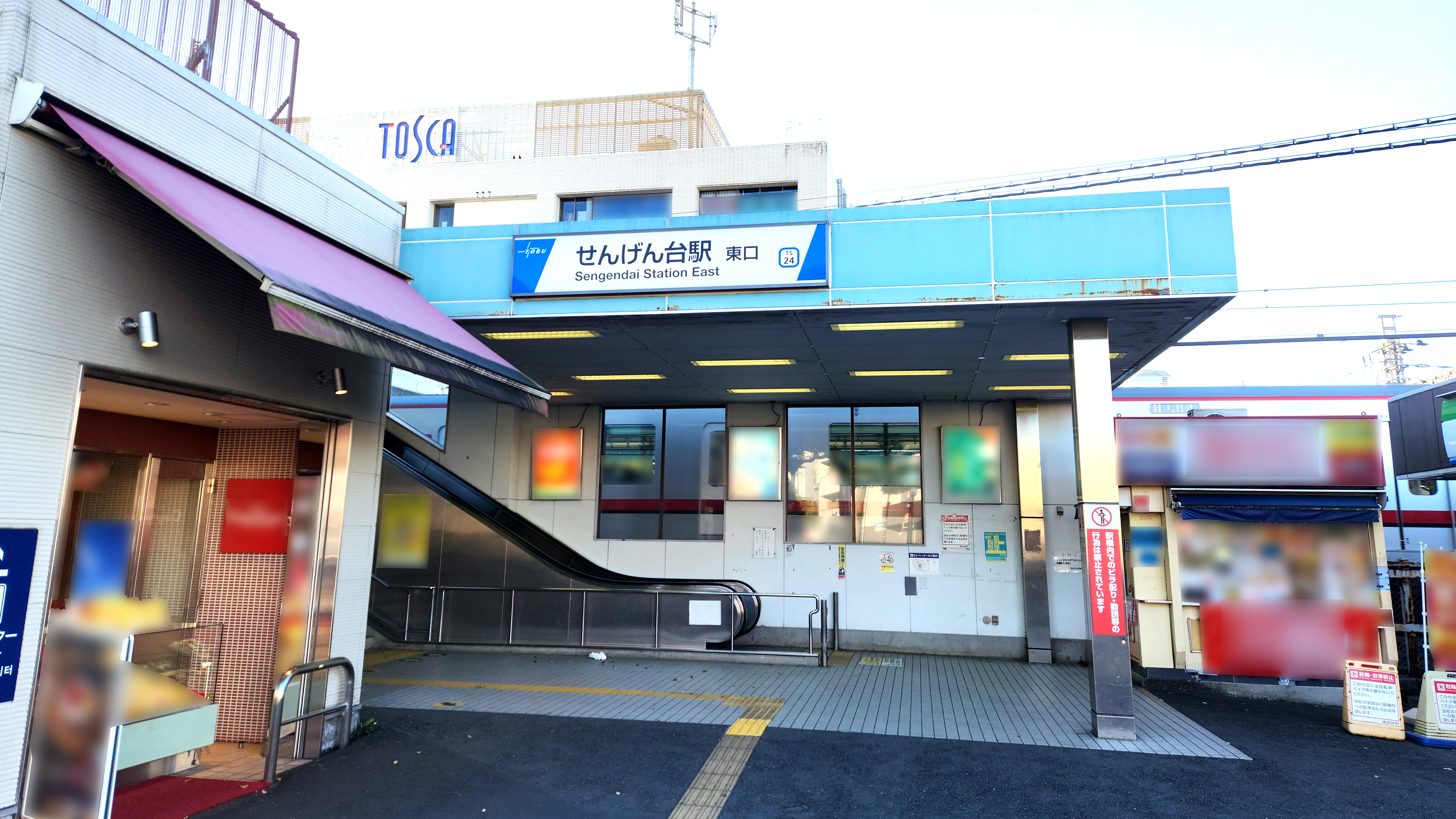
The east exit of Sengendai Station in December 2024

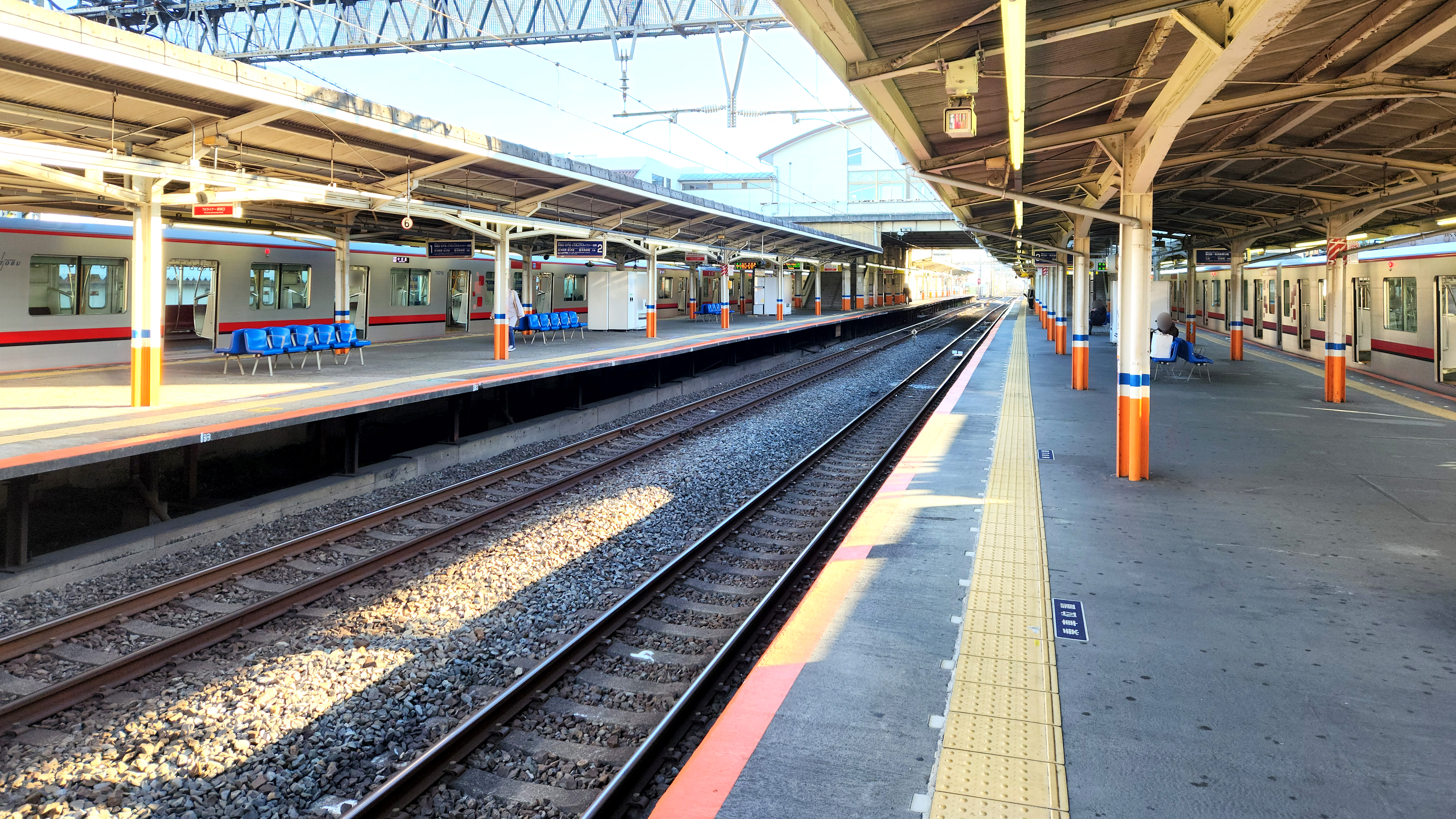
Station platforms in December 2024

== History ==
Sengendai Station opened on 15 April 1967. From 17 March 2012, station numbering was introduced on all Tōbu lines, with Sengendai Station becoming "TS-24".

== Passenger statistics ==
In fiscal 2024, the station was used by an average of 25,521 passengers daily (boarding passengers only).

== Surrounding area ==
- Takesato Housing District
- Saitama Prefectural University
- National Route 4

== See also ==
- List of railway stations in Japan
