= Koshigaya Station =

Railway station in Koshigaya, Saitama Prefecture, Japan

TS21 Koshigaya Station 越谷駅
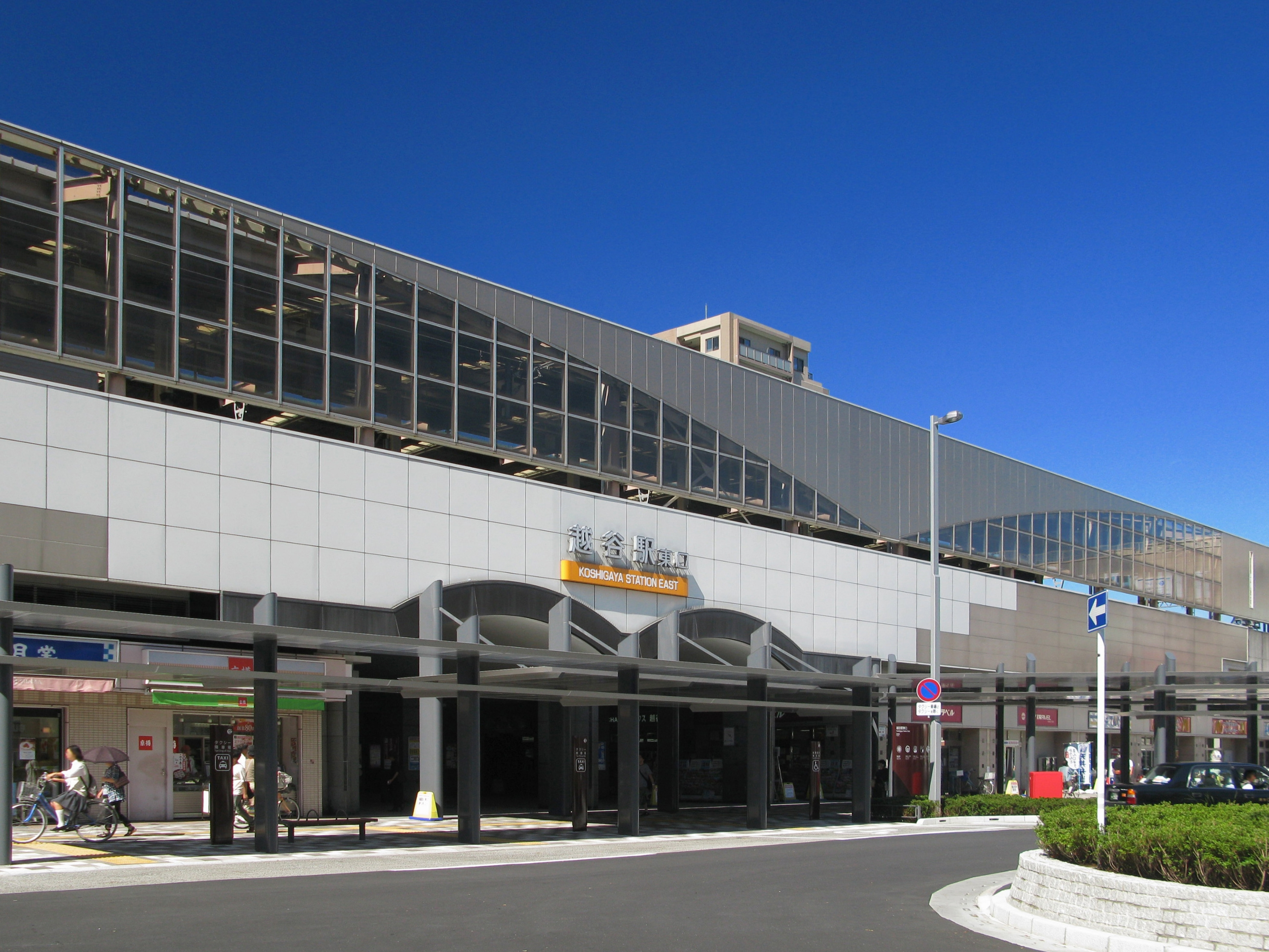
- Koshigaya Station east entrance in September 2012

General information
- Location: 4-11 Yayoichō, Koshigaya City, Saitama Prefecture 343-0816; Japan
- Coordinates: 35.8876°N 139.7863°E
- Operator: Tōbu Railway
- Line: Tōbu Skytree Line
- Distance: 24.4 km (15.2 mi) from Asakusa
- Platforms: 2 island platforms
- Tracks: 6

Construction
- Structure type: Elevated

Other information
- Station code: TS-21
- Website: Official website

History
- Opened: 17 April 1920; 106 years ago
- Rebuilt: 25 March 1997; 29 years ago

Passengers
- FY2024: 24,108 daily boardings

Services
Preceding station	Tobu Railway	Following station
Shin-Koshigaya TS20 towards Oshiage	Tobu Skytree Line Express	Sengendai TS24 towards Tōbu-Dōbutsu-Kōen
Shin-Koshigaya TS20 towards Asakusa	Tobu Skytree Line Section Express	Sengendai TS24 towards Tōbu-Dōbutsu-Kōen
Shin-Koshigaya TS20 towards Oshiage	Tobu Skytree Line Semi Express	Kita-Koshigaya TS22 towards Tōbu-Dōbutsu-Kōen
Shin-Koshigaya TS20 towards Asakusa	Tobu Skytree Line Section Semi Express Local	Kita-Koshigaya TS22 towards Tōbu-Dōbutsu-Kōen
Location
- Location within Saitama Prefecture Location within Kanto Area Location within Japan

Koshigaya Station (越谷駅, Koshigaya-eki) is a passenger railway station located in the city of Koshigaya, Saitama, Japan, operated by the private railway operator Tōbu Railway.

== Lines ==
The station is served by the Tōbu Skytree Line (Tōbu Isesaki Line), and is 24.4 kilometers from the terminus of the line at Asakusa Station in Tokyo. Through services also operate to and from Naka-Meguro via the Tokyo Metro Hibiya Line and Shibuya via the Tokyo Metro Hanzomon Line.

== Station layout ==
The station has two elevated island platforms with two tracks each, one for all-stations "Local" services and one for express/rapid services. The station building is located underneath the platforms. There are two additional tracks for non-stopping trains to pass this station.

=== Platforms ===
1	Tōbu Skytree Line	for Kita-Senju, Hikifune, and Asakusa; Tokyo Metro Hanzomon Line for Shibuya; Tokyu Den-en-toshi Line for Chūō-rinkan
2	Tōbu Skytree Line	for Kita-Senju, Hikifune, and Asakusa; Tokyo Metro Hibiya Line for Ueno and Naka-meguro
3	Tōbu Skytree Line	for Kita-Koshigaya, Kasukabe, and Tōbu-Dōbutsu-Kōen; Tobu Nikko Line for Minami-Kurihashi
4	Tōbu Skytree Line	for Kasukabe and Tōbu-Dōbutsu-Kōen; Tobu Isesaki Line for Kuki, Tatebayashi and Ōta; Tōbu Nikkō Line for Minami-Kurihashi

Platforms 2 and 3 are used by all-stations "Local" services. Platforms 1 and 4 are used by "Express" and "Semi-Express" services.

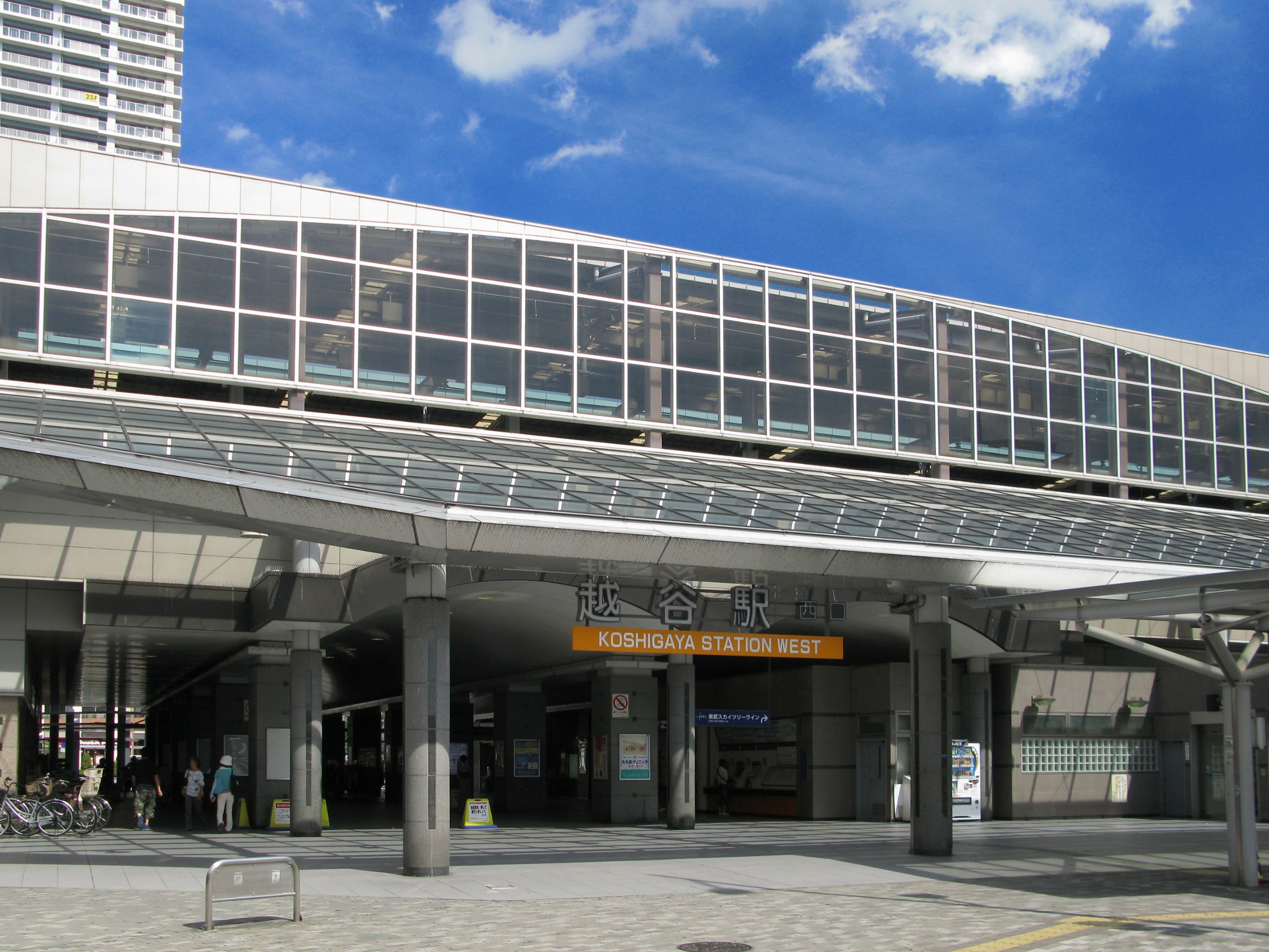
The west entrance in September 2012

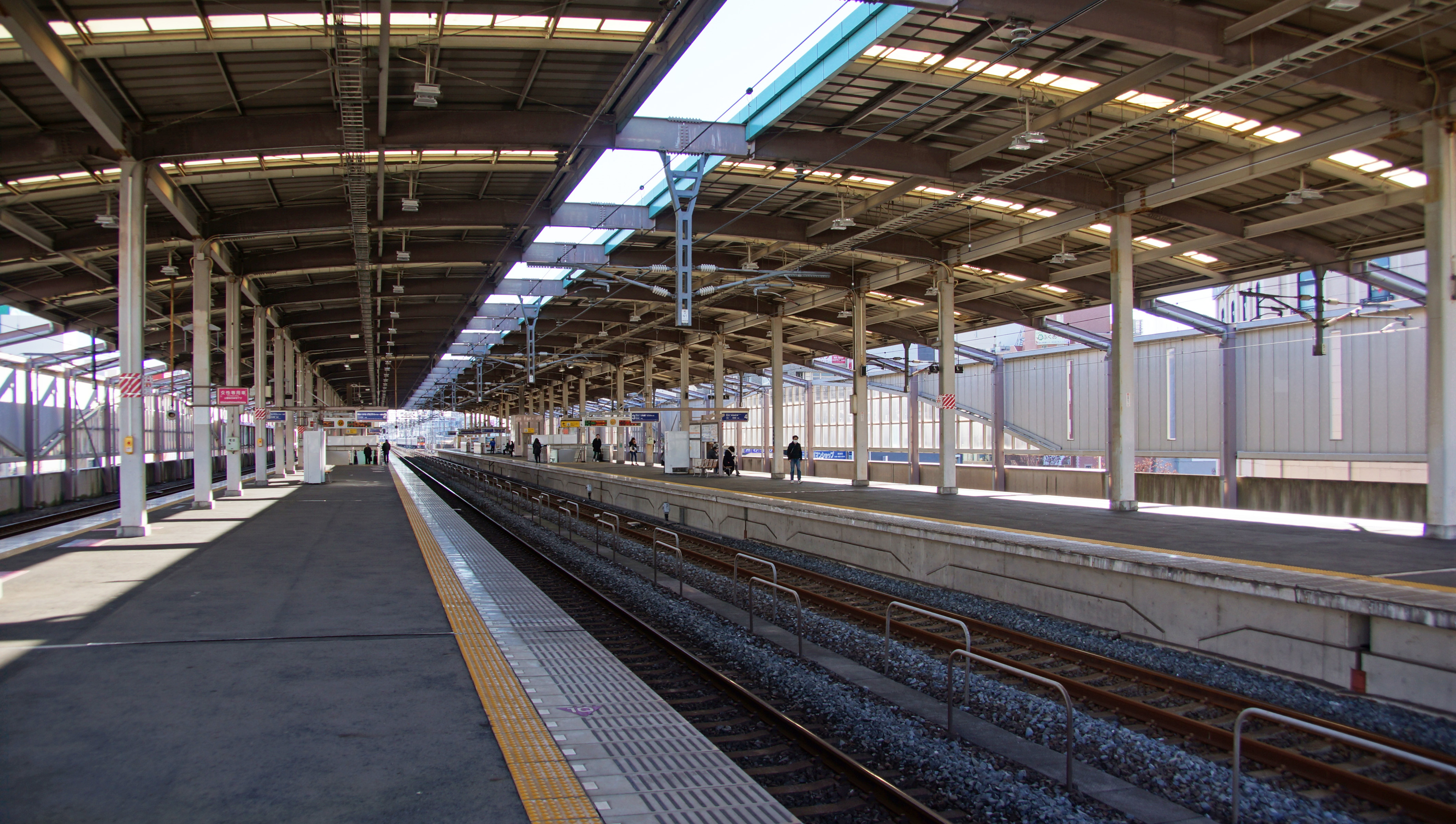
The north end of the up platforms 1 and 2 in December 2016

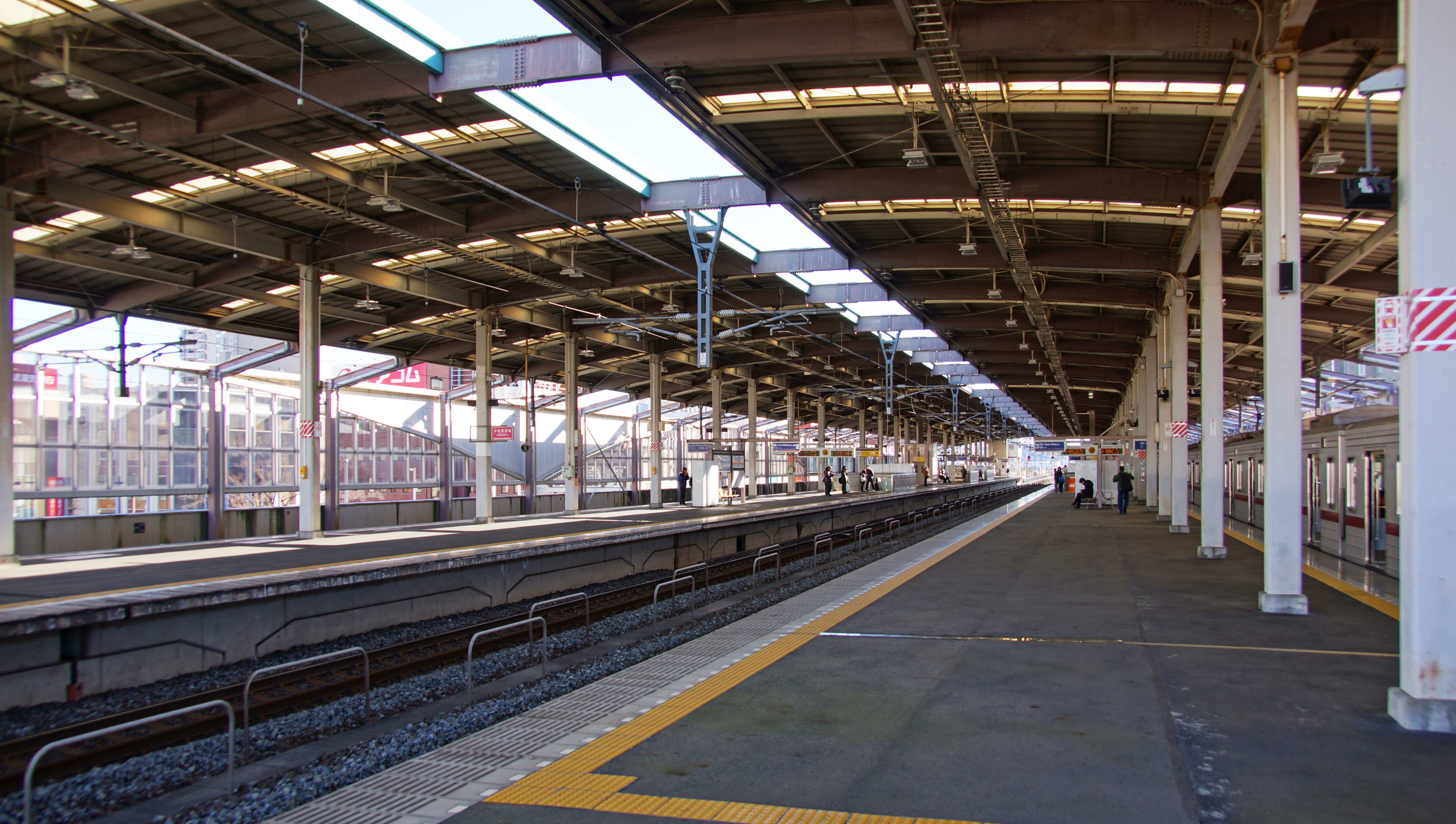
The north end of the down platforms 3 and 4 in December 2016

== History ==
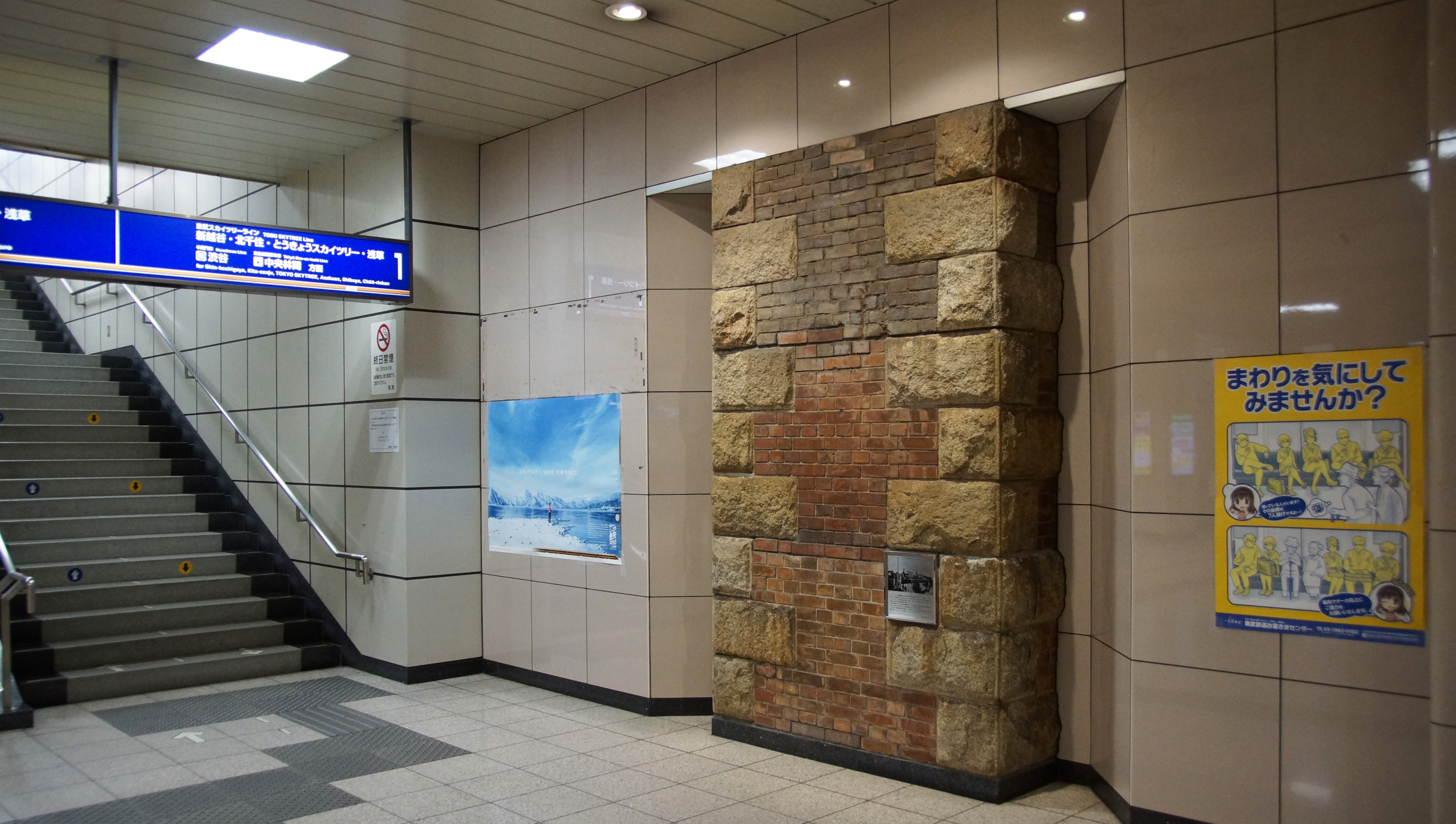
Brickwork formerly used in a railway viaduct over the Old Arakawa River between Koshigaya and Kita-Koshigaya stations from 1899 until 1994. The brickwork was installed in the station as a monument in December 1995.

Koshigaya Station opened on 17 April 1920, with the name originally written as "越ヶ谷駅". The kanji characters for the station name were changed to "越谷駅" (with the pronunciation unchanged) on 1 December 1956. The station was rebuilt with elevated platforms in 1997.

From 17 March 2012, station numbering was introduced on all Tōbu lines, with Koshigaya Station becoming "TS-21".

The station was renovated between 2022 and 2026, using recycled wood sourced from the former roof of Kuzu Station.

== Passenger statistics ==
In fiscal 2024, the station was used by an average of 24,108 passengers daily (boarding passengers only).

== Surrounding area ==
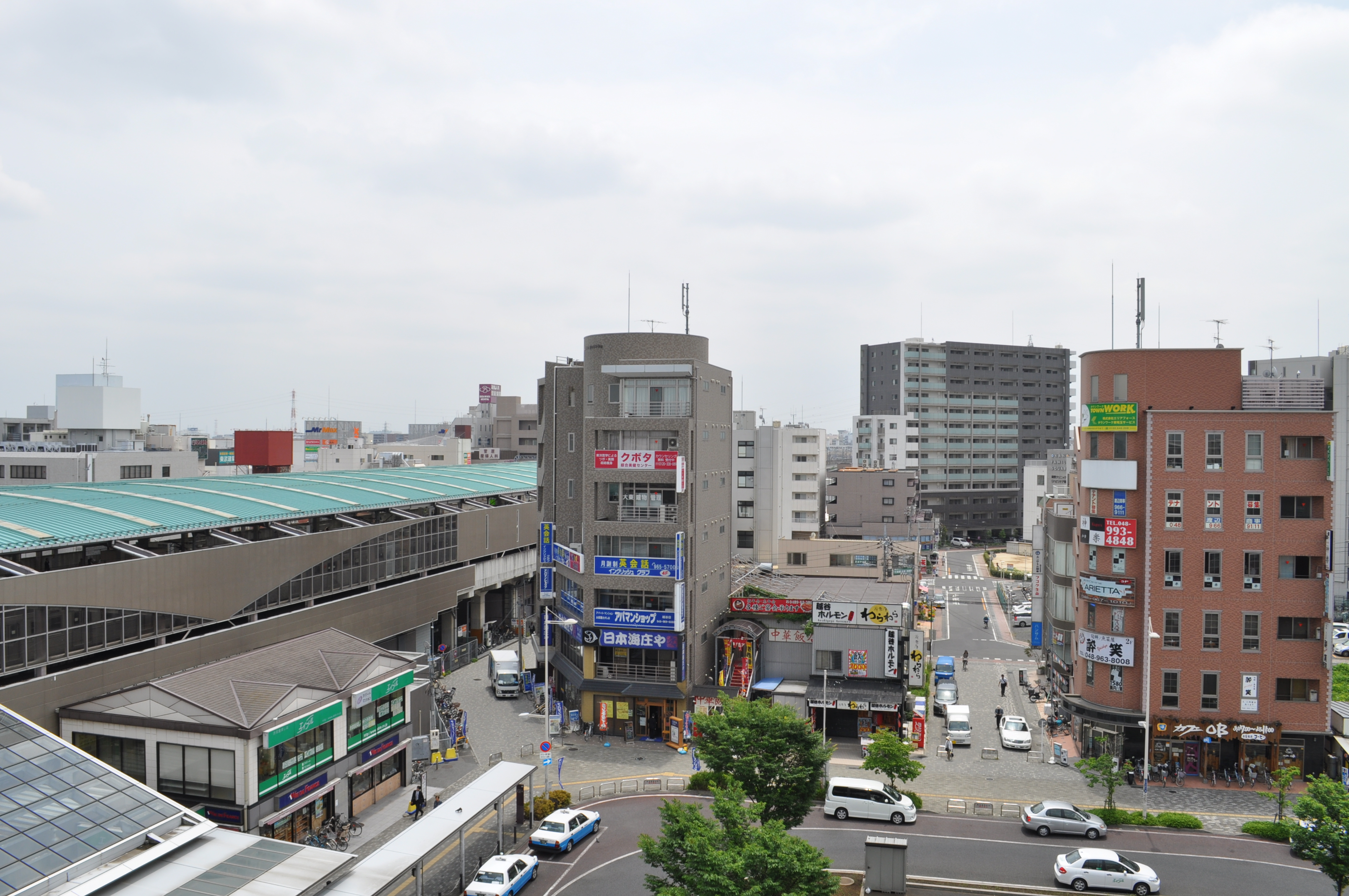
The west side of the station in June 2012

- Koshigaya City Office
- Koshigaya City Library
- Koshigaya Municipal Hospital

=== Schools ===
- Saitama Prefectural Koshigaya High School
- Saitama Prefectural Koshigaya Higashi High School
- Koshigaya Sogo Gijutsu High School
- Koshigaya Elementary School

== See also ==
- List of railway stations in Japan
