= Shin-Koshigaya Station =

Railway station in Koshigaya, Saitama Prefecture, Japan

TS20 Shin-Koshigaya Station 新越谷駅
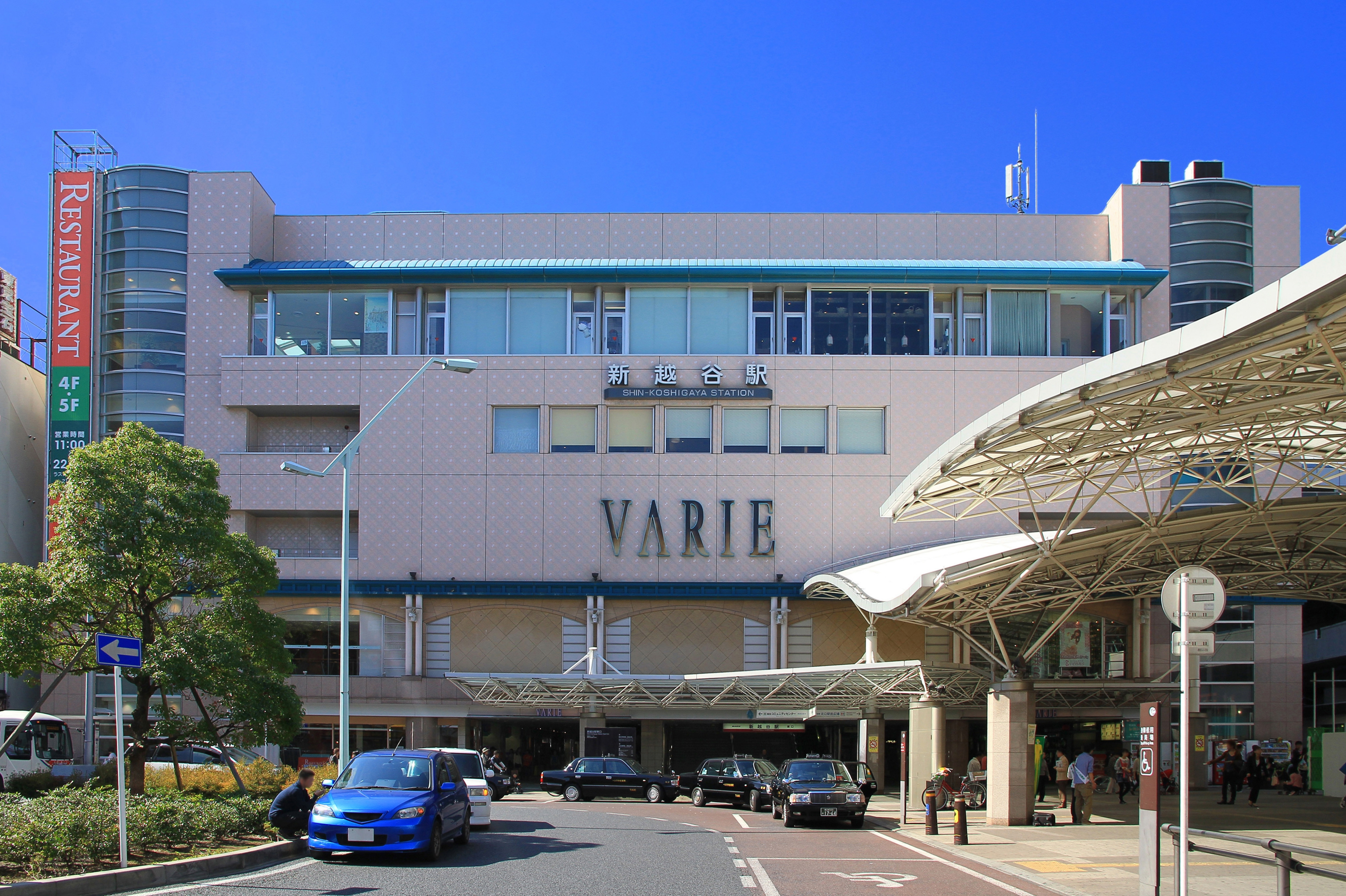
- The east entrance in October 2012

General information
- Location: 1-11-4 Minami-Koshigaya, Koshigaya City, Saitama Prefecture 343–0845; Japan
- Coordinates: 35.8750°N 139.7897°E
- Operator: Tōbu Railway
- Line: Tōbu Skytree Line
- Distance: 22.9 km (14.2 mi) from Asakusa
- Platforms: 2 island platforms
- Tracks: 4
- Connections: JM22 Minami-Koshigaya; Musashino Line; Bus terminal

Other information
- Station code: TS-20
- Website: Official website

History
- Opened: 23 July 1974; 52 years ago

Passengers
- FY2024: 71,011 daily boardings

Services
Preceding station	Tobu Railway	Following station
Ueno towards Ebisu	TH Liner	Sengendai TS24 towards Kuki
Sōka TS16 towards Oshiage	Tobu Skytree Line Express	Koshigaya TS21 towards Tōbu-Dōbutsu-Kōen
Sōka TS16 towards Asakusa	Tobu Skytree Line Section Express	Koshigaya TS21 towards Tōbu-Dōbutsu-Kōen
Sōka TS16 towards Oshiage	Tobu Skytree Line Semi Express	Koshigaya TS21 towards Tōbu-Dōbutsu-Kōen
Sōka TS16 towards Asakusa	Tobu Skytree Line Section Semi Express	Koshigaya TS21 towards Tōbu-Dōbutsu-Kōen
Gamō TS19 towards Asakusa	Tobu Skytree Line Local	Koshigaya TS21 towards Tōbu-Dōbutsu-Kōen
Location
- Location within Saitama Prefecture Location within Kanto Area Location within Japan

Shin-Koshigaya Station (新越谷駅, Shin-Koshigaya-eki) is a passenger railway station located in the city of Koshigaya, Saitama, Japan, operated by the private railway operator Tōbu Railway.

== Lines ==
Shin-Koshigaya Station is served by the Tōbu Skytree Line from Asakusa in Tokyo, and is 22.9 km (14.2 mi) from the Asakusa terminus. Through services also operate to and from Naka-Meguro via the Tokyo Metro Hibiya Line and Shibuya via the Tokyo Metro Hanzomon Line. It is also located adjacent to Minami-Koshigaya Station on the Musashino Line.

== Station layout ==
The elevated station consists of a five-story station building with two island platforms serving four tracks on the 4th floor level.

=== Platforms ===
1	Tōbu Skytree Line	for Kita-Senju, Hikifune, and Asakusa; Tokyo Metro Hanzomon Line for Shibuya; Tokyu Den-en-toshi Line for Chūō-rinkan
2	Tōbu Skytree Line	for Kita-Senju, Hikifune, and Asakusa; Tokyo Metro Hibiya Line for Ueno and Naka-meguro
3	Tōbu Skytree Line	for Kita-Koshigaya, Kasukabe, and Tōbu-Dōbutsu-Kōen; Tobu Nikko Line for Minami-Kurihashi
4	Tōbu Skytree Line	for Kasukabe and Tōbu-Dōbutsu-Kōen; Tobu Isesaki Line for Kuki, Tatebayashi and Ōta; Tōbu Nikkō Line for Minami-Kurihashi

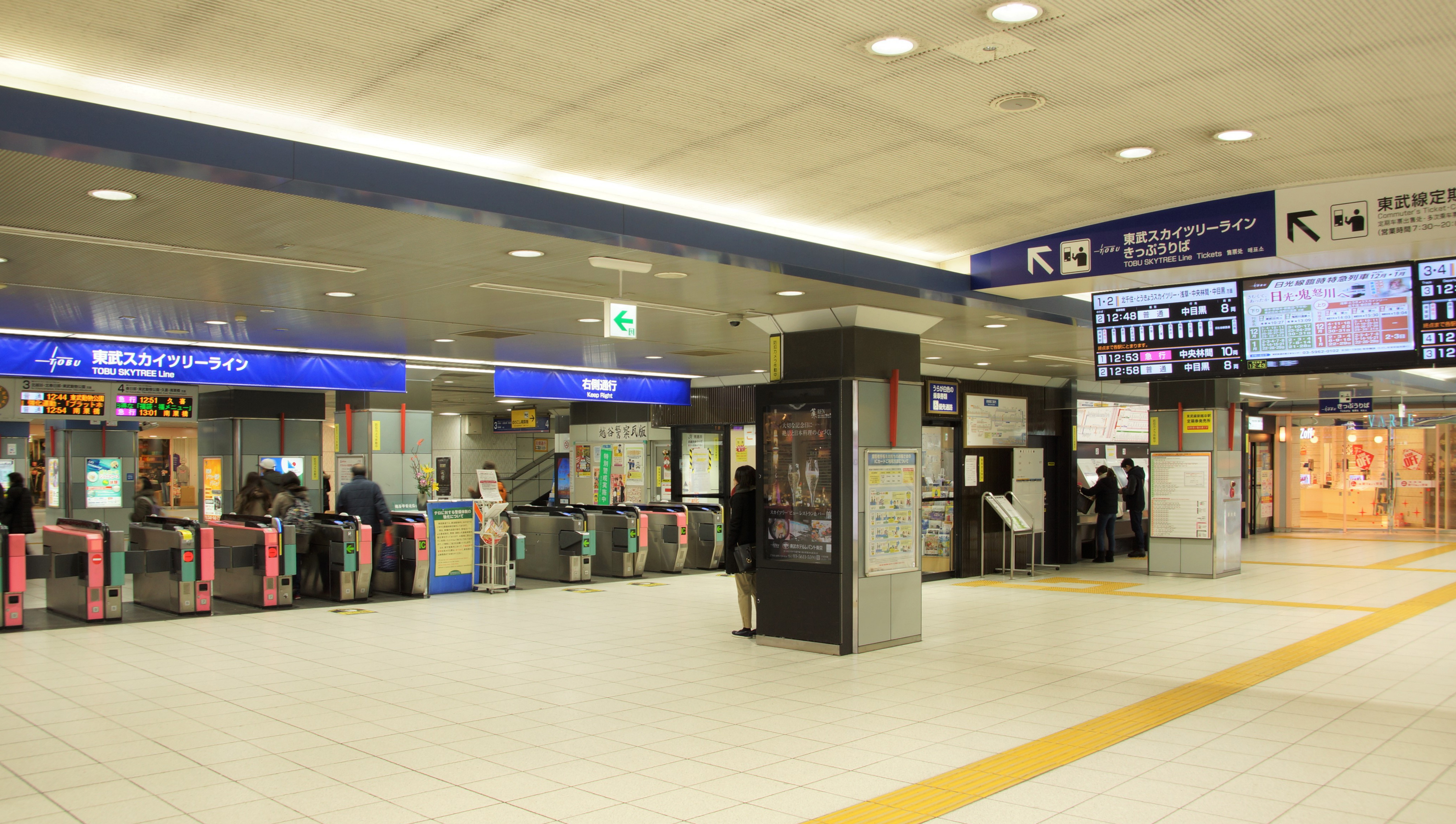
The entrance and ticket barriers in December 2016

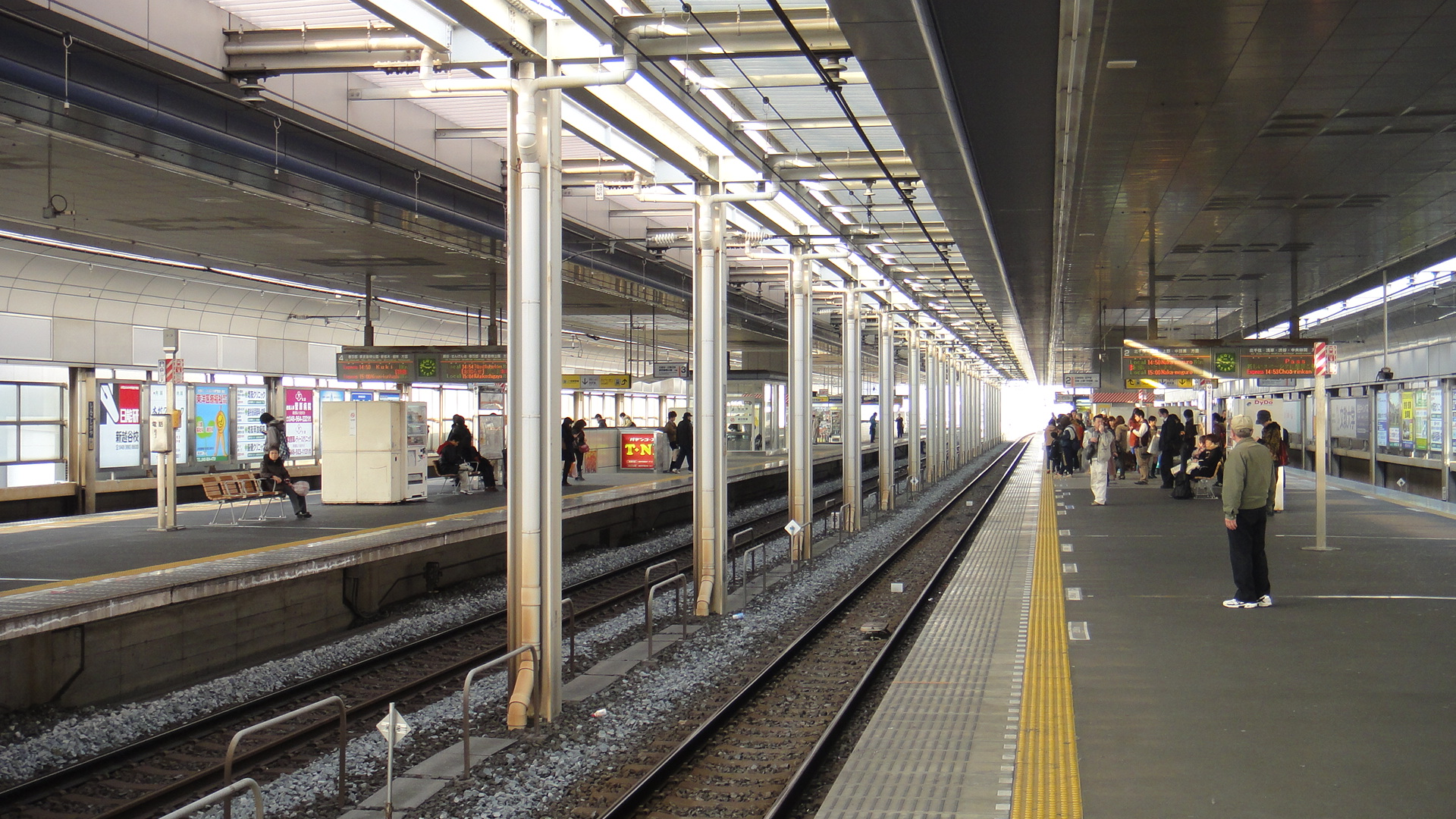
View of the platforms looking northward from platform 2 in January 2012

== History ==
The station opened on 23 July 1974. From 17 March 2012, station numbering was introduced on all Tobu lines, with Shin-Koshigaya Station becoming "TS-20".

== Future developments ==
Chest-high platform edge doors are scheduled to be added by the end of fiscal 2020.

== Passenger statistics ==
In fiscal 2024, the station was used by an average of 71,011 passengers daily (boarding passengers only).

== Surrounding area ==
- Minami-Koshigaya Station (Musashino Line)
- Saitama Toho Junior College
- Koshigaya Freight Terminal
- Dokkyo Medical University Koshigaya Hospital

== See also ==
- List of railway stations in Japan
