= Tobu Skytree Line =

Section of the Tobu Isesaki Line in Japan

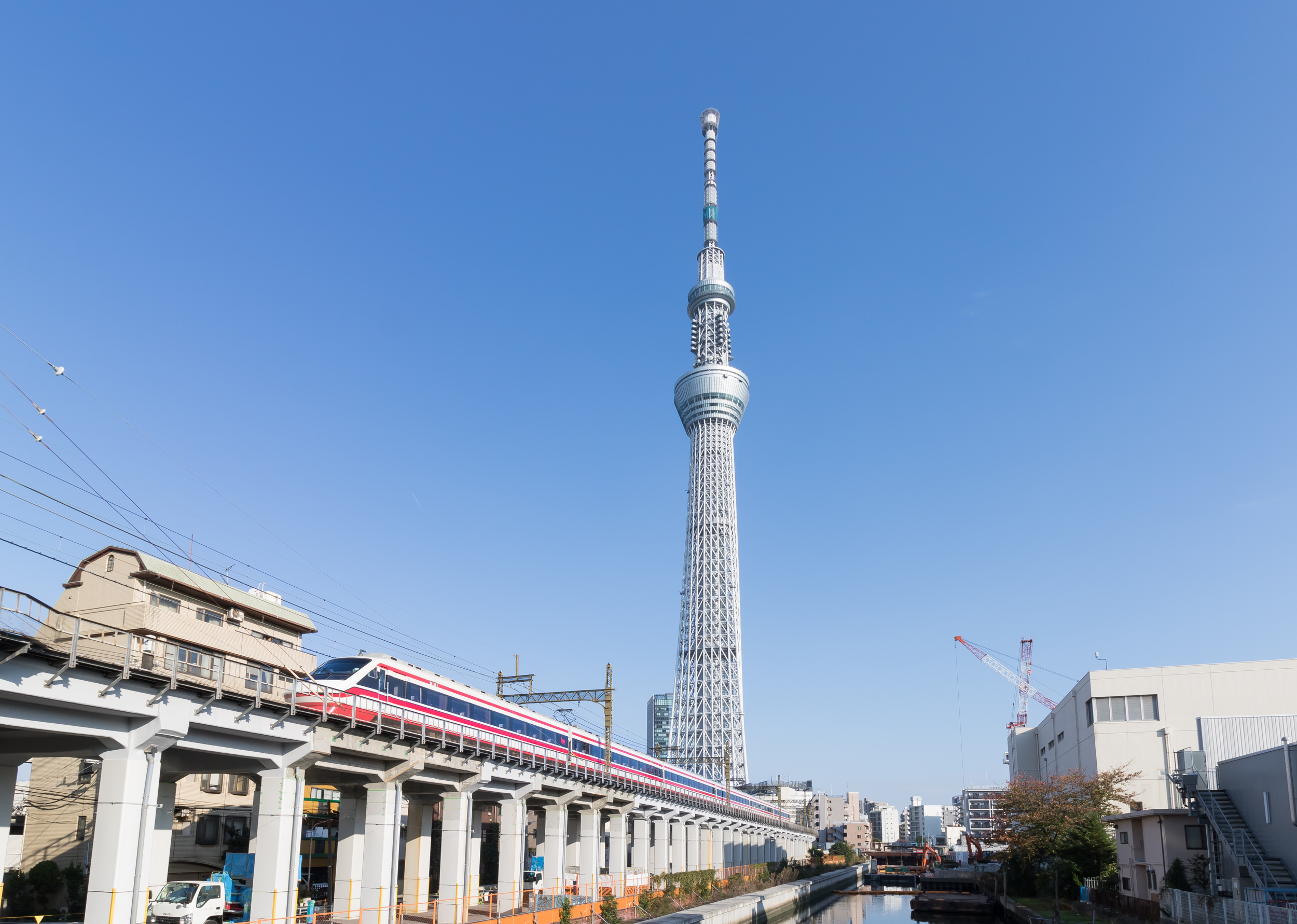
- A Tobu 200 series on the Skytree Line, with Tokyo Skytree in the background

Overview
- Other name: Isesaki Line
- Native name: 東武スカイツリーライン
- Owner: Tobu Railway Co., Ltd.
- Locale: Kantō (Tokyo and Saitama Prefecture)
- Termini: Asakusa; Tōbu-Dōbutsu-Kōen
- Stations: 30
- Website: https://www.tobu.co.jp/en/

Service
- Type: Heavy rail
- System: Tobu Railway
- Route number: TS
- Depot: Kasukabe

History
- Opened: March 17, 2012; 14 years ago

Technical
- Line length: 41.0 km (25.5 mi)
- Track gauge: 1,067 mm (3 ft 6 in)
- Electrification: Overhead line, 1,500 V DC
- Operating speed: 110 km/h (68 mph)

The Tobu Skytree Line (Japanese: 東武スカイツリーライン, Hepburn: Tōbu Sukaitsurii-rain) is a section of the Isesaki Line operated by the private railway company Tobu Railway, extending from Asakusa Station in Tokyo to Tōbu-Dōbutsu-Kōen Station in Saitama Prefecture. Some trains from the line continue to the Tokyo Metro Hibiya Line and Tokyo Metro Hanzōmon Line. This section was branded the Tobu Skytree Line on 17 March 2012 in conjunction with the opening of the Tokyo Skytree Tower (which Tobu Railway owns).

== Description ==
Track
Quadruple: Tokyo Skytree − Hikifune 1.3 km, Kita-Senju − Kita-Koshigaya 18.9 km
Double: Rest of the line

Note that Oshiage Station is officially an extension or part of Tokyo Skytree. The double tracks between Oshiage and Hikifune are thus the third and fourth tracks of the Tokyo Skytree − Hikifune section.

== Operation ==
All-stations "Local" services operate from Asakusa to Kita-Senju, and Tōbu-Dōbutsu-Kōen, and onward to Minami-Kurihashi on the Tōbu Nikkō Line. Some peak-hour Local services from Asakusa terminate at Takenotsuka, Kita-Koshigaya, or Kita-Kasukabe.

=== Through trains ===
The Skytree Line has trains that inter-run with two Tokyo Metro subway lines. One is the Tokyo Metro Hibiya Line connected at Kita-Senju, with all-station stop "Local" trains only. The other is the Tokyo Metro Hanzōmon Line at Oshiage, running as either local, semi-express or express trains within the subway line and the Tokyu Denentoshi line. Beyond Shibuya, the terminus of the Hanzomon Line, nearly all trains continue to and from the Tokyu Den-en-toshi Line, down to the terminus of Chūō-Rinkan.

To the north, trains run via the Yagan Railway to the Aizu Railway's Aizutajima Station.

=== Service patterns ===
Stops and operated sections are as of 2020.

Local (普通, Futsū) (announced as Kakueki Teisha (各駅停車) or kakutei (各停) for short) (L)
- Asakusa − Kita-Senju. 6 cars.
- Naka-Meguro of Tokyo Metro Hibiya Line − Kita-Senju − Takenotsuka - Kita-Koshigaya - Kita-Kasukabe - Tobu-Dobutsu-Koen - Minami-Kurihashi. 7 cars.
Section Semi-Express (区間準急, Kukan Junkyū) (SSE)
Between Asakusa and Kita-Koshigaya, Kita-Kasukabe, Tōbu-Dōbutsu Kōen, Kuki, Tatebayashi (Isesaki Line) or Minami-Kurihashi (Nikkō Line). 6 cars.
Semi-Express (準急, Junkyū) (SmE)
Early morning and late night. Down to Kita-Koshigaya, Tōbu-Dōbutsu-Kōen, Kuki or to Minami-Kurihashi on the Nikkō Line through from Chūō-Rinkan on the Tokyu Den-en-toshi Line via the Hanzomon Line. 10 cars.
Section Express (区間急行, Kukan Kyūkō) (SE)
Between Asakusa and Tōbu-Dōbutsu-Kōen, Kuki, Tatebayashi (Isesaki Line) or Minami-Kurihashi (Nikkō Line). 6 cars.
Express (急行, Kyūkō) (Ex)
From morning to night. Down to Tōbu-Dōbutsu-Kōen, Kuki (nearly half to Minami-Kurihashi on the Nikkō Line), through from Chūō-Rinkan on the Tokyu Den-en-toshi Line via Hanzōmon Line. 10 cars.
Limited Express (特急, Tokkyū) (LE)
Stops not shown. Charged for seat reservation and rapid service. Mainly through to the Nikkō Line for the Nikko area named Kegon (けごん), Kirifuri (きりふり), Shimotsuke (しもつけ) and Kinu (きぬ) and Revaty Kinu (リバティきぬ) and Revaty Aizu (リバティ会津) and Revaty Kegon (リバティけごん). Some through to Isesaki from Asakusa, sole direct service named Ryōmō (りょうもう) and Revaty Ryōmō (リバティりょうもう). Some through to/from Kuki from/to Ebisu on Hibiya Line, sole direct service named TH Liner (THライナー). Some through to Kasukabe from Asakusa, sole direct service named Skytree Liner (スカイツリーライナー). Some through Ōmiya/Kashiwa from Asakusa, sole direct service named Urbanpark Liner (アーバンパークライナー).

== Stations ==
Video from a Tobu 10000 series train near Sengendai Station, October 2012

- S: Stop
- *1: To Naka-Meguro on Tokyo Metro Hibiya Line.
- *2: To Chūō-Rinkan on Tokyu Den-en-toshi Line via Tokyo Metro Hanzomon Line
- *3: Through to Nikkō Line
- *4: Through to Isesaki Line
- *5: Terminating Services from Naka-Meguro on the Tokyo Metro Hibiya Line
- *6: Terminating Services from Chūō-Rinkan on Tokyu Den-en-toshi Line via Tokyo Metro Hanzomon Line
- KN・KG: The stations which are marked "KN・KG" are stopped by Limited Express Kinu and Kegon trains
- RM: The stations which are marked "RM" are stopped by Limited Express Ryomo trains
- RV RM: The stations which are marked "RV RM" are stopped by Limited Express Revaty Kinu and Revaty Kegon and Revaty Aizu and Revaty Ryomo trains
- RV KG・KN: The stations which are marked "RV RM" are stopped by Limited Express Revaty Kinu, Revaty Kegon and Revaty Aizu trains
- SL: The stations which are marked "SL" are stopped by Limited Express Skytree Liner trains
- TH: The stations which are marked "TH" are stopped by Limited Express TH Liner trains
- *Limited Express: Limited Express which are marked * travel to Asakusa stop at Hikifune station in the morning and they travel to Kasukabe or Tōbu-Dōbutsu-Kōen direction stop at Hikifune Station in the evening.

No.	Station	Distance in km (mi)	Local		Section Semi Exp.	Semi Exp.	Section Exp.	Express	Limited Exp.	Transfers	Location	
TS01	Asakusa 浅草	0 (0)	●	*1	●	*2	●	*2	KN・KG/RM/RV KN・KG/RV RM/SL	Ginza Line (G-19); Asakusa Line (A-18); Tsukuba Express (TX03) (Note: Due to the distance between the Skytree Line and the Tsukuba Express at Asakusa, transfers for the Tsukuba Express are instead announced at Kita-Senju.)	Taitō	Tokyo
TS02	Tokyo Skytree とうきょうスカイツリー	1.1 (0.68)	●	*1	●	*2	●	*2	KN・KG/RM/RV KN・KG/RV RM/SL (Note: When boarding at Tokyo Skytree, a limited express ticket is not required to board a limited express train to Asakusa.)		Sumida	Tokyo
TS03	(Oshiage) 押上	—N/a		*1	|	●	|	●		Hanzōmon Line (Z-14); Asakusa Line (A-20); Oshiage Line (KS45)	Sumida	Tokyo
TS04	Hikifune 曳舟	2.4 (1.5)	●	*1	●	●	●	●	*KN・KG/*RM/*RV RM/*RV KG・KN/SL	Kameido Line (TS04)	Sumida	Tokyo
TS05	Higashi-Mukōjima 東向島	3.2 (2.0)	●	*1	●	|	●	|	|		Sumida	Tokyo
TS06	Kanegafuchi 鐘ヶ淵	4.2 (2.6)	●	*1	●	|	●	|	|		Sumida	Tokyo
TS07	Horikiri 堀切	5.3 (3.3)	●	*1	●	|	●	|	|		Adachi	Tokyo
TS08	Ushida 牛田	6.0 (3.7)	●	*1	●	|	●	|	|	Main Line (Keisei Sekiya: KS06)	Adachi	Tokyo
TS09	Kita-Senju 北千住	7.1 (4.4)	●	●	●	●	●	●	KN・KG/RM/RV RM/RV KN・KG/TH	Hibiya Line (H-22); Chiyoda Line (C-18); Jōban Line (Rapid) (JJ05); Tsukuba Express (TX05)	Adachi	Tokyo
TS10	Kosuge 小菅	8.2 (5.1)		●	|	|	|	|	|		Adachi	Tokyo
TS11	Gotanno 五反野	9.3 (5.8)		●	|	|	|	|	|		Adachi	Tokyo
TS12	Umejima 梅島	10.5 (6.5)		●	|	|	|	|	|		Adachi	Tokyo
TS13	Nishiarai 西新井	11.3 (7.0)		●	●	●	●	●	|	Daishi Line (TS13)	Adachi	Tokyo
TS14	Takenotsuka 竹ノ塚	13.4 (8.3)		●	|	|	|	|	|		Adachi	Tokyo
TS15	Yatsuka 谷塚	15.9 (9.9)		●	|	|	|	|	|		Sōka	Saitama
TS16	Sōka 草加	17.5 (10.9)		●	●	●	●	●	|		Sōka	Saitama
TS17	Dokkyodaigakumae 獨協大学前	19.2 (11.9)		●	|	|	|	|	|		Sōka	Saitama
TS18	Shinden 新田	20.5 (12.7)		●	|	|	|	|	|		Sōka	Saitama
TS19	Gamō 蒲生	21.9 (13.6)		●	|	|	|	|	|		Koshigaya	Saitama
TS20	Shin-Koshigaya 新越谷	22.9 (14.2)		●	●	●	●	●	TH	Musashino Line (Minami-Koshigaya: JM22)	Koshigaya	Saitama
TS21	Koshigaya 越谷	24.4 (15.2)		●	●	●	●	●	|		Koshigaya	Saitama
TS22	Kita-Koshigaya 北越谷	26.0 (16.2)		●	●	●	|	|	|		Koshigaya	Saitama
TS23	Ōbukuro 大袋	28.5 (17.7)		●	●	●	|	|	|		Koshigaya	Saitama
TS24	Sengendai せんげん台	29.8 (18.5)		●	●	●	●	●	SL/TH		Koshigaya	Saitama
TS25	Takesato 武里	31.1 (19.3)		●	●	●	|	|	|		Kasukabe	Saitama
TS26	Ichinowari 一ノ割	33.0 (20.5)		●	●	●	|	|	|		Kasukabe	Saitama
TS27	Kasukabe 春日部	35.3 (21.9)		●	●	●	●	●	KN・KG/RV KG・KN/SL/TH	Tōbu Urban Park Line (TD10)	Kasukabe	Saitama
TS28	Kita-Kasukabe 北春日部	36.8 (22.9)		●	●	●		|	|		Kasukabe	Saitama
TS29	Himemiya 姫宮	38.4 (23.9)		●	●	●	|	|	|		Miyashiro	Saitama
TS30	Tōbu-Dōbutsu-Kōen 東武動物公園	41.0 (25.5)		● *3/*5	● *3/*4	● *3/*4/*6	● *3/*4	● *3/*4/*6	RM/RV RM/TH	Isesaki Line (TS30); Nikkō Line (TS30)	Miyashiro	Saitama

== Rolling stock ==
=== Current ===
As of July 15 2023

- Tobu 10000 series (since 1984)
- Tobu 100 series (6-car EMUs, since 1990)
- Tobu 200 series (6-car EMUs, since 1991)
- Tobu 500 series (3-car EMUs, since 21 April 2017)
- Tobu N100 series (6-car EMUs, since 15 July 2023)
- Tobu 50000 series (10-car EMUs, since 2020)
- Tobu 50050 series (10-car EMUs, since 2006)
- Tobu 70000 series (7-car EMUs, since 7 July 2017)
- Tobu 70090 series (7-car EMUs, since 2020, used as TH Liner)
- Tokyo Metro 18000 series (10-car EMUs, since 7 August 2021)
- Tokyo Metro 08 series (10-car EMUs, since 2003)
- Tokyo Metro 8000 series (10-car EMUs, since 1981, started scrapping in August 2021)
- Tokyo Metro 13000 series (7-car EMUs, since 25 March 2017)
- Tokyu 2020 series (10-car EMUs, since 1 October 2018)
- Tokyu 5000 series (10-car EMUs, since 2002)
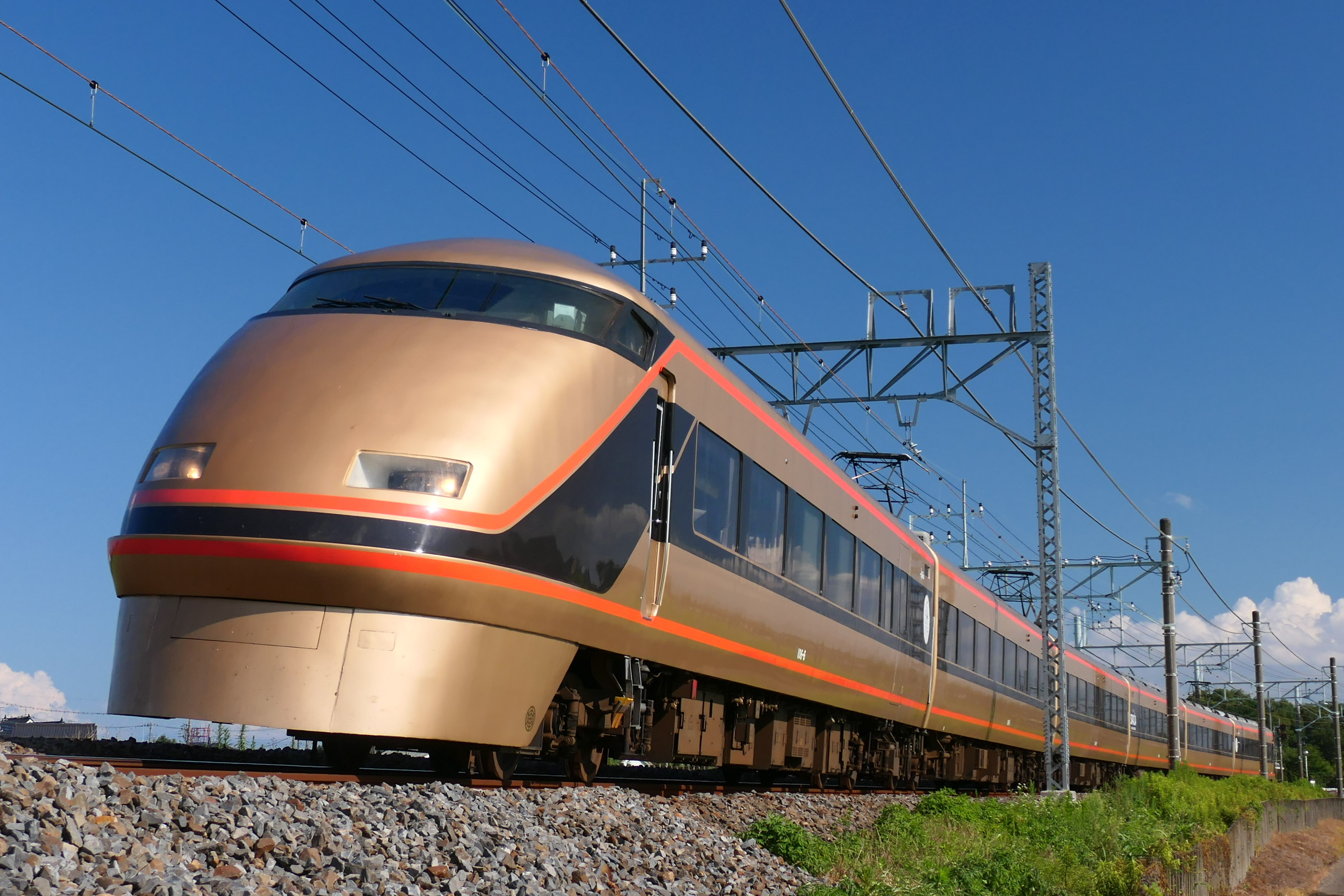
Tobu 100 series

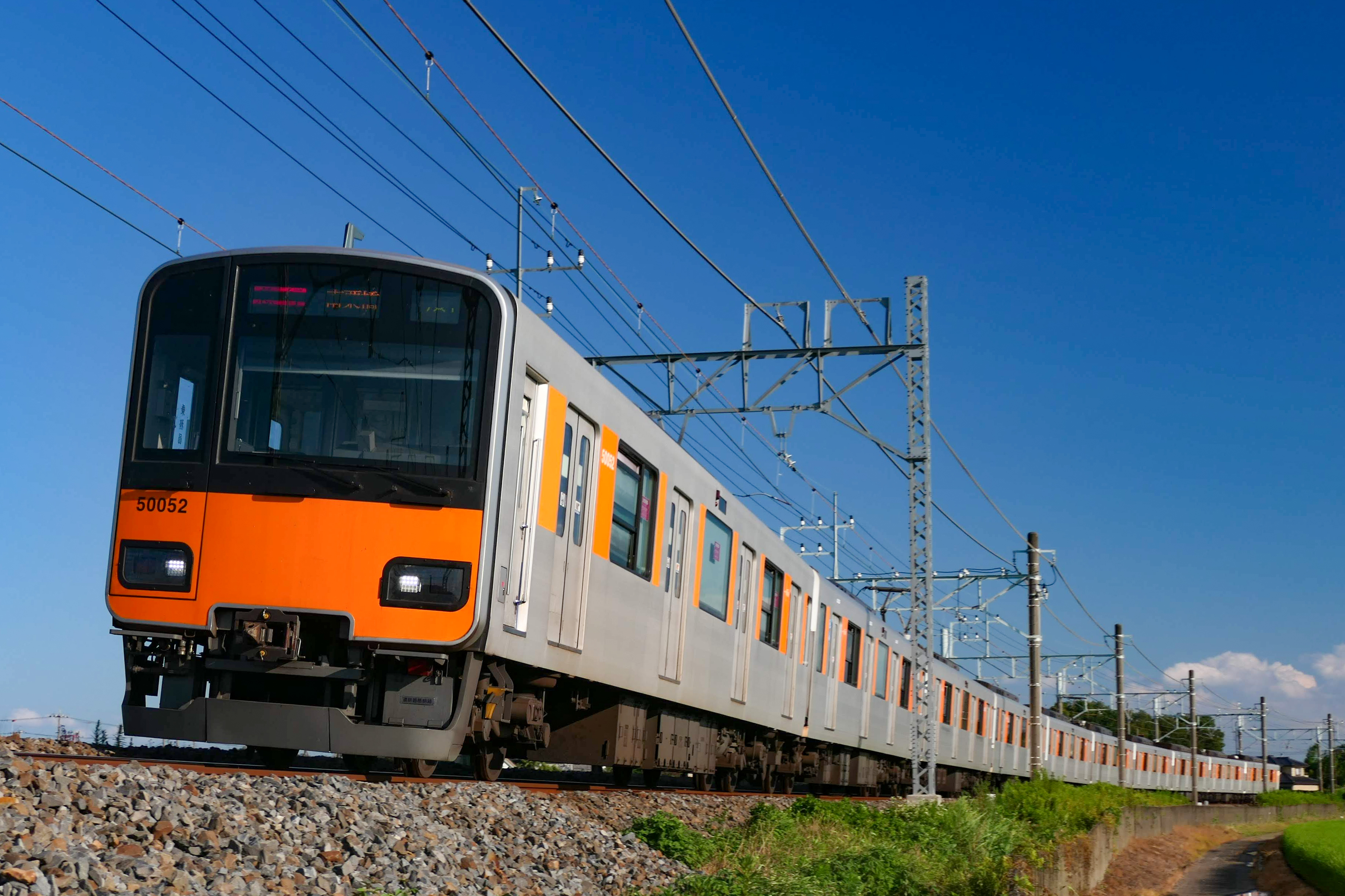
Tobu 50050 series

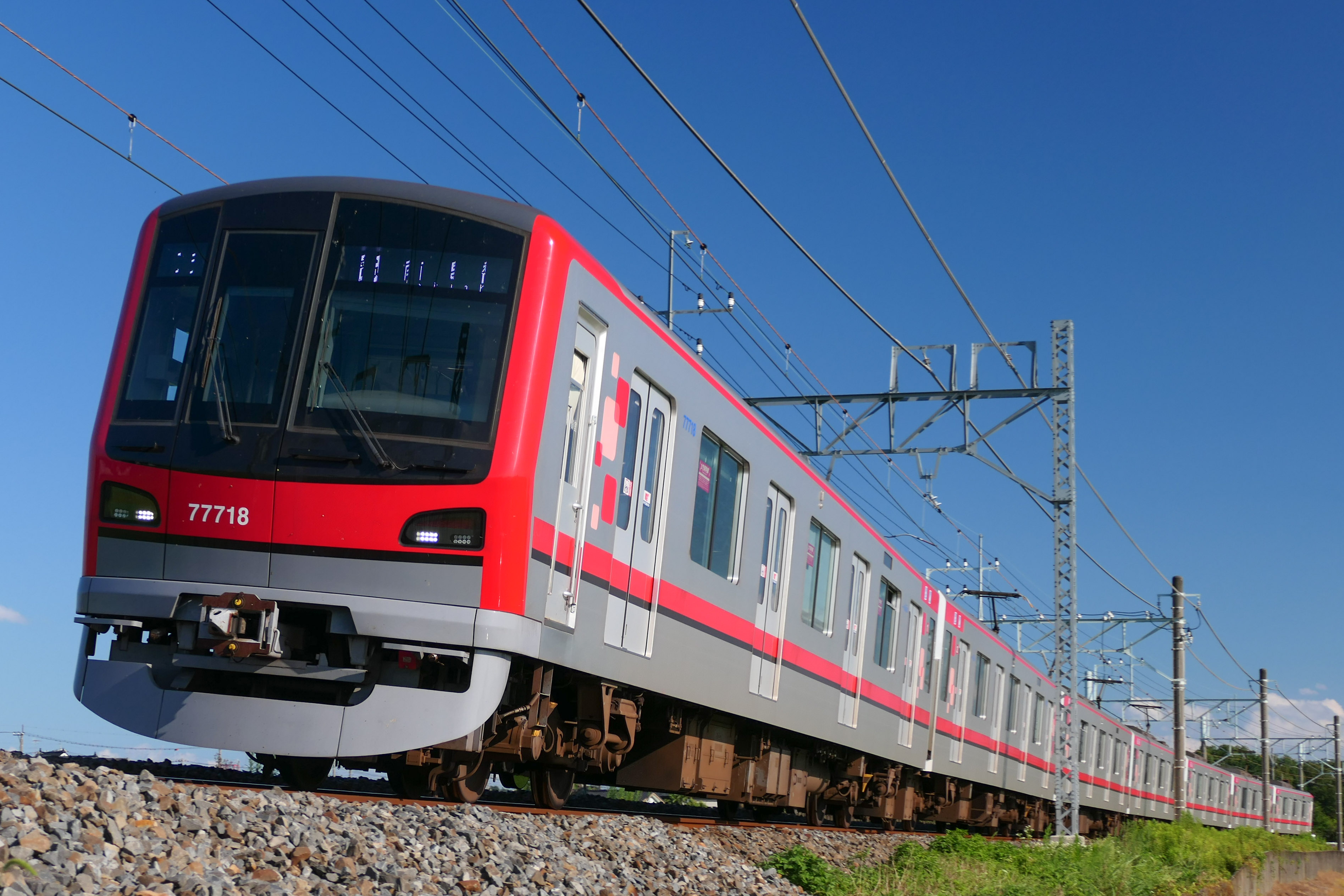
Tobu 70000 series

=== Former ===
- Tokyo Metro 03 series (8-car EMUs, from 1988 to 2020)
- Tokyu 8500 series (10-car EMUs, from 1975 to 2023)
- Tobu 20000 series (8-car EMUs, from 1988 to 2020)
- Tobu 30000 series (4/6/10-car EMUs, from 1997 to 2021)
- Tobu 300 series
- Tobu 1800 series

== History ==
The first section of the Isesaki Line was opened by the present company in 1899 between Kita-Senju and Kuki utilising steam motive power. In 1902, Tobu extended the line south to have a maritime connection at present Tokyo Skytree (then Azumabashi (吾妻橋), later renamed Asakusa) in downtown Tokyo, and north to Kazo. The following year a further northern extension to Kawamata (then on the south bank of Tone River) was opened. Further northward extension progressed, and in 1910 the line arrived at Isesaki. In 1931, a bridge over the Sumida River was built and present Asakusa Station (then Asakusa Kaminarimon (浅草雷門)) opened as part of the department store building, the entire line being completed.

The Asakusa to Nishiarai section was double-tracked in 1912, and the rest of the line was double-tracked between 1920 and 1927, except for the Hanyu to Kawamata section, which was double-tracked when a second bridge was built over the Tonegawa in 1992.

Electrification started in 1924 on the section of Asakusa and Nishiarai, and in 1927 completed as far as Isesaki. The distance of over 100 km was then one of the longest electrified railway lines together with the present Kintetsu Osaka Line and Yamada Lines.

After World War II, the Tobu Lines had no connection to the Yamanote Line or other major lines of the then Japanese National Railways (JNR) to offer efficient transfers to central Tokyo. The sole connection was with the Jōban Line at Kitasenju, which offered poor access to central Tokyo. To solve the inefficiencies of transfers at Kitasenju and notoriously narrow Asakusa, in 1962, the Hibiya Line of the then Teito Rapid Transport Authority (帝都高速度交通営団, Teito Kōsokudo Kōtsū Eidan), known as TRTA, present Tokyo Metro) was built, connecting at Kitasenju.

Further growing traffic required Tobu to build a second through line to Tokyo Metro Hanzomon Line in the 1990s. In 2003, the company built new tracks from Hikifune to connect at Oshiage, officially an annex station of Tokyo Skytree.

From the 3 March 2006, timetable revision, less than half of trains originated or terminated at Asakusa, with more trains operating through to Tokyo Metro subway lines.

From 17 March 2012, the section south of Tōbu-Dōbutsu-Kōen was rebranded as the Tobu Skytree Line.

The former Skytree Train and Kirifuri limited express, Rapid, and Section Rapid services were discontinued from the start of the revised timetable on 21 April 2017.

== See also ==
- List of railway lines in Japan
