= Kita-Koshigaya Station =

Railway station in Koshigaya, Saitama Prefecture, Japan

TS22 Kita-Koshigaya Station 北越谷駅
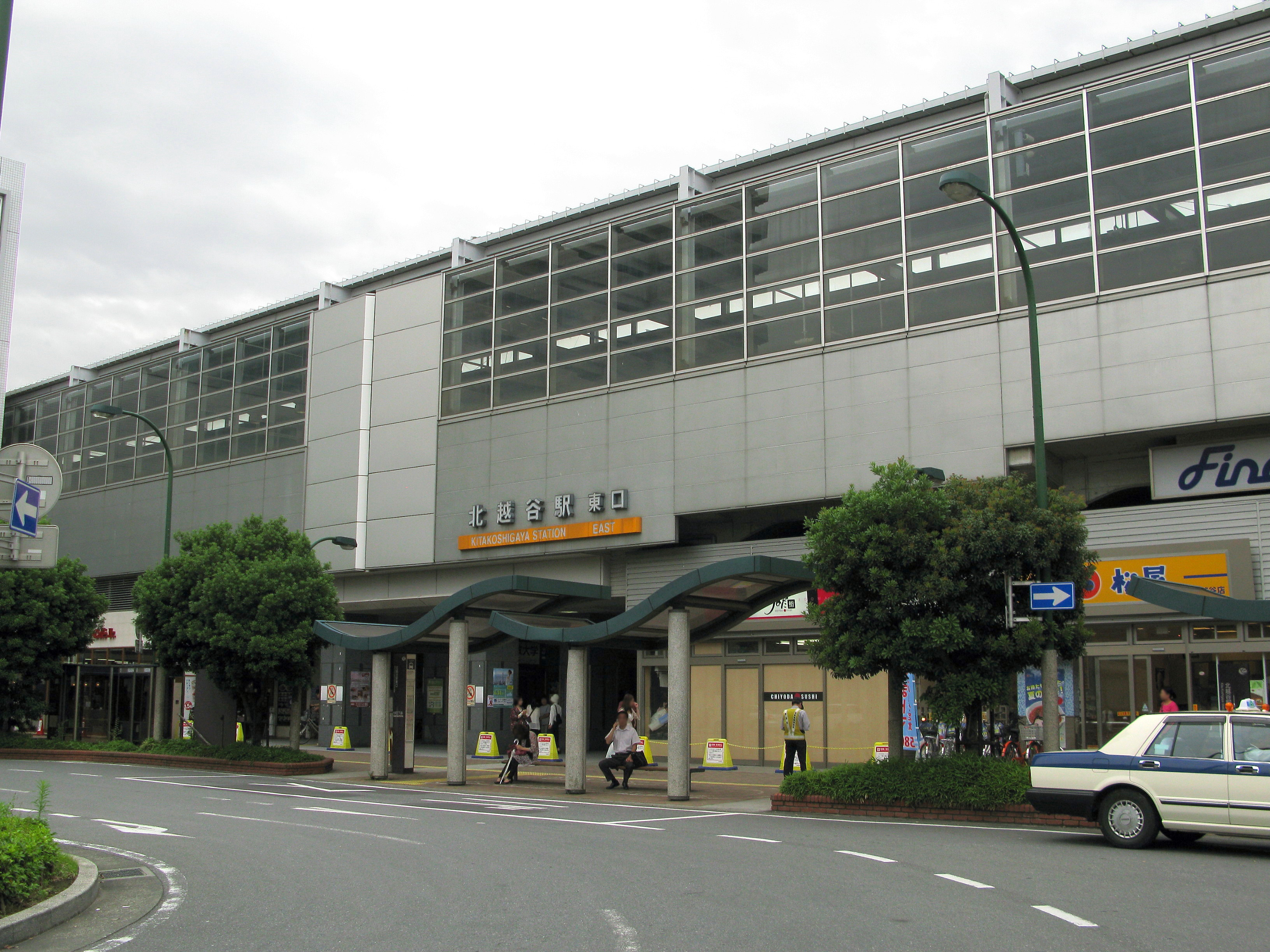
- Kita-Koshigaya Station east side in June 2012

General information
- Location: 3-4-23 Ōsawa, Koshigaya-shi, Saitama-ken 343-0025; Japan
- Coordinates: 35.9019°N 139.7800°E
- Operator: Tōbu Railway
- Line: Tōbu Skytree Line
- Distance: 26.0 km from Asakusa
- Platforms: 2 island platforms
- Tracks: 4
- Connections: Bus terminal

Other information
- Station code: TS-22
- Website: Official website

History
- Opened: 27 August 1899
- Former names: Koshigaya Station (1899-1911); Bushū-Ōsawa Station (1911-1956)

Passengers
- FY2024: 24,248 daily boardings

Services
Preceding station	Tobu Railway	Following station
Koshigaya TS21 towards Oshiage	Tobu Skytree Line Semi Express	Ōbukuro TS23 towards Tōbu-Dōbutsu-Kōen
Koshigaya TS21 towards Asakusa	Tobu Skytree Line Section Semi Express Local	Ōbukuro TS23 towards Tōbu-Dōbutsu-Kōen
Location
- Location within Saitama Prefecture Location within Japan

Kita-Koshigaya Station (北越谷駅, Kita-Koshigaya-eki) is a passenger railway station located in the city of Koshigaya, Saitama, Japan, operated by the private railway operator Tōbu Railway.

== Lines ==
Kita-Koshigaya Station is served by the Tōbu Skytree Line (Tōbu Isesaki Line) from Asakusa in Tokyo, and is 26.0 km from the line's terminus at Asakusa. Through services also operate to and from Naka-Meguro via the Tokyo Metro Hibiya Line, and Shibuya and Chūō-Rinkan via the Tokyo Metro Hanzōmon Line and Tokyu Den-en-toshi Line.

== Station layout ==
The station consists of two elevated island platforms serving four lines, with the station building located underneath.

=== Platforms ===
1	Tōbu Skytree Line	for Kita-Senju, Hikifune, and Asakusa; Tokyo Metro Hanzomon Line for Shibuya; Tokyu Den-en-toshi Line for Chūō-rinkan
2	Tōbu Skytree Line	for Kita-Senju, Hikifune, and Asakusa; Tokyo Metro Hibiya Line for Ueno and Naka-meguro
3	Tōbu Skytree Line	for Kasukabe and Tōbu-Dōbutsu-Kōen; Tobu Nikko Line for Minami-Kurihashi
4	Tōbu Skytree Line	for Kasukabe and Tōbu-Dōbutsu-Kōen; Tobu Isesaki Line for Kuki, Tatebayashi and Ōta; Tōbu Nikkō Line for Minami-Kurihashi

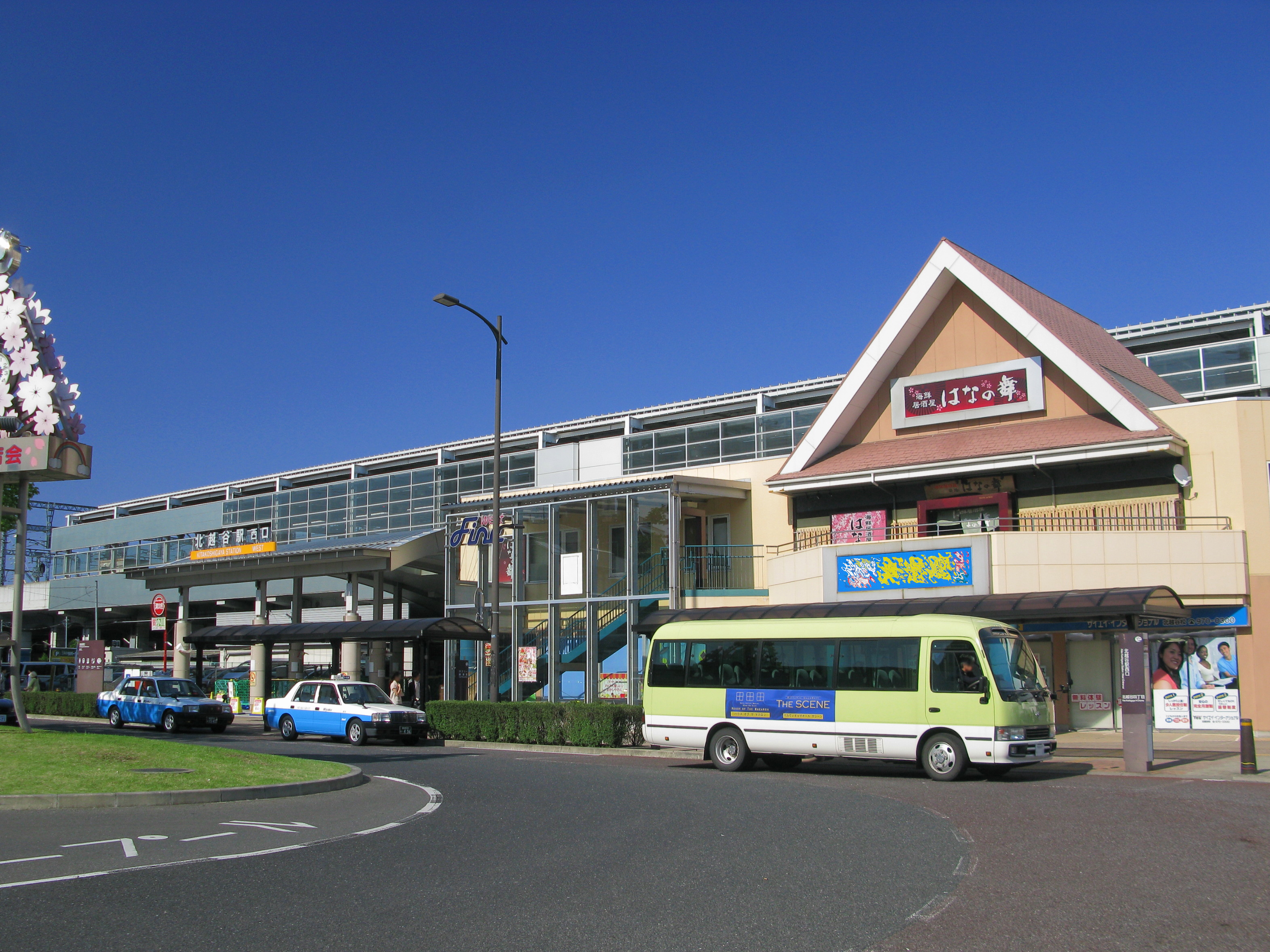
The west entrance in June 2012

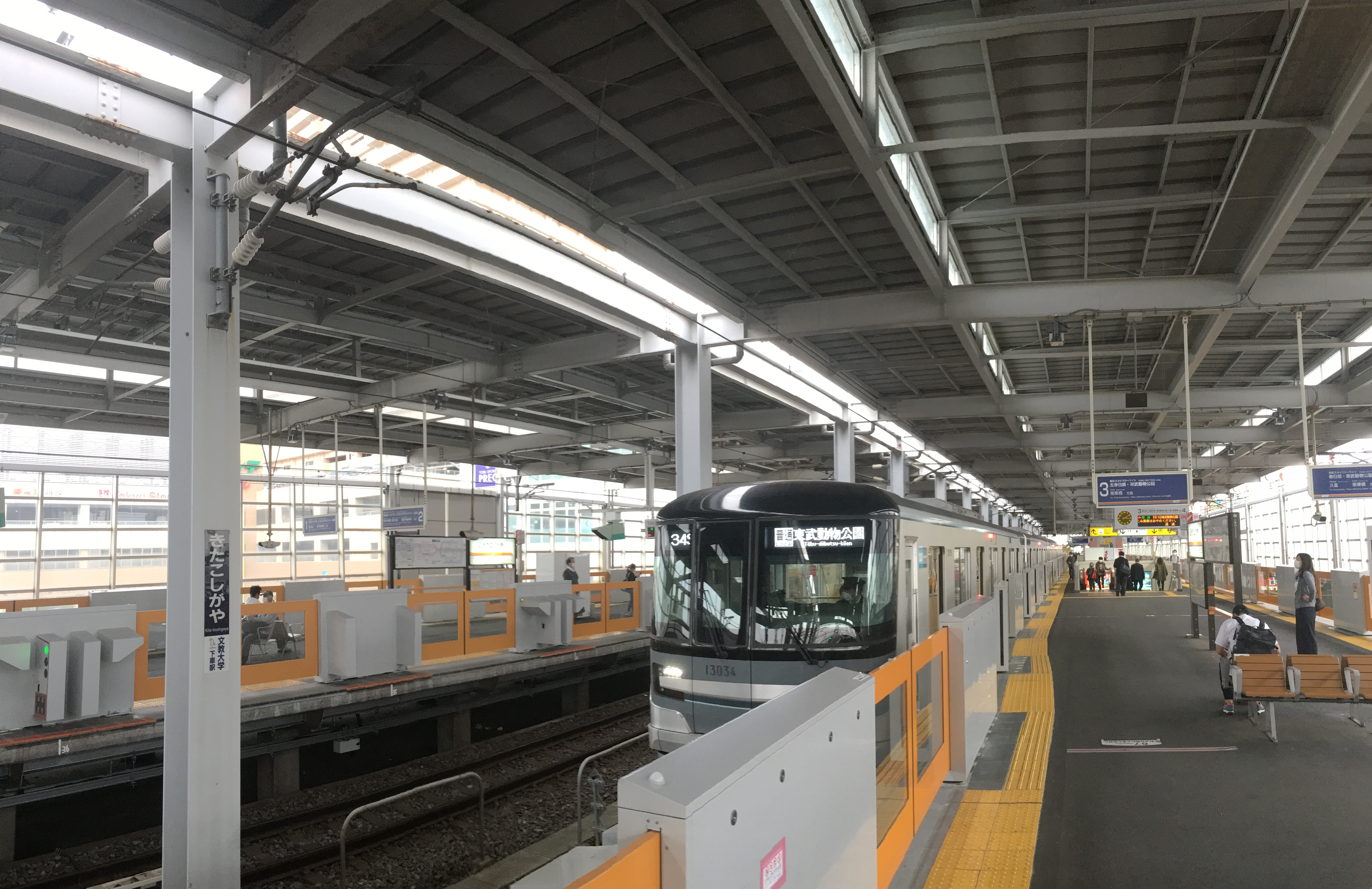
Platforms 3 and 4 in November 2020

== History ==
The station opened on 27 August 1899 as Koshigaya Station (越ヶ谷駅). It was renamed Bushū-Ōsawa Station (武州大沢駅) on 20 November 1911, and was renamed Kita-Koshigaya from 1 December 1956. From 17 March 2012, station numbering was introduced on all Tobu lines, with Kita-Koshigaya Station becoming "TS-22".

== Future developments ==
Chest-high platform edge doors are scheduled to be added by the end of fiscal 2020.

== Passenger statistics ==
In fiscal 2024, the station was used by an average of 24,248 passengers daily (boarding passengers only).

== Surrounding area ==
- Bunkyo University (Koshigaya Campus)
- Ōsawa Katori Shrine

== See also ==
- List of railway stations in Japan
