= Asakusa Station =

Railway and metro station in Tokyo, Japan

Asakusa Station 浅草駅
- Tokyo Metro exit outside Tobu station building, March 2021

Japanese name
- Shinjitai: 浅草駅
- Kyūjitai: 淺草驛
- Hiragana: あさくさえき

General information
- Location: Taitō City, Tokyo; Japan
- Operator: Tobu Railway; Tokyo Metro; Toei
- Lines: Tobu Skytree Line; Asakusa Line; Ginza Line
- Connections: Bus stop

History
- Opened: 30 December 1927; 98 years ago
Location
- Location within Tokyo wards area Location within Japan

Asakusa Station (浅草駅, Asakusa-eki) is a railway station in the Asakusa district of Taitō, Tokyo, Japan, operated by Tobu Railway, Tokyo Metro, and Toei Subway. Respectively, it serves the Tobu Skytree Line, the Ginza Line, and the Asakusa Line. It is one of the termini of the Skytree Line, and the terminus of the Ginza Line.

== Lines ==
- Tobu Railway:
  - Tobu Skytree Line
- Tokyo Metro:
  - Ginza Line
- Toei Subway:
  - Asakusa Line

== Station layout ==
The stations for the three railways within the station complex are located roughly in a north-south line: the Tobu station is located to the north of the Tokyo Metro station, which is to the north of the Toei station. There is a connecting passage between the Tobu and Tokyo Metro stations and one between the Tokyo Metro and Toei stations, but none between the Tobu and Toei stations; passengers wishing to transfer between the Tobu Railway and Toei Subway must walk at street level.

The Tsukuba Express operates a station of the same name 600 meters (2,000 ft) to the west. Passengers wishing to transfer to or from this station also must walk at street level.

=== Tobu Railway ===
TS01 Asakusa Station 浅草駅
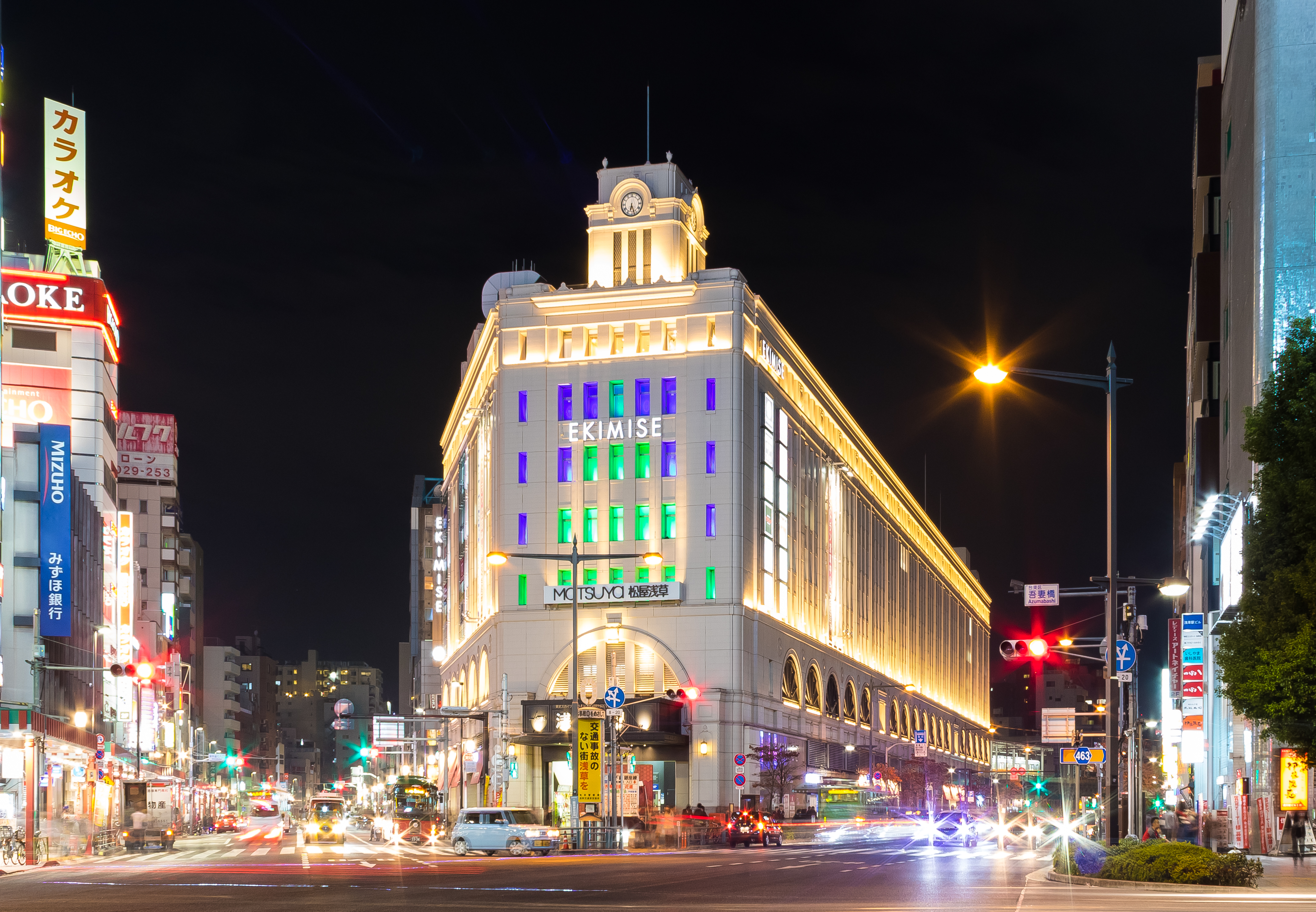
- Tobu Asakusa Station at night

General information
- Location: 1-4-1 Hanakawado, Taitō-ku, Tokyo; Japan
- Coordinates: 35°42′43.5″N 139°47′54.3″E
- System: Tobu Railway station
- Operator: Tobu Railway
- Line: Tobu Skytree Line
- Platforms: 3 island platforms
- Tracks: 4
- Connections: Bus terminal

Other information
- Station code: TS-01

History
- Opened: 25 May 1931; 95 years ago
- Former names: Asakusa Kaminarimon Station (until October 1945)

Passengers
- FY2024: 20,133 daily boardings
Services
| Preceding station | Tobu Railway | Following station |
|---|---|---|
| Terminus | Spacia X | Tokyo Skytree TS02 towards Tōbu–Nikkō or Kinugawa–Onsen |
| Terminus | Kegon | Tokyo Skytree TS02 towards Tōbu–Nikkō |
| Terminus | Kinu | Tokyo Skytree TS02 towards Kinugawa–Onsen |
| Terminus | Aizu | Tokyo Skytree TS02 towards Shin-Fujiwara |
| Terminus | Ryomo | Tokyo Skytree TS02 towards Kuzū, Akagi or Isesaki |
| Terminus | Skytree Liner | Tokyo Skytree TS02 towards Kasukabe |
| Terminus | Urban Park Liner from Asakusa | Tokyo Skytree TS02 towards Ōmiya or Kashiwa |
| Terminus | Tobu Skytree Line Section Express Section Semi Express Local | Tokyo Skytree TS02 towards Tōbu-Dōbutsu-Kōen |
Location

The Tobu Railway terminal is a surface station, which occupies a portion of the Matsuya Department Store. The station is used by local and limited express trains. Although Asakusa is the most "central" terminal of the Skytree Line, it is connected to the next major terminal, Kita-Senju Station, by a length of track with sharp curves, beginning with the first stretch leaving the station, where trains have to turn 90 degrees to the right at a maximum speed of 15 km/h (9.3 mph) to cross the Sumida River. In part due to the station's somewhat awkward location, most "Express" and "Semi-Express" services on the Skytree Line run through Oshiage to the Tokyo Metro Hanzōmon Line instead of continuing to Asakusa.

Due to the track curvature that makes the eastern end of some of the platforms narrow and dangerous, platform 1 can accommodate 8-car trains, and the other platforms can only accommodate 6-car trains. Longer trains, such as the 8-car local trains terminating on platform 2, keep the doors of the two easternmost cars closed through selective door operation.

==== Platforms ====
| 1, 2 | ■ Local | for Kita-Senju |
| 1, 2 | ■ Section Semi-Express | for Kita-Senju, Shin-Koshigaya, Kita-Koshigaya, Kasukabe, Tōbu-Dōbutsu-Kōen, Kuki, and Minami-Kurihashi |
| 1, 2 | ■ Section Express | for Kita-Senju, Shin-Koshigaya, Kasukabe, Kuki, Tōbu-Dōbutsu-Kōen, Minami-Kurihashi and Tatebayashi |
| 3, 4 | ■ Limited Express Spacia Kegon | for Tochigi and Tōbu Nikkō |
| 3, 4 | ■ Limited Express Spacia Kinu | for Tochigi and Kinugawa-onsen |
| 3, 4 | ■ Limited Express Shimotsuke | for Tochigi and Tōbu Utsunomiya |
| 3, 4 | ■ Limited Express Skytree Liner | for Kasukabe |
| 3, 4 | ■ Limited Express Urban Park Liner | for Kasukabe and Ōmiya |
| 3, 4 | ■ Limited Express Ryōmō | for Tōbu-Dōbutsu-Kōen, Kuki, Tatebayashi, Ashikagashi, Ōta, Isesaki, Akagi, and Kuzū |
| 5 | ■ Limited Express Revaty | for Kasukabe, Tōbu-Dōbutsu-Kōen, Tatebayashi, Shin-Tochigi, Tōbu Nikkō, Kinugawa-onsen, Aizukōgen-Ozeguchi, and Aizu-Tajima |

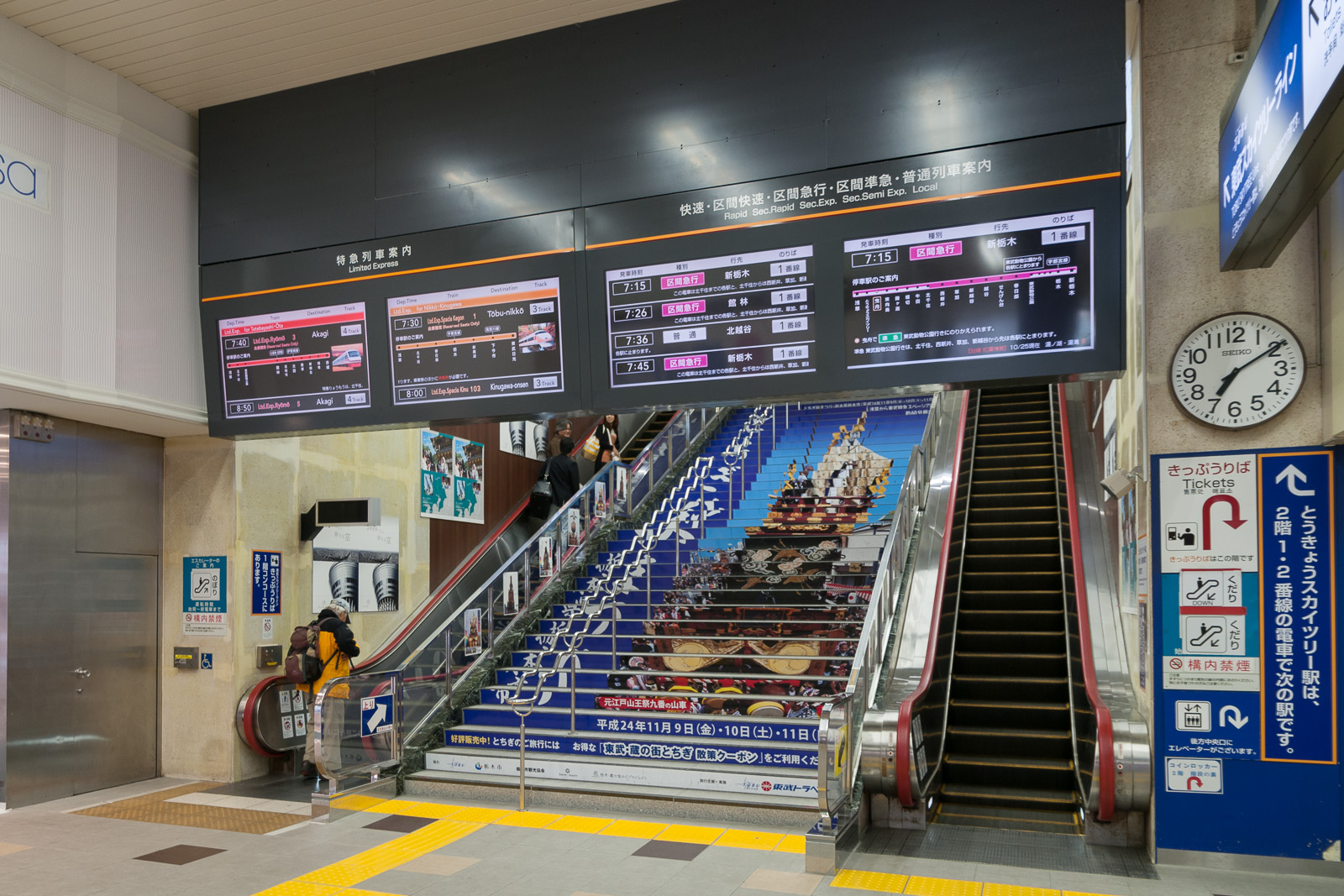
Stairways and escalators to platform

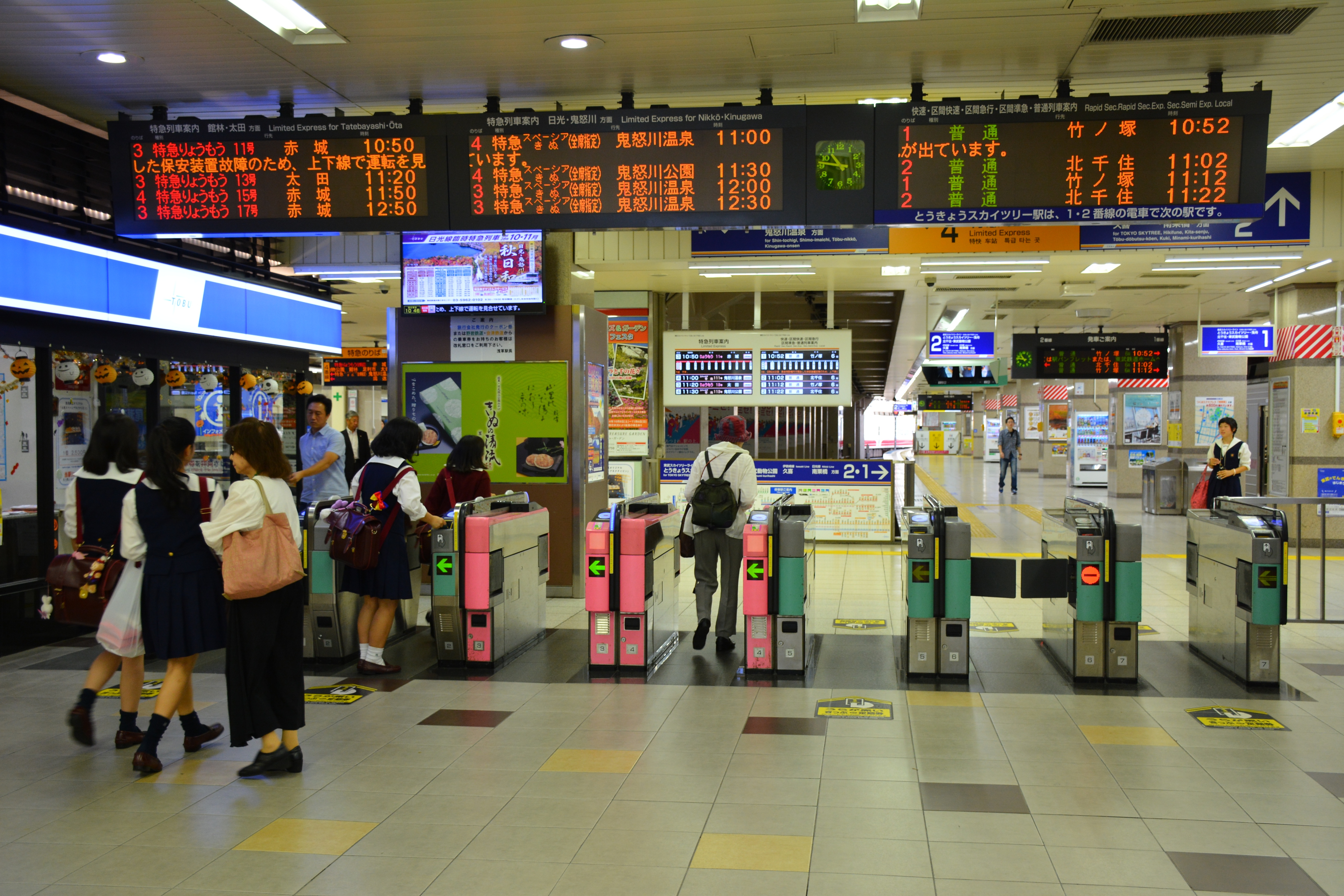
Ticket gates, 2016

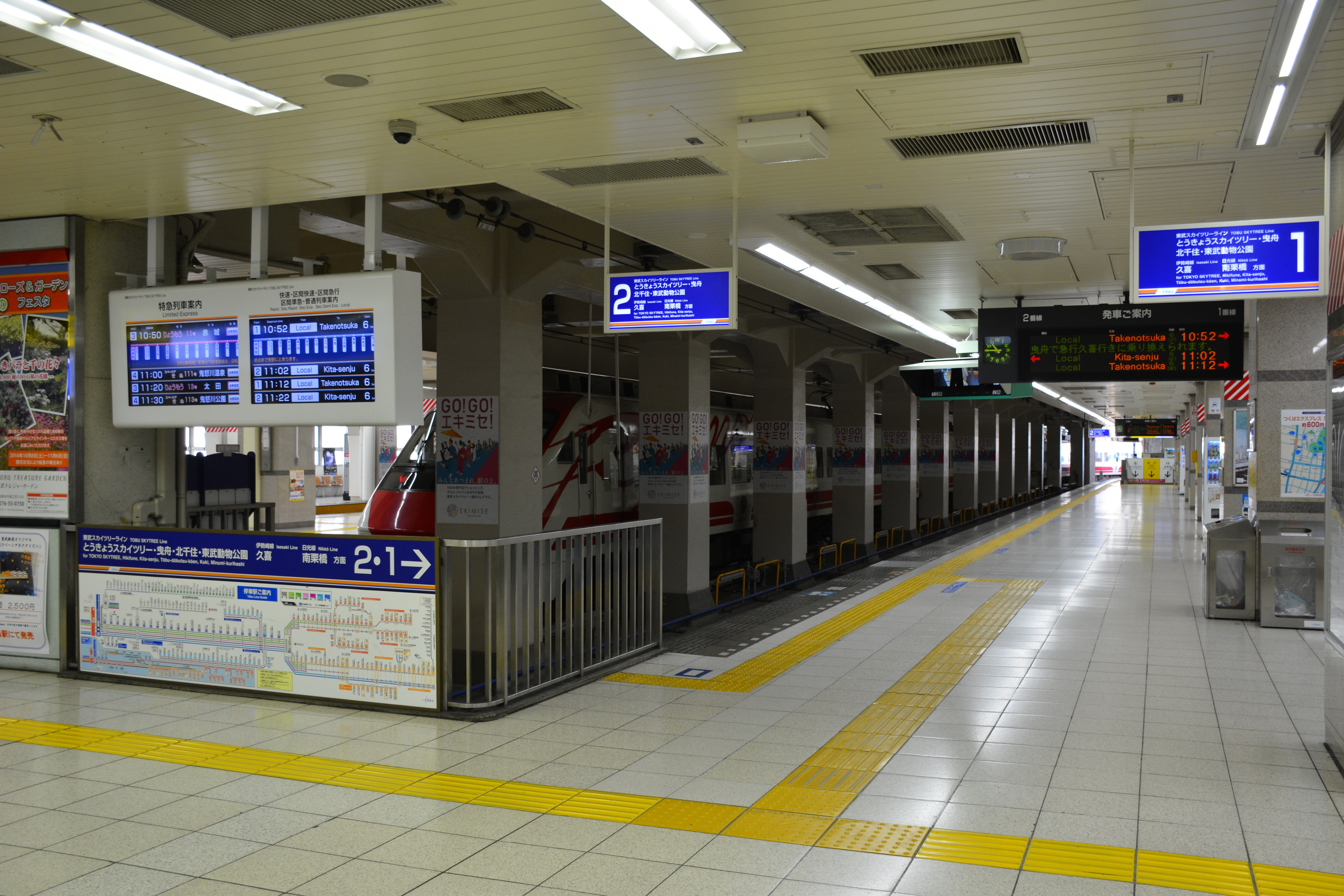
Bay platforms for limited express trains, 2016

=== Tokyo Metro ===
Asakusa Station 浅草駅

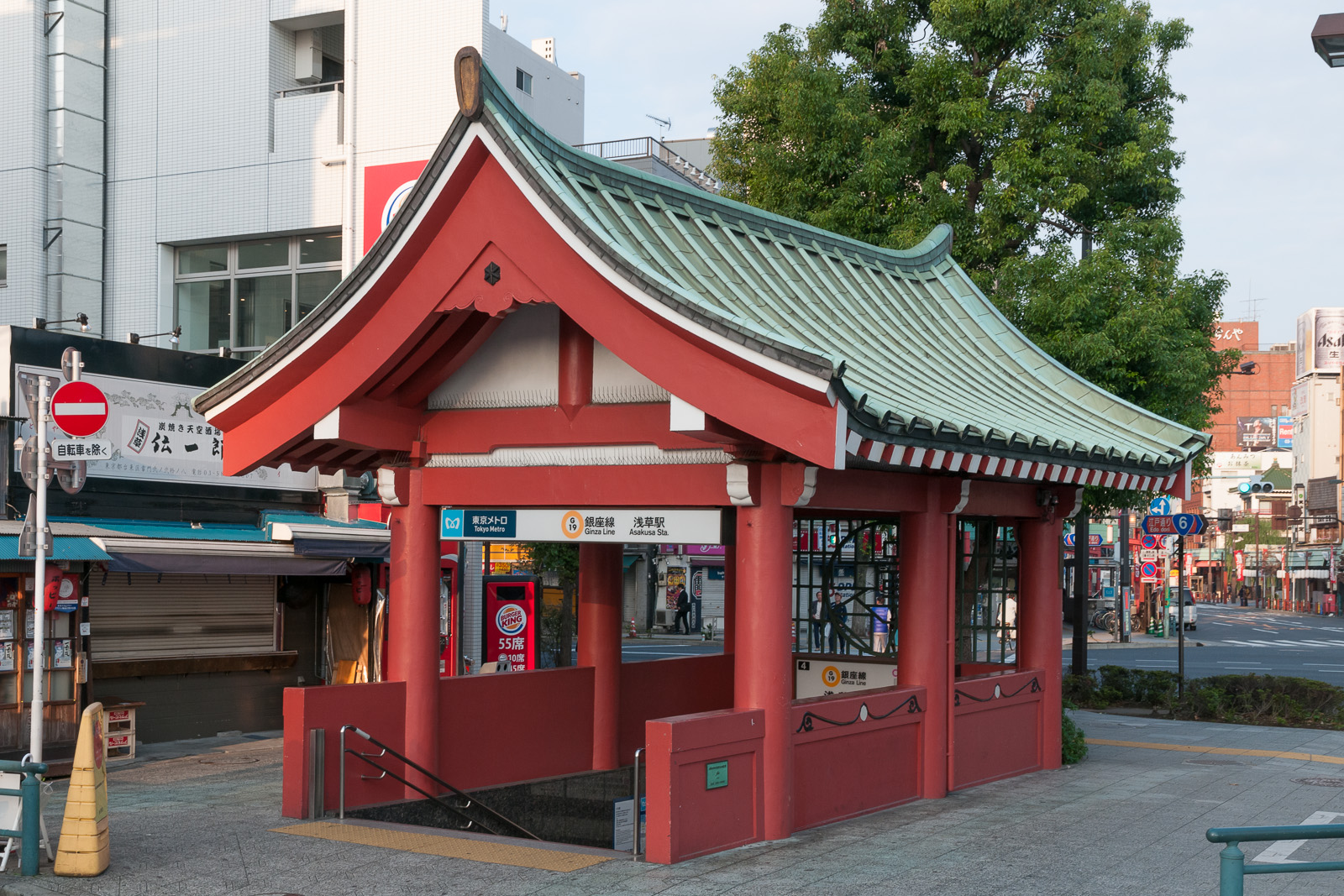
- Tokyo Metro Asakusa Station Exit 4

General information
- Location: 1-1-3 Asakusa, Taitō-ku, Tokyo; Japan
- Coordinates: 35°42′39″N 139°47′52.2″E
- System: Tokyo Metro station
- Operator: Tokyo Metro
- Line: Ginza Line
- Platforms: 2 side platforms
- Tracks: 2
- Connections: Bus terminal

Construction
- Structure type: Underground

Other information
- Station code: G-19

History
- Opened: 30 December 1927; 98 years ago

Passengers
- FY2015: 52,280 daily

Services
| Preceding station | Tokyo Metro | Following station |
|---|---|---|
| Tawaramachi towards Shibuya | Ginza Line | Terminus |
Location

The Tokyo Metro station is located underground to the south of the Tobu terminal.

==== Platforms ====
| 1/2 | Ginza Line | for Ueno, Ginza, Akasaka-mitsuke, and Shibuya |

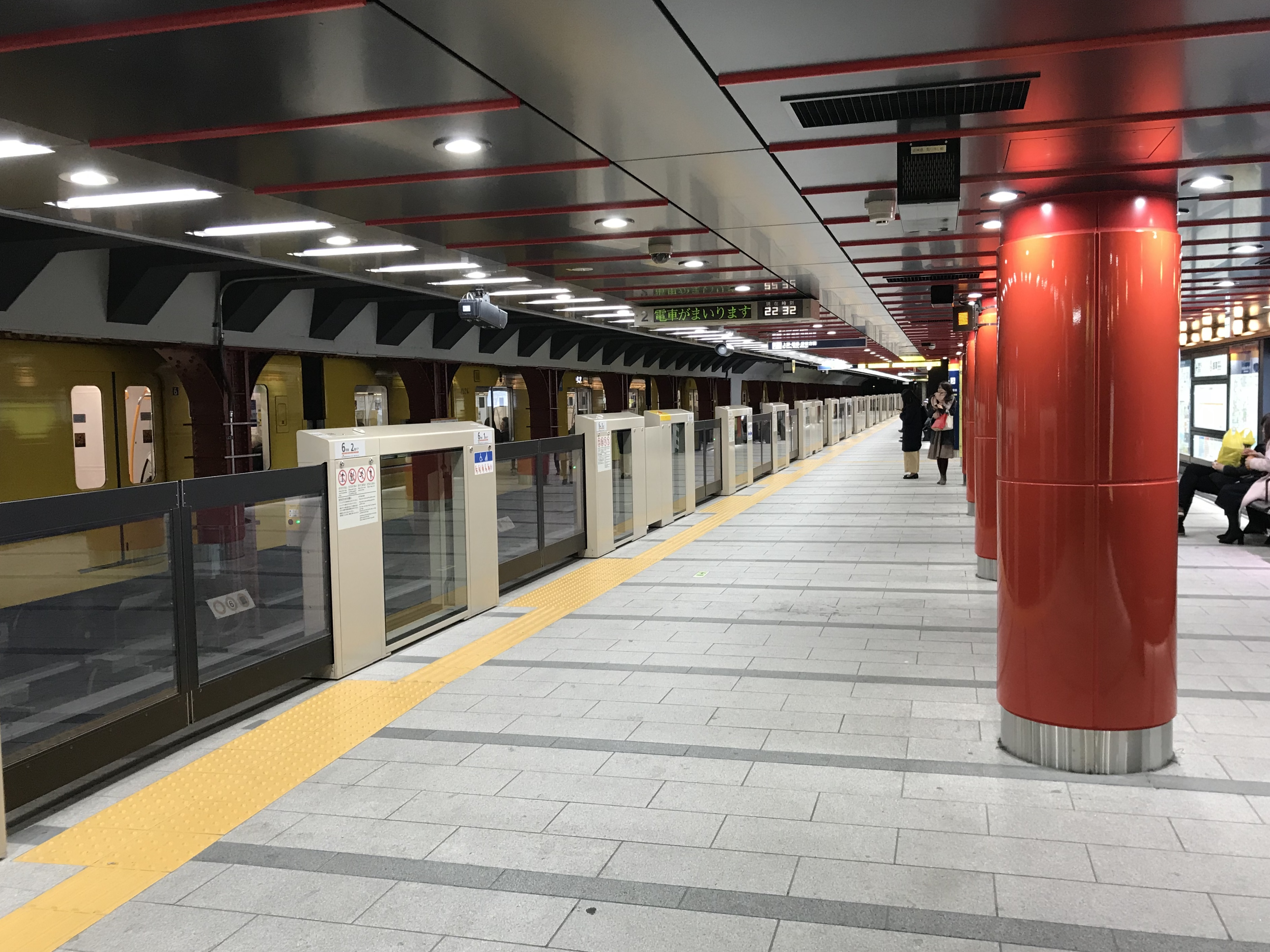
The platform in January 2018

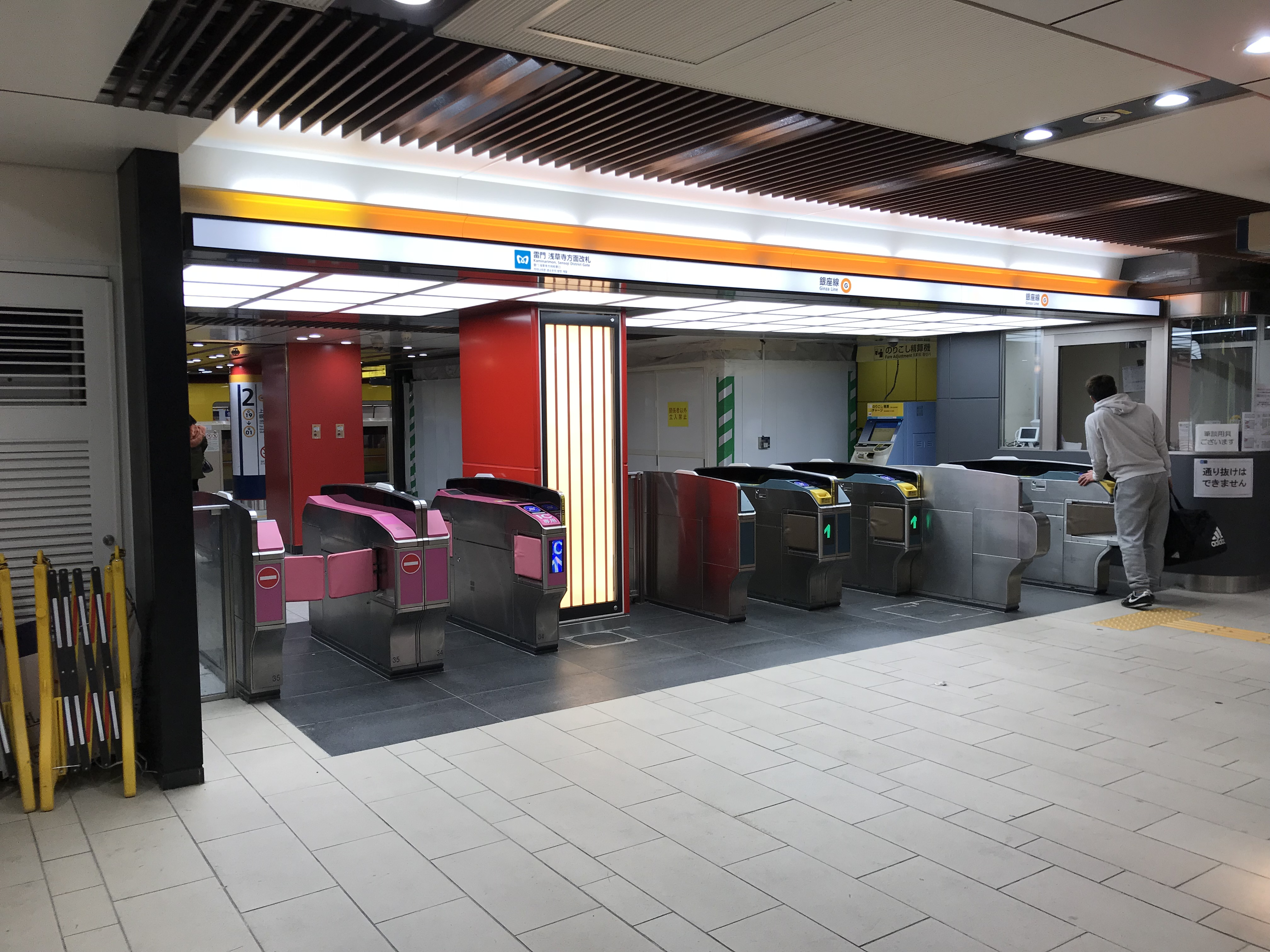
Kaminarimon, Sensoji District Gate in January 2018

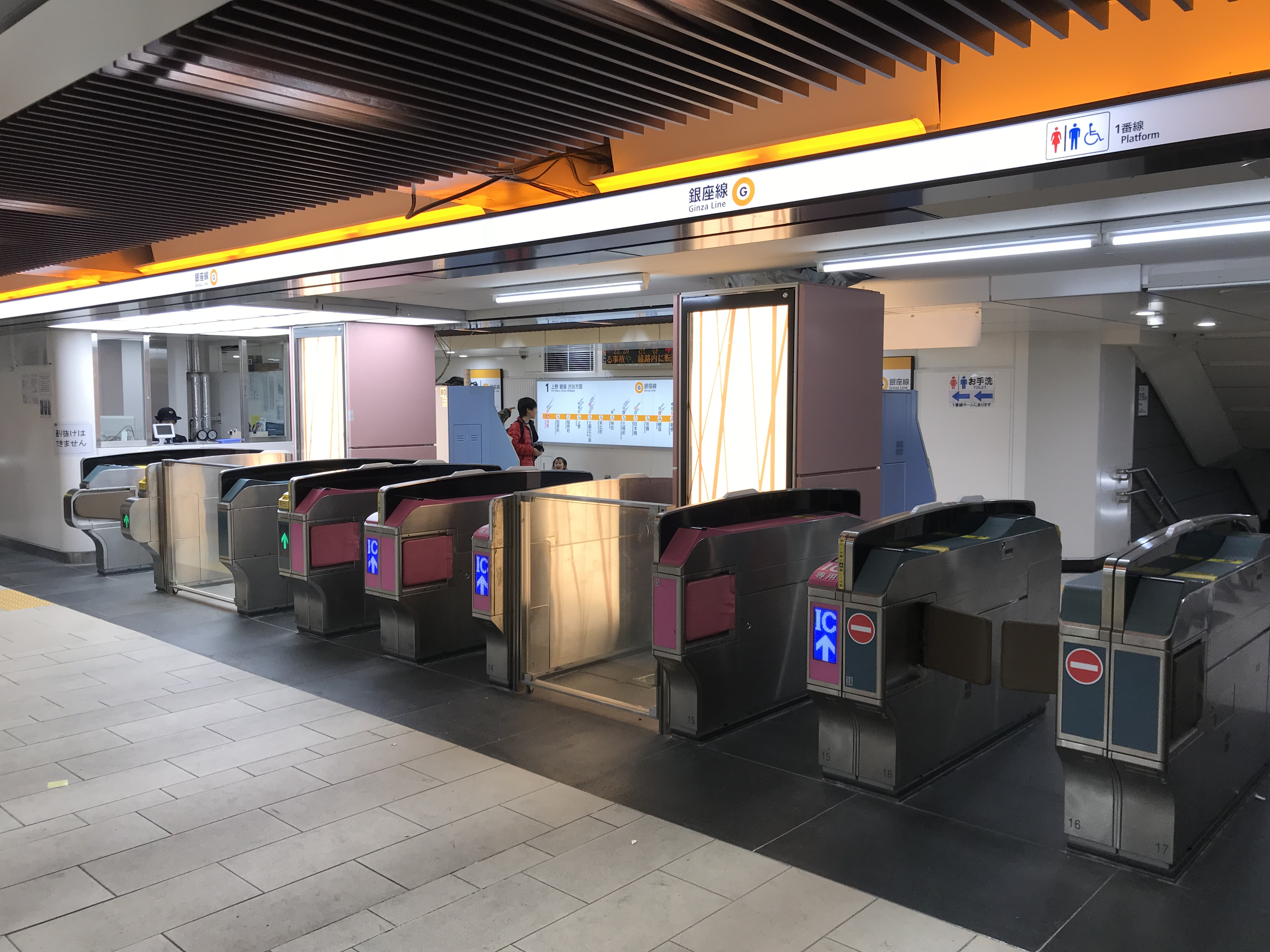
Matsuya, Sumida Park District Gate in January 2018

=== Toei ===
Asakusa Station 浅草駅

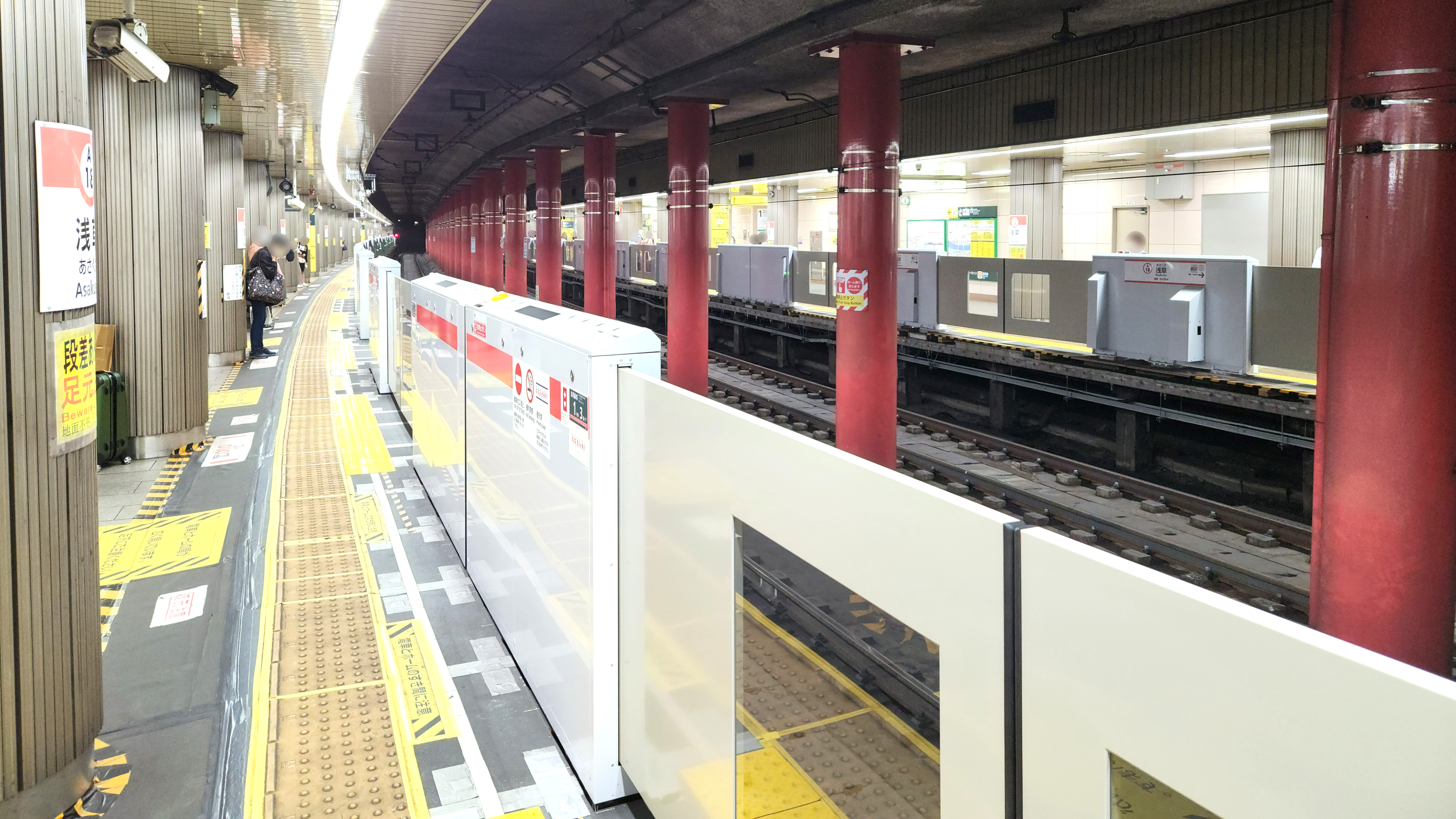
- Toei Asakusa Station platforms in June 2023

General information
- Location: 1-12-14 Komagata, Taitō-ku, Tokyo; Japan
- Coordinates: 35°42′32.3″N 139°47′47.7″E
- System: Toei station
- Operator: Toei Subway
- Line: Asakusa Line
- Platforms: 2 side platforms
- Tracks: 2
- Connections: Bus terminal

Other information
- Station code: A-18

History
- Opened: 4 December 1960; 65 years ago

Passengers
- FY2015: 52,280 daily

Services
| Preceding station | Toei Subway | Following station |
|---|---|---|
| Higashi-nihombashi towards Sengakuji | Asakusa Line Airport Limited Express | Oshiage Terminus |
| Kuramae towards Nishi-magome | Asakusa Line | Honjo-azumabashi towards Oshiage |
Location

The Toei station is located underground to the south of the Tokyo Metro station.

==== Platforms ====
| 1 | Asakusa Line | for Nihombashi, Sengakuji, and Nishi-magome; Keikyū Main Line for Shinagawa, Haneda Airport (International Terminal and Domestic Terminal), and Misakiguchi |
| 2 | Asakusa Line | for Oshiage; Keisei Main Line for Keisei Funabashi, Keisei Narita, and Narita Airport (Terminal 2·3 and Terminal 1); Narita Sky Access Line for Narita Airport; Hokusō Line for Imba Nihon-idai; Shibayama Railway Line for Shibayama-Chiyoda |

== History ==
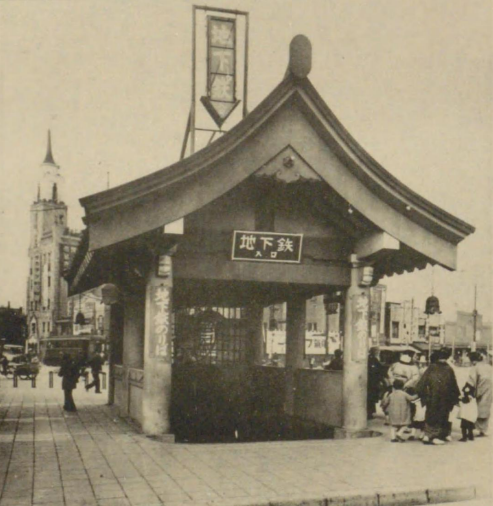
Asakusa Station Exit 4 in the 1930s

Today's Tokyo Metro Asakusa Station was one of the first underground stations in Japan, opening on 30 December 1927 as the eastern terminal of the Tokyo Underground Railway to Ueno, which was later extended to become the Tokyo Metro Ginza Line.

The Tobu Railway terminal opened on 25 May 1931 as Asakusa Kaminarimon Station (浅草雷門駅). This was renamed "Asakusa Station" on 1 October 1945.

The Toei Asakusa station opened on 4 December 1960 as part of the Toei Asakusa Line from Oshiage Station.

The station facilities of the Ginza Line were inherited by Tokyo Metro after the privatization of the Teito Rapid Transit Authority (TRTA) in 2004.

PASMO smart card coverage at this station began operation on 18 March 2007.

== Passenger statistics ==
In fiscal 2024, the Tobu Railway Asakusa station was used by an average of 20,133 passengers daily (boarding passengers only).

== See also ==
- List of railway stations in Japan
