= Nakakura =

Nakakura (written: 中倉 or 中蔵) is a Japanese surname. Notable people with the surname include:

- Akiko Nakakura (中倉 彰子, born 1977), Japanese shogi player
- Hiromi Nakakura (中倉 宏美, born 1979), Japanese shogi player
- Kiyoshi Nakakura (中倉 清, 1910–2000), Japanese kendoka, iaidoka and aikidoka
- Takashi Nakakura (中蔵 隆志, born 1977), Japanese mixed martial artist
