= Ladies Professional Shogi-players' Association of Japan =

- 日本女子プロ将棋協会
- Abbreviation: LPSA
- Formation: May 2007
- Type: Public Interest Incorporated Association
- Purpose: Promotion and development of women's shogi and shogi in general both within Japan and internationally
- Headquarters: Tokyo, Japan
- Location: 2-24-1-2F Shiba, Minato, Tokyo, Japan
- Coordinates: 35.651332°N 139.751218°E
- Members: 16
- Official language: Japanese
- Representative director: Hiromi Nakakura
- Website: joshi-shogi.com (in Japanese)

The Ladies Professional Shogi-players' Association of Japan (日本女子プロ将棋協会, Nihon Joshi Puro Shōgi Kyōkai) or LPSA is a guild of women's professional shogi players headquartered in Minato, Tokyo, Japan. The organization was established in May 2007 when a number of women's shogi professionals decided to leave the Japan Shogi Association (JSA) due to disagreements over various matters. The current representative director of the organization is Hiromi Nakakura.

== Structure ==
=== Legal status ===
The LSPA is officially registered as a public interest corporation (公益社団法人 (Kōeki Shadan Hōjin)) under Japanese law and has been as such since July 1, 2012. (Note: A public interest incorporated association is a general incorporated association that has received the authorization under "Article 4: General incorporated associations and general incorporated foundations that operate the business for public interest purposes may be authorized by the administrative agency" of the Act on Authorization of Public Interest Incorporated Associations and Public Interest Incorporated Foundation (Act No. 49 of 2006)) Prior to that, the LSPA had been officially registered first as a limited liability intermediary corporation from its founding until November 30, 2008, and then as a general incorporated association from December 1, 2008, until June 30, 2012.

=== Members ===
As of April 2024, the LPSA has eighteen members of which nine are active professionals, five are lesson (retired) professionals and four are LPSA professionals. Strong amateur female players under the age of 40 who qualify and perform well in women's professional shogi tournaments can apply to become LPSA members and receive the rank of women's professional 2-kyū. In addition, female members of the Japan Shogi Association (JSA) training group system who are promoted to Group B2 may also apply for LPSA membership. Per a 2014 agreement reached between the LPSA and JSA to cooperate and work together in matters related to women's professional shogi and shogi in general, players awarded women's professional status by either organization are recognized as such by the other.

=== Annual meetings and directors ===
The members of the LPSA meet formally once a year (they may meet more times as needed) to discuss official business and other matters relevant to the association. Five directors are elected once every two years to oversee certain aspects of the association's operations, and a representative director is selected from among the directors to act as the official representative of the association as needed. Two internal auditors as well as other persons serving as advisers or consultants assist the directors in overseeing and determining association operations.

==== List of representative directors ====
No.	Name	From	To
1	Hiroe Nakai	May 2007	May 2010
2	Sachio Ishibashi	May 2010	February 2014
3	Hiromi Nakakura	February 2014	present

== Activities ==
The LPSA sponsors a number of amateur shogi tournaments for young girls and women. It is also a cosponsor for the women's professional major title tournament the Women's Ōi.

== History ==
=== Background ===
Prior to 1974, women were given the opportunity to attempt to become regular professionals (正規棋士 seiki kishi) by trying to obtain such status via the JSA's professional shogi player apprentice school, but none were able to obtain such status. (Note: As of December 2022, no woman has been able to complete the apprentice school and obtain regular professional status, though three women (Kana Satomi, Tomoka Nishiyama and Nanami Naka) have made it as far as apprentice professional 3-dan, the last step before obtaining regular professional status. In 2022, Satomi also become the first female to qualify for the Professional Admission Test, but was unable to pass the test.) There were women such as Akiko Takojima who were members of the JSA, but they were primarily lesson professionals who helped teach others the game and appeared at shogi events or on TV as assistants to help with demonstration-board commentary as opposed to being tournament professionals that competed against their peers. The JSA, therefore, decided in 1974 to establish a separate ranking and promotion systems for women's professionals in 1974 along with the Women's Pro Meijin Tournament (女流名プロ名人位戦, Joryū Puro Meijin'isen), the first major tournament solely for women's professionals. Separate systems for amateurs aspiring to become a women's professionals were also established.

Although the upgrade to women's professional status did give women more opportunities to pursue shogi as a vocation, they were still non-voting members of the JSA who were ineligible to run for any organizational offices and generally not considered to be of the same status as regular professionals. (Note: It was not until April 2011 that some women's professionals were granted full-membership rights, but this is limited to only those ranked 4-dan and above, and those who had won a women's professional shogi major title, which is only 13 out of 63 members as of December 2022. Women's professional ranked from 2-kyu to 3-dan, however, are as of January 2022 still only considered to be associate members under current JSA bylaws.) The overall conditions for women's professionals were, in comparison to regular professionals (de facto male professionals), not as favorable despite the boost in fan support and increased media coverage that the JSA and professional shogi in general received due to the popularity of a number of young strong women's professionals, such as Naoko Hayashiba, Nakai and Ichiyo Shimizu, who started appearing in the 1980s. The JSA did establish a voluntary association called the Ladies Professional Players Group (LPPG) in 1989 for women's professionals in response to a successful event organized by women professionals to celebrate the 15th anniversary of the establishment of the women's professional system and the overall popularity of women's professionals among shogi fans, but it operated within the JSA. Dissatisfaction with the status quo grew over the years as the number of women's professionals increased, and by 2006 some women's professionals felt that the system needed to be changed.

=== Split from JSA ===
On March 8, 2006, two members of the LPPG, Nakai and Sachio Ishibashi, met with then-JSA president Kunio Yonenaga to unofficially discuss issues related to the status of women's professionals, including a request that the JSA reconsider its position on matters such as salaries and benefits, insurance, and membership in the Professional Shogi Players Group. (Note: The "Professional Shogi Players' Group" was a group within the JSA which represented the interests of "regular professionals". Since there were no women's professionals who had obtained "regular professional" status, they were not allowed to be members.) Yonenaga, however, declined their request stating that the JSA's bylaws specified that only persons graduating from the apprentice professional school can be awarded full professional status and receive its associated benefits. It was during this meeting that Nakai and Ishibashi stated that Yonenaga instructed women's professionals to seek independence if they were unsatisfied with the current state of things. (Note: Nakae's and Ishibashi's account of their meeting with Yonenaga was later disputed by the LPPG in June 2009. In official comments posted on its website, the LPPG stated that the meaning of what Yonenaga actually said had been misconstrued by Nakai and Ishibashi to further the movement towards establishing an independent organization. The LPPG further stated that any formal JSA support towards such independence would require a resolution by its board of directors.) On March 30, LPPG president Natsuko Fujimori sent out a letter to all LPPG members notifying them of the leadership's desire to become an independent organization.

On April 14, 2006, a special meeting of the LPPG membership was held with JSA president Yonenaga and JSA senior managing director Kazuyoshi Nishimura, who was the director in charge of matters related to women's professionals, also in attendance in which the JSA asked the women's professionals to continue on as before and work within the current system.

The LPPG held its annual general meeting in June 2006, where it established a committee to examine the future of women's professional shogi within the JSA but would at the same time consider other options such as independence. The head of the committee was selected to be Akiko Takojima, and Fujimori, Nakai, Ichibashi and Rieko Yauchi were appointed as members.

On November 7, 2006, the LPPG leadership sent out a letter to all of its members announcing that a special meeting would be held in December to discuss the future of women's professional shogi. The members were requested to state whether they would be able to attend or would be represented by proxy, but no details were given about the meeting's itinerary and no meeting materials were sent with the letters. The LPPG committee met on both November 28 and 29 to further explain the situation, but once again no materials related to the meeting were released and requests to see the materials were denied. A notification about the upcoming meeting was posted on the official LPPG website staff blog on November 26, 2006.

On December 1, 2006, the LPPG held another special meeting where Fujimori put forth a motion regarding whether the association should seek corporate status as an independent organization, and the membership voted in favor of the motion and created a New Corporation Establishment Preparatory Committee (新法人設立準備委員会, Shinhōjin Setsuritsu Junbi Iinkai) (NCEPC) to begin examining the feasibility of forming their own organization. The committee was headed by Nakai and was tasked with developing a business plan which included revenue sources and sponsor negotiations, etc. (Note: The actual vote was 44 in favor (including 12 proxy votes), 1 against, and 8 abstentions (including 1 proxy vote).) A brief statement about the meeting was posted the by the public relations department of the JSA on the association's official website later that same day, which included a comment given by Japan Shogi Association senior managing director Nishimura stating that the JSA had been informed of the outcome of the meeting, would respond to it in good faith and would work with the LPPG and other concerned parties in comprehensively reviewing the situation. There was, however, some disagreement among women professional's over what exactly had been decided, with some saying that result was clearly a mandate in favor of breaking free of the JSA while others stating that the result was only to establish a preparatory committee to cautiously explore various options. This difference of opinion began to cause a split among the women's professionals.

In January 2007, the LPPG contacted the Japan Go Association to inquire about the possibility of using its head office as a site for holding official women's professional games if such games could no longer be held at the JSA offices if the LPPG became independent. A representative of the Go association stated that doing so should not be a problem since shogi boards and pieces could be easily stored and there should be no scheduling conflicts if games were played on days when the Go association did not itself have any official activities scheduled. On January 30, 2007, the members of the NCEPC visited the JSA headquarters to inform the association's board of directors of its intention to actively start seeking financial support for its activities and for a possible independent women's professional shogi players' association starting in February. The NCEPC stated that their goal was to try and raise 100 million Japanese yen in financial support and requested that the JSA grant them permission to do so. According to an April 2007 article published in the Nishinippon Shimbun, it was at this meeting that the JSA position on the matter of women's professional becoming independent changed and hardened in favor of trying to discourage it. The article stated that one of the reasons the JSA, in particular its president Yonenaga, had initially been in favor and even seemed to encourage women to become independent was because of financial concerns the association was facing at the time and the general cost of supporting women's professionals; however, when the JSA heard that the NCEPC wanted to raise JPY 100 million, they became concerned that this would impact the association's ability to raise funds for its own activities.

In February 2007, the JSA's board of directors met to discuss the current situation. The board felt that not much progress was being made and the disagreement among women's professionals over becoming independent had created a state of uncertainty that might impact its operations as well as its relationship with fans and sponsors. So, the board approved the sending letters to all 55 women's professionals requesting that they officially state whether they were in favor of remaining part of the JSA or becoming independent. The NCEPC felt that this represented a hardening of the JSA's position that placed unnecessary pressure on women's professionals and further exacerbated the differences in opinion on the matter. The board also reaffirmed its position that only those persons completely the apprentice school system would be eligible for full-membership, but also pointed out that women professional's could also attempt to obtain regular professional status through the special testing system established in June 2006 for promising amateur players no longer eligible to participate in the apprentice school system.

On March 16, 2007, the NCEPC held a meeting to update its progress and comment on its negotiations with the JSA. There were 27 women's professionals and 16 regular professionals in attendance as well as other concerned parties. The meeting discussed the letter the JSA had sent out to all women's professionals asking them to officially clarify whether they wanted to remain part of the association. A number of the attendees at this meeting, including Yoshiharu Habu stated that a "split among women's professionals would not be desirable." At the same this meeting was held, 13 women's professionals who were more in favor of remaining part of the JSA met at its headquarters to state their case. They expressed concerns about the way the NCEPC was going about its business as well as how much information it was making public. They stated this caused some women's professionals to lose trust in the NCEPC and asked that any attempts to become independent be dropped and that a new discussion be started on the matter. In response to these women's professionals, NCEPC chairperson Nakai stated that she was "sincerely was trying to avoid a splitting of women's professionals and would continue to persistently try and resolve things through discussion." She also asked the JSA to help create a situation in which productive negotiations could take place.

=== Relationship with the JSA post-split ===
==== Initial cooperation ====
On July 28, 2007, the LPSA held a party at the Keio Plaza Hotel in Nishi-Shinjuku to commemorate the association's founding. Roughly 350 persons (including business leaders, politicians, educators, sports and entertainment figures) attended the party. A number of JSA shogi professionals, Meijin titleholder Toshiyuki Moriuchi and 3-crown titleholder Yoshiharu Habu also were in attendance, with Habu making the opening toast. Congratulatory messages and flower bouquet were also received from the major Japanese newspapers Mainichi Shimbun, Nikkan Sports and Hochi Shimbun.

In November 2007, Ishibashi defeated the defending Women's Ōi Shimizu to become the first LPSA professional to win one of women's professional shogi's major titles. Ishibashi successfully defended her title the following year by defeating Shimizu (who this time was the challenger) once again to win the 19th Women's Ōi title match.

On January 25, 2008, the LPSA posted on its official website that three of its members (Nakai, Nakakura and Saori Shimai) had been invited by local government officials to participate in events related to the second game of the 34th Women's Meijin match scheduled to take place in Kurashiki. Kurashiki was hosting the game as part of its celebration of the 40th anniversary of the city's establishment. The LPSA stated that all three agreed to accept the invitation and response was sent to the event organizers indicating as much. The LPSA stated, however, the invitation was later rescinded because the JSA has pressured the organizers by stating that it would be undesireable given the current state of the relationship between the two organizations for JSA women's professionals and LPSA women's professionals to participate in any events outside of official tournament games.

In November 2009, the JSA posted on its official website that it reached an agreement with the LPSA regarding future cooperation. A joint statement signed by the JSA and LPSA presidents listed five points that the two organizations agreed upon, one of which was the establishment of a liaison committee made up of two members of the JSA, two members of the LPSA, one uninvolved third party observer and one secretary where issues between the two organizations could be discussed in good faith to try and stop them from becoming serious problems. The liaison council was initially set up to meet once per month.

==== Worsening relations and boycott ====
The LPSA announced in July 2012 that Mana Watanabe had satisfied its standards for becoming a women's professional 3-kyū and thus made Watanabe the first amateur to be awarded such status by the LPSA. The JSA, however, refused to recognize this saying that the LPSA had not consulted it on the matter and that the LPSA standards were too lax compared to those of the JSA. The JSA further stated that only those amateurs who achieved successful results in the JSA's training groups were eligible to be awarded women's professional status, and this option was available to Watanabe if she chose to pursue it.

The disagreement between the two continued into the end of 2012 and even spilled over into negotiations with the Mynavi Corporation over renewing its agreement to jointly sponsor the Mynavi Women's Open Tournament, one of the major titles of women's professional shogi, with the JSA and LPSA. The LPSA stated that Watanabe should be allowed to compete in the tournament as a professional while the JSA continued to refuse to recognize her as such; the Mynavi Corporation tried to stay out of the dispute and said that the matter of professional qualification was something that the JSA and LPSA needed to decide. The dispute reached its head on January 28, 2013, when the LPSA faxed major media outlets to announce that LPSA president Ishibashi would be boycotting her 6th Mynavi Open semi-final game against JSA women's professional Kana Satomi that was scheduled to be played two days later. The following day, Ishibashi and LPSA lawyers held a press conference explaining the reasons for the boycott and also accused the JSA and Mynavi of a serious breach of the tournaments sponsorship agreement that infringed upon the ability of the LPSA to operate autonomously. Ishibashi further criticized the JSA for continuously taking steps to undermine the LPSA to the extent that the LPSA felt it had no option other than to boycott the game. She stated that the JSA stance was the same for all women's tournaments and if things remained unchanged that the LPSA would consider boycotting other tournaments as well. The JSA refused to change its position, and Ishibashi did not show up for her game against Satomi. On January 30, the LPSA announced that it had decided to cancel its contact with Mynavi Corporation and would no longer be cosponsoring the tournament.

Relations between the two organizations continued to worsen for the next several months. In June 2013, however, the LPSA posted an apology to Mynavi on its official website expressing regret over what had happened, and the JSA responded favorably to the LPSA's apology and announced on July 12, 2013, that it was recognizing Watanabe's status as a women's professional 3-kyū (as of July 1, 2013) and would seek to mend its relationship with the LPSA. The situation worsened again in August, however, when the apology to Mynavi Corporation was removed from the LPSA's website and Ishibashi once again criticized not only the JSA but also Mynavi in an essay she wrote for the Japanese weekly magazine Shukan Shinchō as part of a special section on the experiences of various Japanese women in dealing with the notion of Yamato nadeshiko. The LPSA's action and Ishibashi's article further hardened the JSA position, and it posted on its official website in October 2013 that it decided to formally end all contact with the LPSA and would also not enter any future contracts or negotiations with the organization.

On January 24, 2014, former-representative director Nakai announced that she had left the LPSA and would now compete as an unaffiliated women's professional. Nakai stated that her decision was due to a strong sense of responsibility she felt for the LPSA's problems with the JSA and the inconvenience it had caused various sponsors as well as disagreements she had with some other LPSA directors on the boycott and other related matters. A few days later on January 28, 2014, Ishibashi announced that she intended to retire from women's professional shogi at the end of the month as well as intended to leave the LSPA when her term as representative director ended at the end of February 2014.

==== Reconciliation ====
On June 2, 2014, the JSA and LPSA both announced on their official websites that they had been discussing ways to improve their relationship and resolve any outstanding issues that still existed between the two. These discussions led to the signing of a "Statement of Mutual Agreement" in which both associations agreed to work together to further promote women's professional shogi and to ensure the smooth operation of women's major title matches.

The LPSA celebrated its 10th anniversary in May 2017. JSA president Yasumitsu Satō and Lifetime Meijin Toshiyuki Moriuchi gave celebratory speeches at an anniversary party held in Tokyo on May 21, and they were joined in attendance by a number of other JSA shogi professionals and women's shogi professionals in attendance. A video presentation shown during the party featured congratulatory messages from various JSA shogi professionals (including the reigning Meijin Amahiko Satō) as well as other LPSA supporters.

In May 2018, JSA president Satō as well as over 20 JSA regular professionals and about 40 JSA women's professionals also attended a retirement party for the first women's professional and founding member of the LPSA Takojima. At the party, President Satō not only gave a speech honoring Takojima and her accomplishments, but also acknowledging the LPSA and activities by saying that "although the JSA and LPSA are different organizations, their goals should be the same" and asking the LPSA for its "continued support in the development of shogi".

=== 15th Anniversary ===
The LPSA celebrated its 15th anniversary in 2022. In a December 2022 article in the Chunichi Shimbun, representative director Nakakura stated that "business operations had finally stabilized and that she wanted the LPSA to continue working on changing shogi's image as being a game for only males to play". She also commented that even though the number of LPSA members has not changed in 15 years, the association has been able to increase its promotional activities, particularly outside of major metropolitan areas, by constantly trying new ideas and sponsoring various regional events.

== Logo ==
The LPSA's official logo was unveiled at a press conference held May 30, 2007. The logo was designed by Japanese sculptor Jun Nishimura. The logo consists of a yellow circle and three smaller green ovals moving in an upward direction away from the yellow circle. The yellow circle is intended to represent a Japanese sunflower because sunflowers always seem to try and tilt to face the sun, and the three green ovals are intended to represent the kanji characters 和, 話 and 輪. All three characters can be read as "wa" and the three "wa" together are intended to represent "harmony", "communication" and "teamwork". The smaller green ovals get larger the further they are from the yellow circle and this represents the hope that the association will continue to reach upwards and develop over time.
