= Daishi Line =

Daishi Line (大師線, Daishi-sen) refers to two Japanese railway lines:

- Keikyū Daishi Line in Kawasaki-ku, Kawasaki, Kanagawa Prefecture
- Tobu Daishi Line in Adachi, Tokyo
