= Tobu Railway =

Japanese railway company

Tobu Railway Co., Ltd.
- Native name: 東武鉄道株式会社
- Romanized name: Tōbu Tetsudō kabushiki gaisha
- Type: Public KK
- Traded as: TYO: 9001; Nikkei 225 component
- Industry: Rail-focused conglomerate
- Founded: 1 November 1897; 128 years ago
- Headquarters: Tobu-kan, 18-12 Oshiage 2-chome, Sumida-ku, Tokyo (Registered in Tokyo Skytree East Tower, 1-2 Oshiage 1-chome, Sumida-ku, Tokyo), Japan
- Area served: Tokyo, Saitama, Chiba, Gunma, Tochigi
- Key people: Nezu Kaichirō (former Representative Director); Yoshizomi Nezu(Chairman); Yutaka Tsuzuki (President) (Representative Director)
- Services: Passenger railway
- Total assets: ¥1.3 trillion
- Owner: Investment trusts (JTSB 6.13%, TMTBJ 4.19%); Fukoku Life (2.47%); SSBTC Treaty 505234 (2.26%); Mizuho Bank (2.20%)
- Number of employees: 3,470 (As of March 2022)
- Subsidiaries: Various, including the operating company of Tokyo Skytree, Tobu Bus, Asahi Motor
- Website: www.tobu.co.jp

Old Tobu Railway logo used until July 2011

Tobu Railway Company, Ltd. (東武鉄道株式会社, Tōbu Tetsudō kabushiki gaisha) is a Japanese commuter railway and keiretsu holding company in the Greater Tokyo Area as well as an intercity and regional operator in the Kantō region. Excluding the Japan Railways Group companies, Tobu's 463.3 km (287.9 mi) rail system is the second longest in Japan after Kintetsu. It serves large portions of Saitama Prefecture, Gunma Prefecture and Tochigi Prefecture, as well as northern Tokyo and western Chiba Prefecture. Tobu Railway Company is listed in the First Section of the Tokyo Stock Exchange and is a constituent of the Nikkei 225 index.

The Tobu corporate group is also engaged in road transportation (bus/taxi), real estate, and retail. It is the owner of the Tokyo Skytree, the third tallest tower in the world. The company is a member of the Fuyo Group keiretsu.

The name "Tobu" is formed from the kanji for east (東) and Musashi (武蔵), the initial area served.

== History ==
Tobu is one of the oldest railway companies in Japan. It was established in November 1897 and began operation between Kita-Senju and Kuki in August 1899. The Tojo Railway was founded in 1911 as a separate company, but shared its president and head office with Tobu.

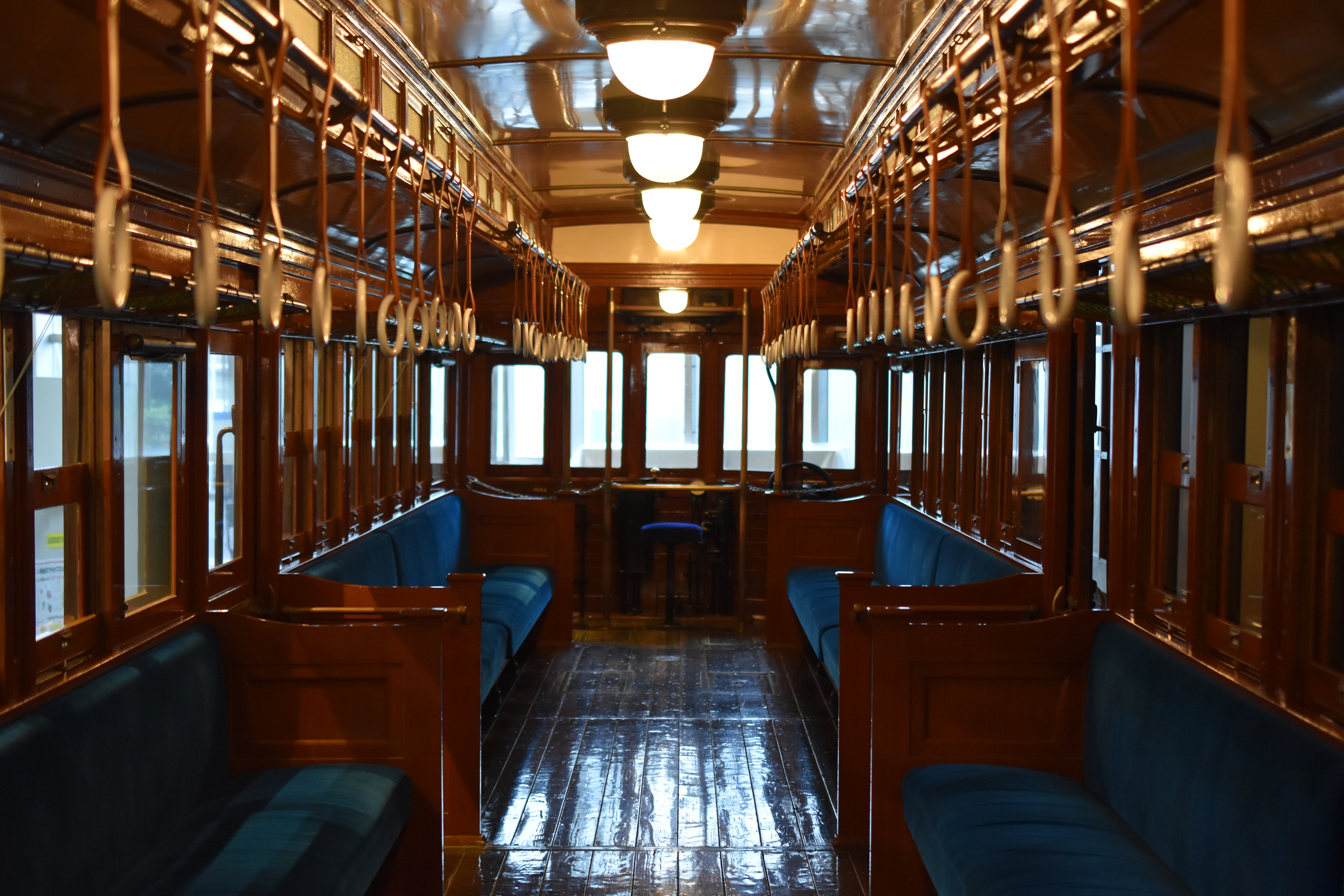
Inside the DeHa 1 Class No. 5, the first electric train of Tobu Railway

In 1905, Nezu Kaichirō became the president of Tobu Railway and successfully helped to grow the company to one of the largest private rail operators in the Kanto region.

In 1924, Tobu began operating its first electric train on the Isesaki Line between Asakusa (later Narihirabashi, today Tokyo Skytree Station) and Nishiarai.

Tobu was the first railway in the Kanto region to adopt quadruple tracks, on the Kita-Senju to Takenotsuka sector in 1974. Tobu Zoo, a combination of a zoo and an amusement park, opened in 1981.

== Railway network ==
Diagram of the Tobu network, showing main lines to right and Tojo Lines to lower left

Tobu has two isolated networks which are connected by the Chichibu Railway for ferrying of its rolling stock.

The Tobu Main Line network has a tree topology starting at Asakusa in Tokyo, with the Isesaki Line as the trunk, and the Tobu Kameido Line, Daishi Line, Tobu Urban Park Line, Tobu Sano Line, Koizumi Line, Tōbu Kiryū Line, and Nikkō Line forming the branches, with further branches into the Tobu Utsunomiya Line and Tobu Kinugawa Lines. It offers surcharged, seat-reserved limited express services from Tokyo to Nikkō and Kinugawa.

The Tojo Line runs northwest from Ikebukuro in Tokyo to central and western Saitama Prefecture. A branch, the Ogose Line, runs to Ogose from Sakado.

Tobu's terminals in Tokyo are at Asakusa (Main Line express services), Oshiage (most other Main Line services) and Ikebukuro (Tojo Line). The Skytree and Isesaki Lines interoperate with the Tokyo Metro Hibiya Line, Tokyo Metro Hanzomon Line and the Tokyu Den-en-toshi Line to serve central, southwestern Tokyo and Kanagawa Prefecture, while the Tojo Line interoperates with the Tokyo Metro Fukutoshin Line, Tokyo Metro Yurakucho Line, Tokyu Toyoko Line and Minatomirai Line to serve central and southwest Tokyo and Kanagawa Prefecture.

=== Main lines ===
Name	Symbol	Stations	Length
Tobu Skytree Line		Asakusa – Tōbu-Dōbutsu-Kōen	41.0 km (25.5 mi)
Kameido Line		Kameido – Hikifune	3.4 km (2.1 mi)
Daishi Line		Nishiarai – Daishimae	1.0 km (0.62 mi)
Isesaki Line		Tōbu-Dōbutsu-Kōen – Isesaki	73.5 km (45.7 mi)
Sano Line		Tatebayashi – Kuzū	22.1 km (13.7 mi)
Koizumi Line		Tatebayashi – Nishi-Koizumi, Ōta – Higashi-Koizumi	12.0 km (7.5 mi)
Kiryū Line		Ōta – Akagi	20.3 km (12.6 mi)
Nikkō Line		Tōbu-Dōbutsu-Kōen – Tōbu Nikkō	94.5 km (58.7 mi)
Utsunomiya Line		Shin-Tochigi – Tōbu Utsunomiya	24.3 km (15.1 mi)
Kinugawa Line		Shimo-Imaichi – Shin-Fujiwara	16.2 km (10.1 mi)
Tobu Urban Park Line (Noda Line)		Ōmiya – Kasukabe – Funabashi	62.7 km (39.0 mi)

=== Tobu Tojo lines ===
Name	Symbol	Stations	Length
Tojo Line		Ikebukuro – Yorii	75.0 km (46.6 mi)
Ogose Line		Sakado – Ogose	10.9 km (6.8 mi)

== Rolling stock ==
As of 1 April 2016, Tobu Railway operates a fleet of 1,890 electric multiple unit (EMU) vehicles, the third largest fleet for a private railway operator in Japan after Tokyo Metro (2,728 vehicles) and Kintetsu (1,905).

=== Express EMUs ===
- 300/350 series EMU (introduced 1991, 300 series variant operated until 2017)
- 200/250 series EMU Ryōmō (introduced 1991)
- 100 series EMU Spacia (introduced 1990)
- 634 series EMU Skytree Train (introduced 2012)
- 500 series 3-car EMUs (introduced in 21 April 2017)
- N100 series EMU Spacia X (introduced 15 July 2023)

Eight new three-car 500 series EMU trains were introduced on limited express services on lines from Asakusa on 21 April 2017.

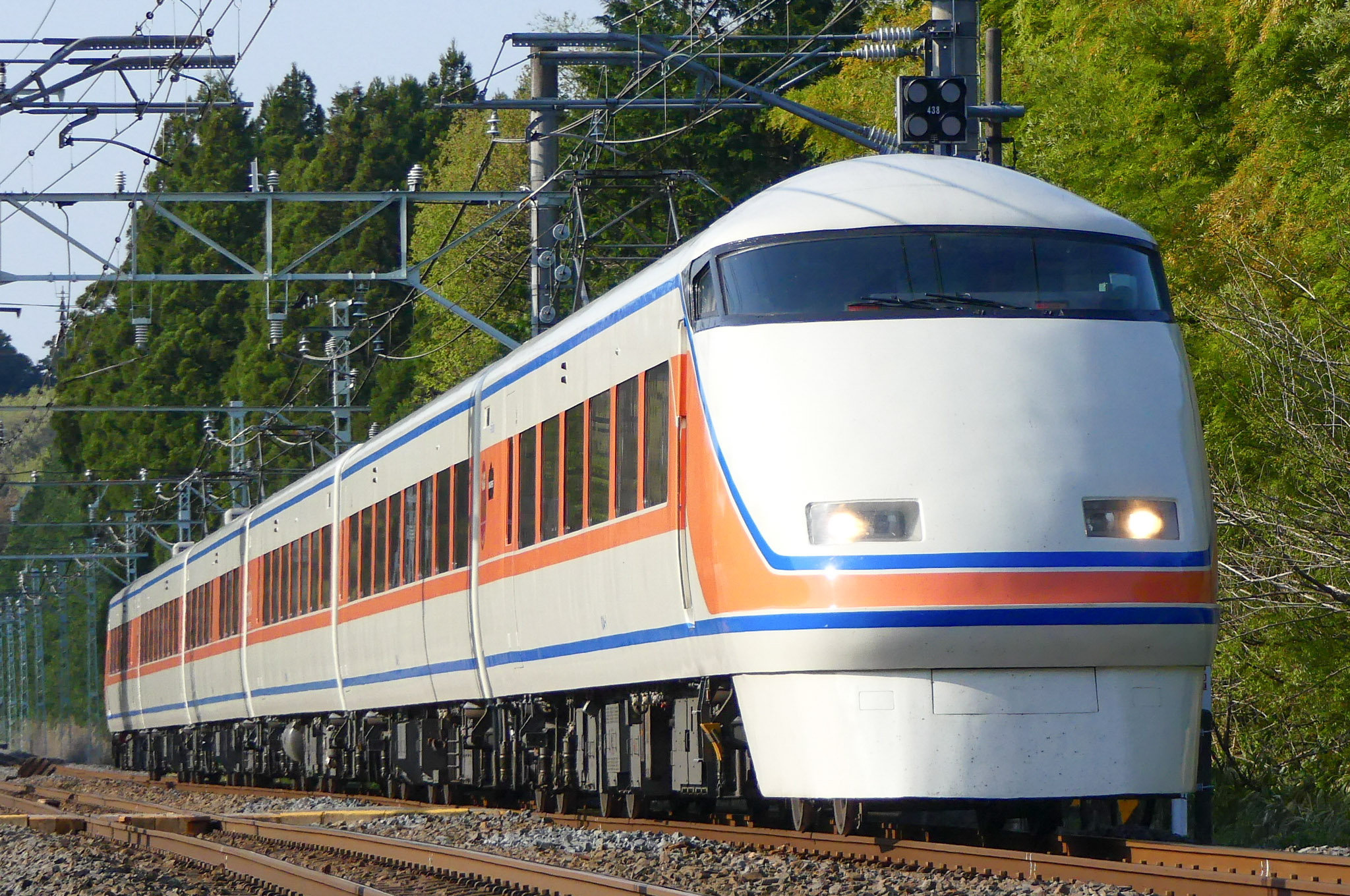
100 series

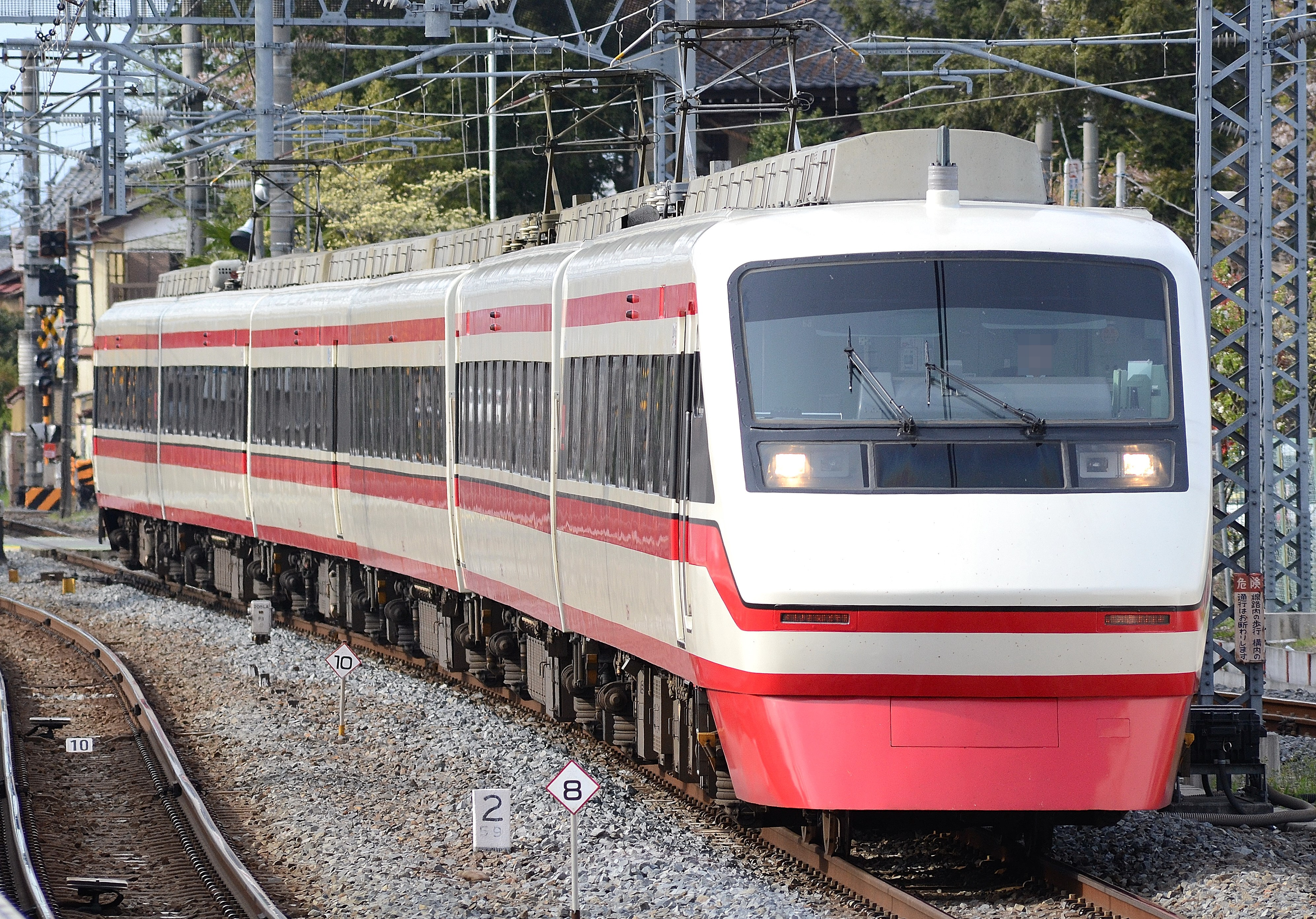
200 series

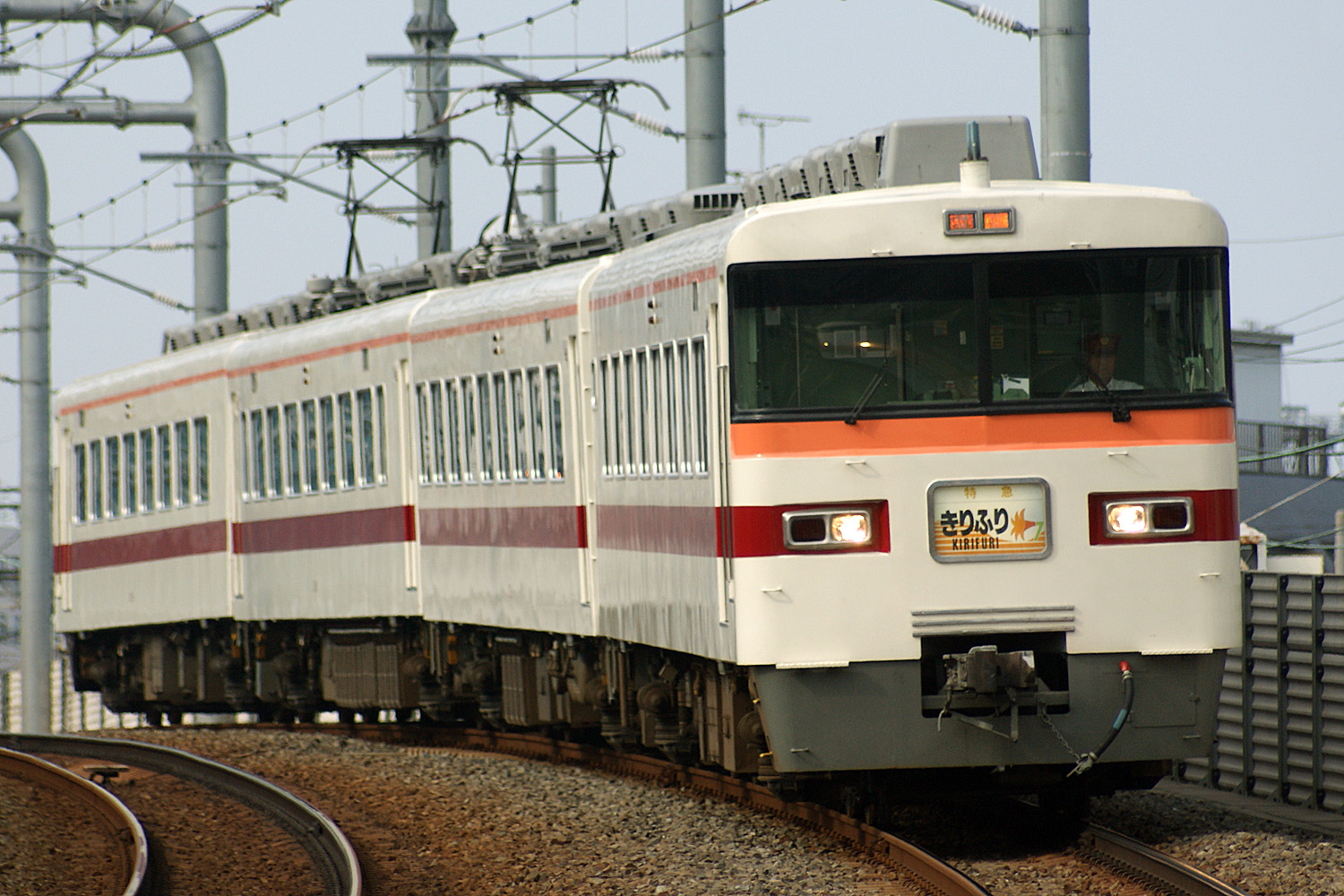
350 series Kirifuri limited express

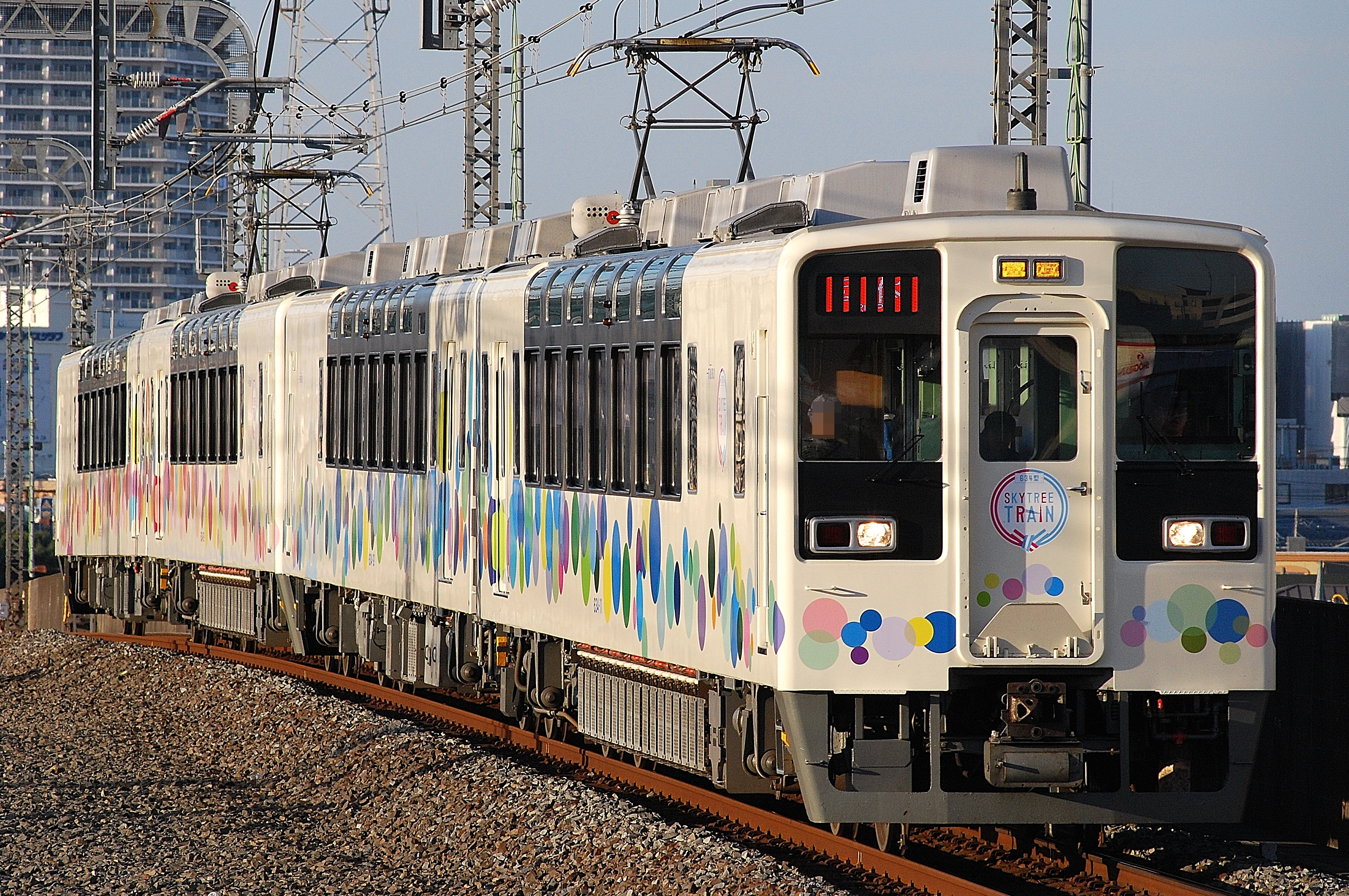
634 series Skytree Train

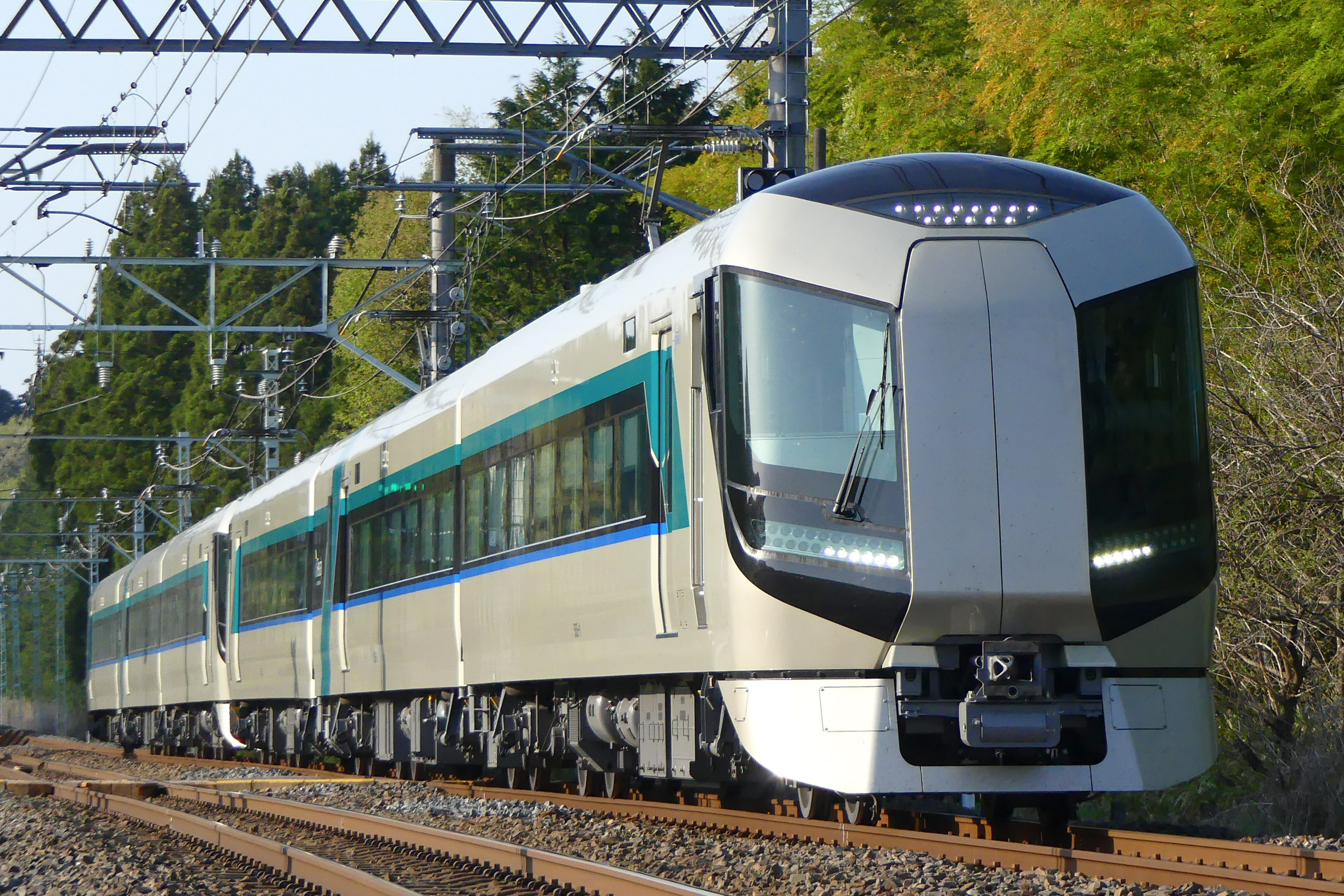
A 500 series EMU in April 2017

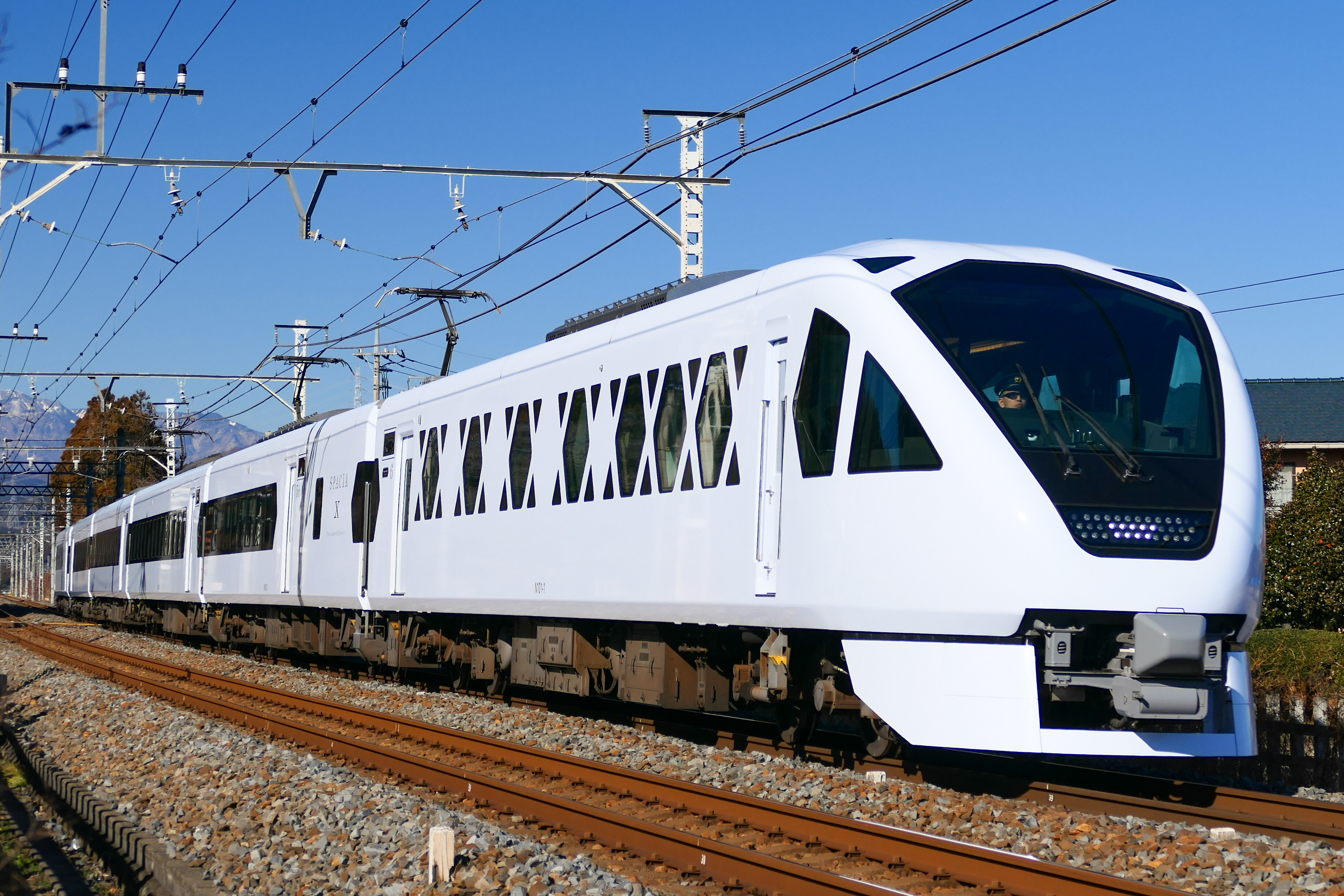
N100 series Spacia X

=== Commuter EMUs ===
- 8000 series EMU (introduced 1963)
- 800/850 series EMU
- 9000 series EMU (introduced 1981)
- 10000 series EMU (introduced 1983)
- 20000 series EMU (introduced 1988)
- 30000 series EMU (introduced 1996)
- 50000 series EMU (introduced 2005)
- 60000 series EMU (introduced June 2013)
- 70000 series EMU (since 7 July 2017)
- 80000 series EMU (since 8 March 2025)
- 90000 series (Future)
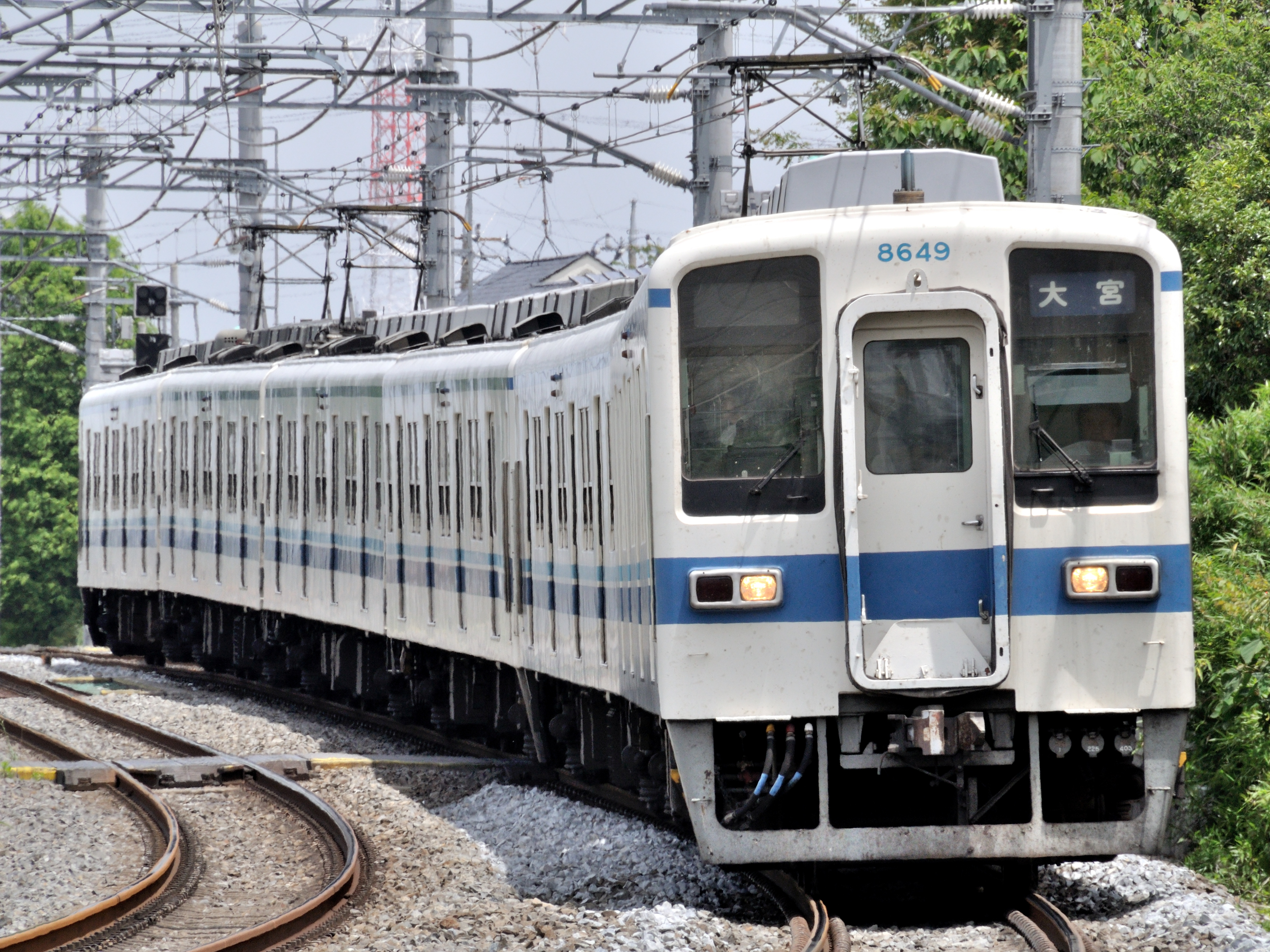
8000 series

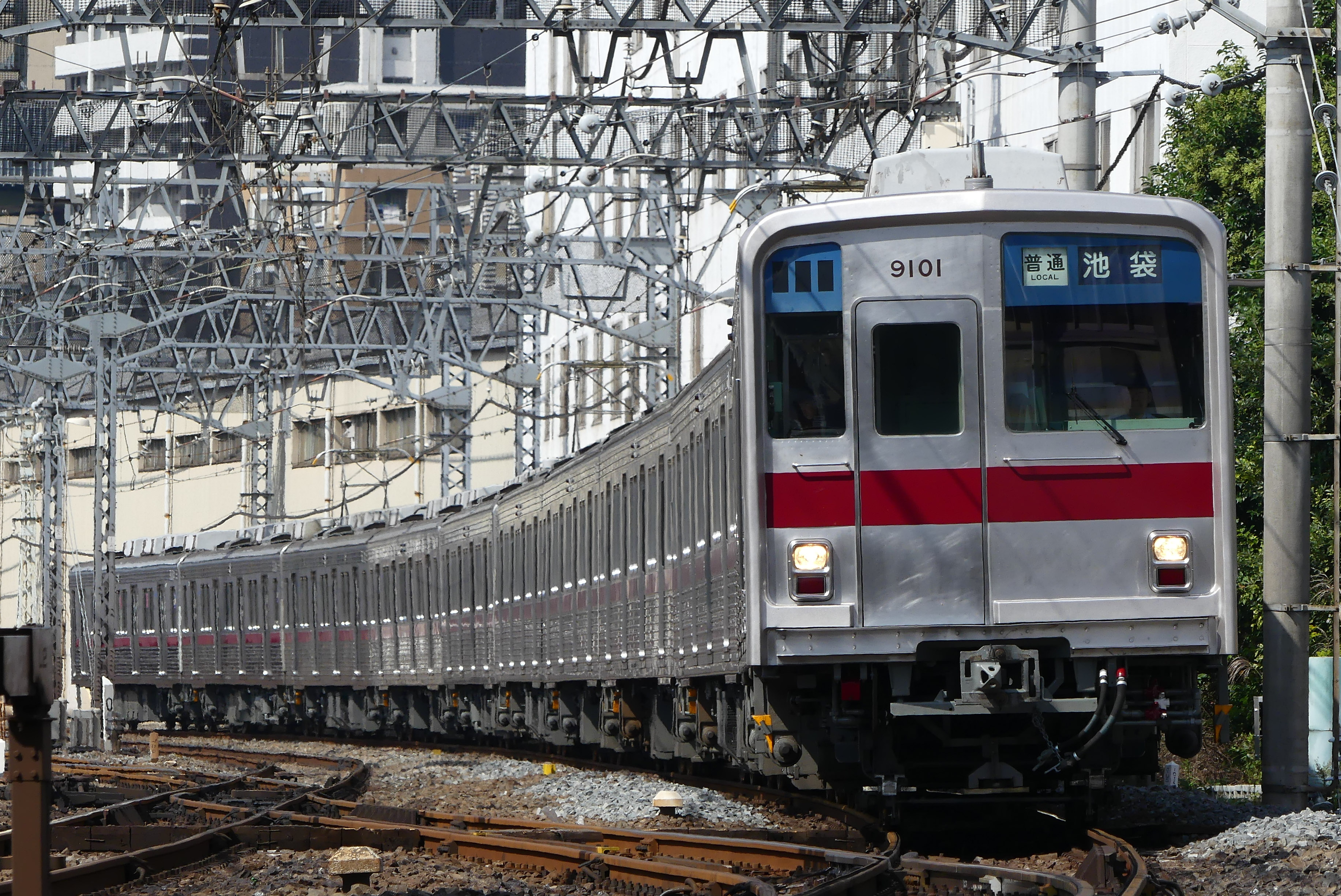
9000 series

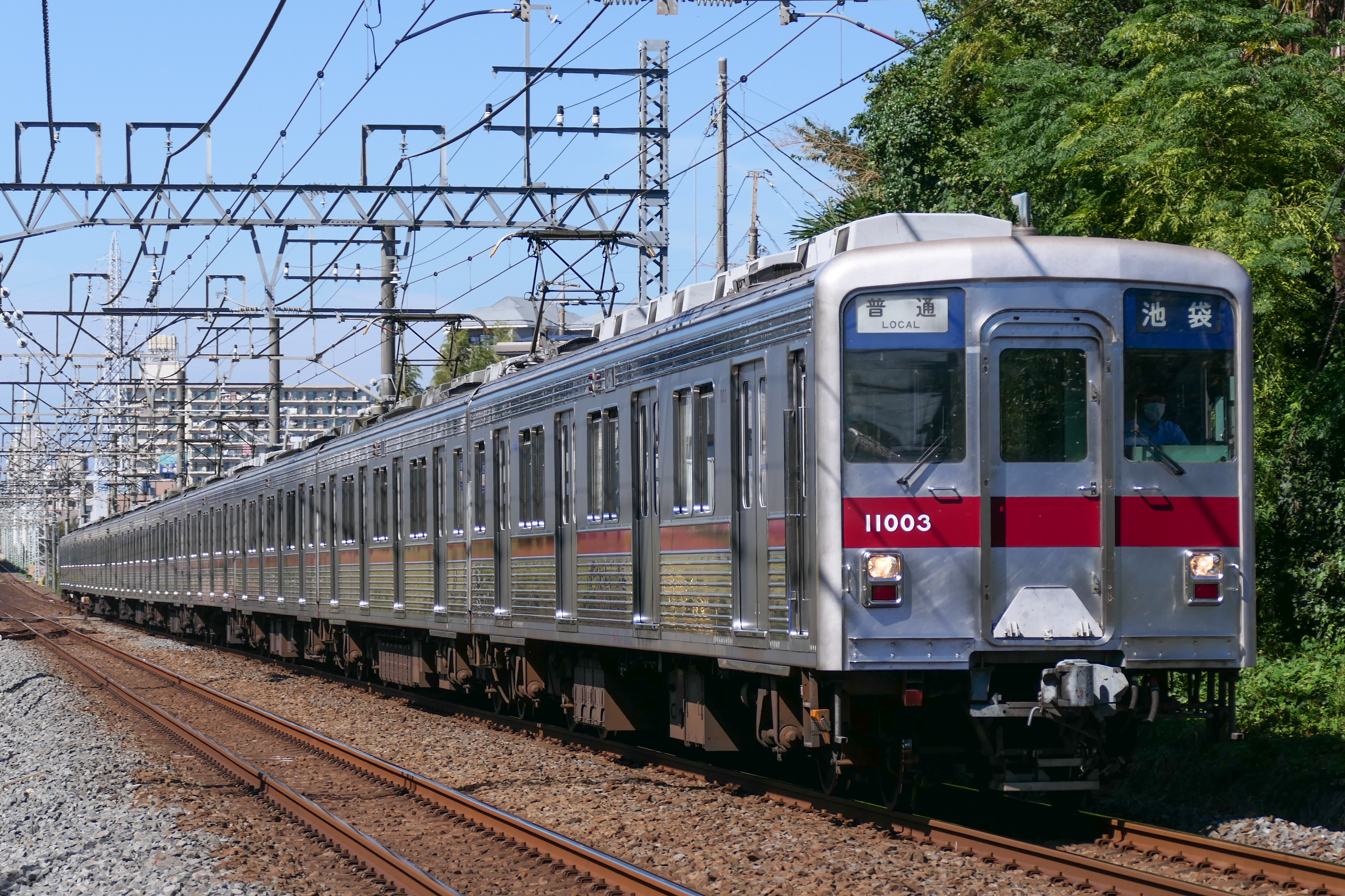
10000 series

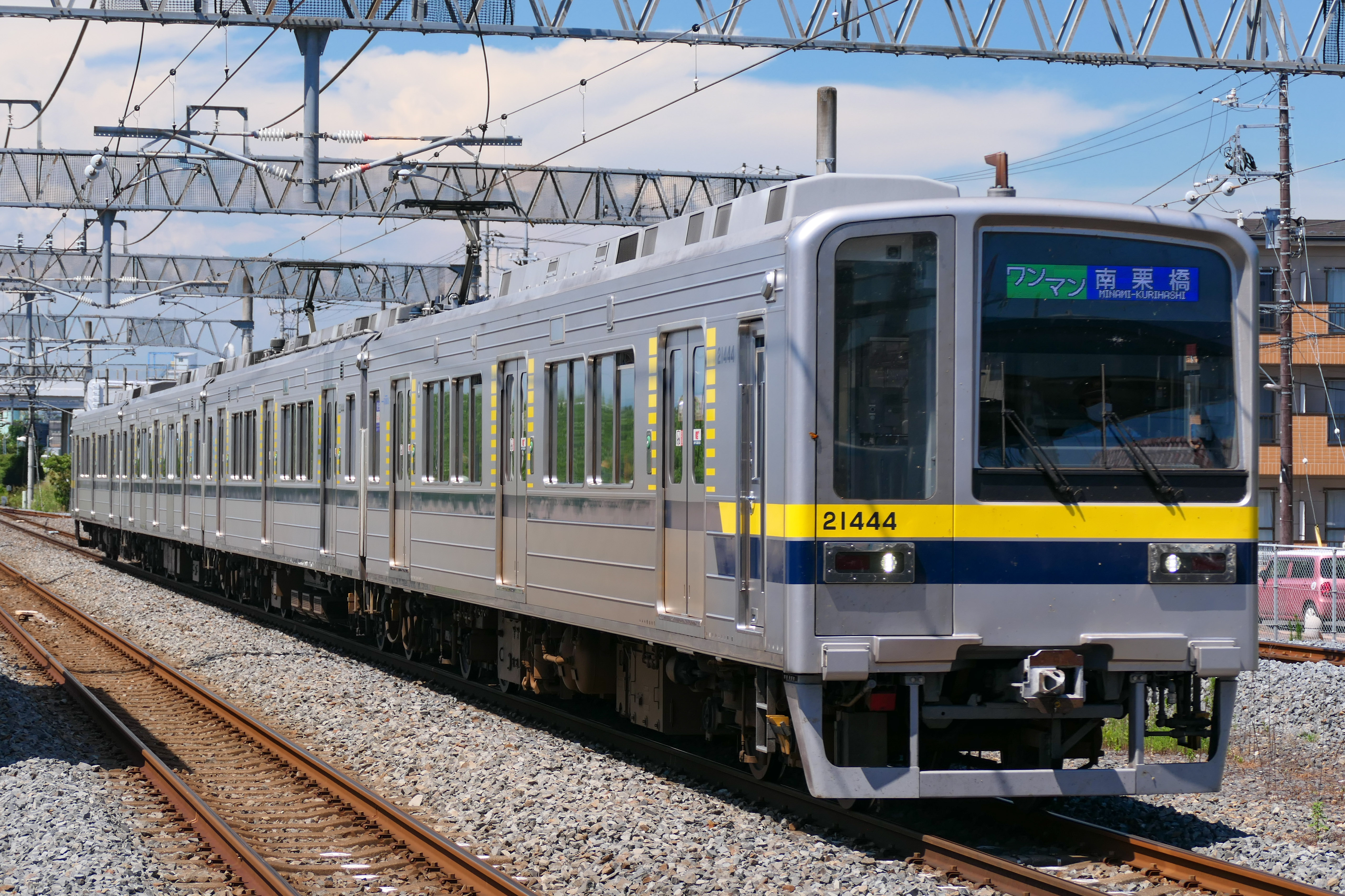
20000 series

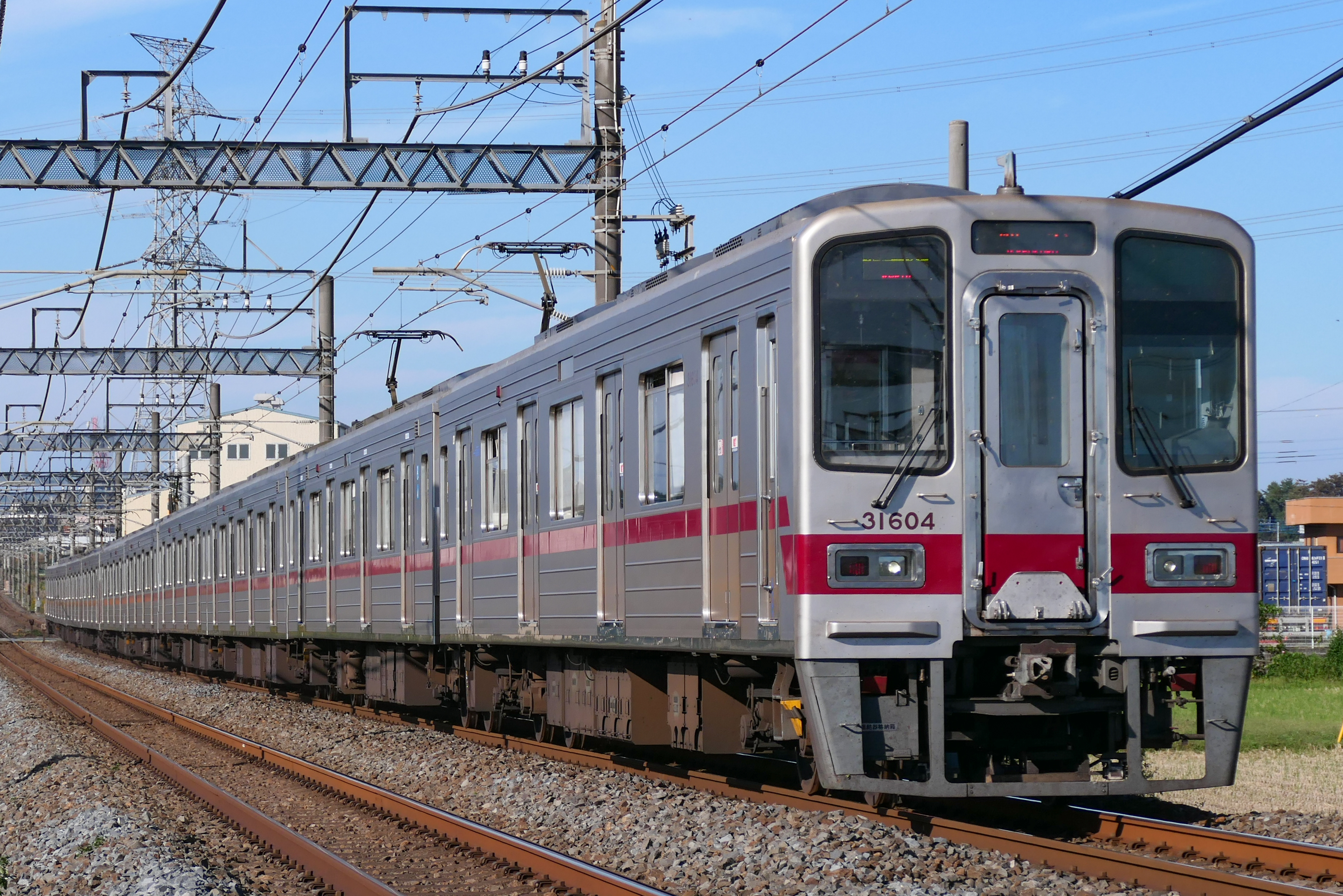
30000 series

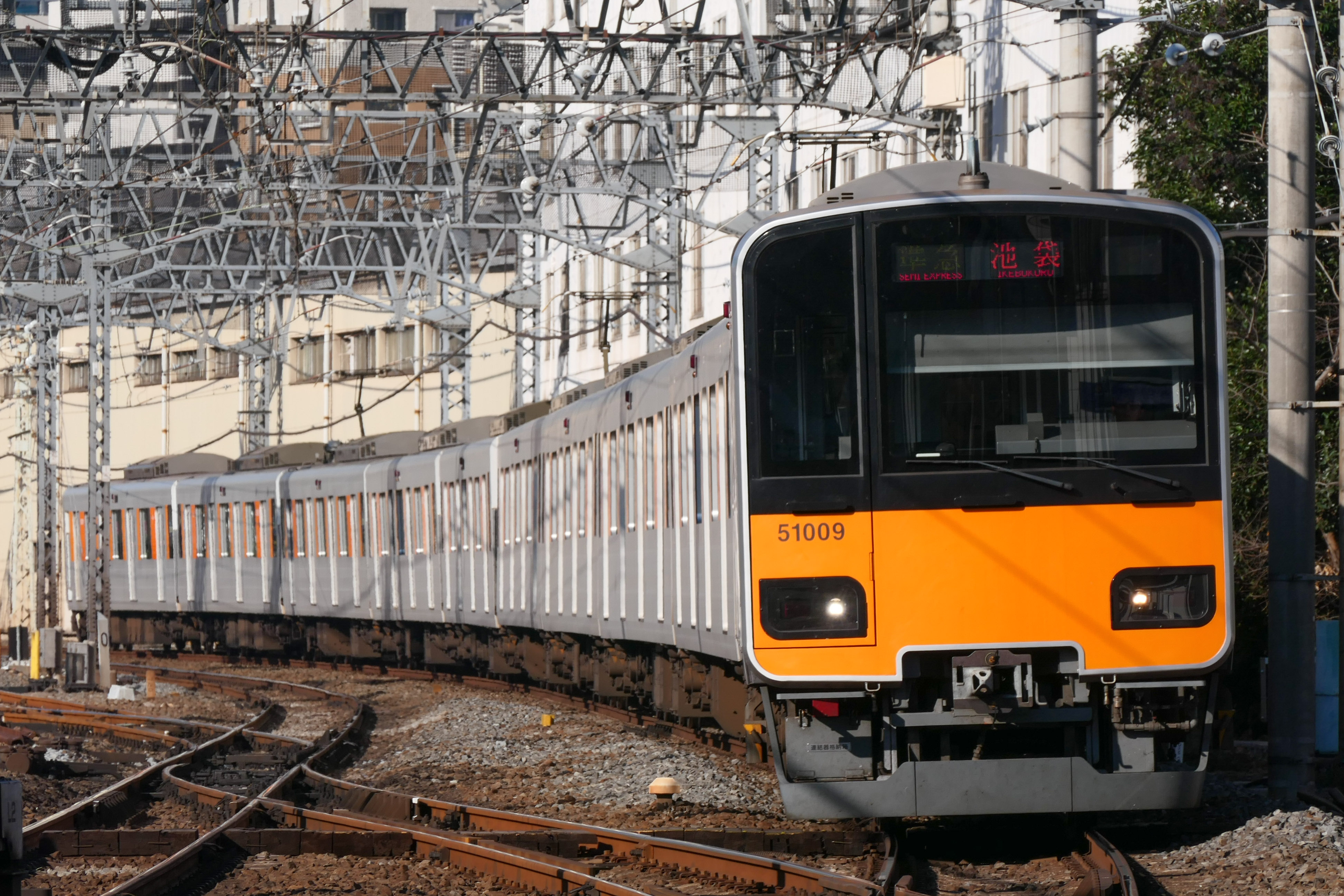
50000 series

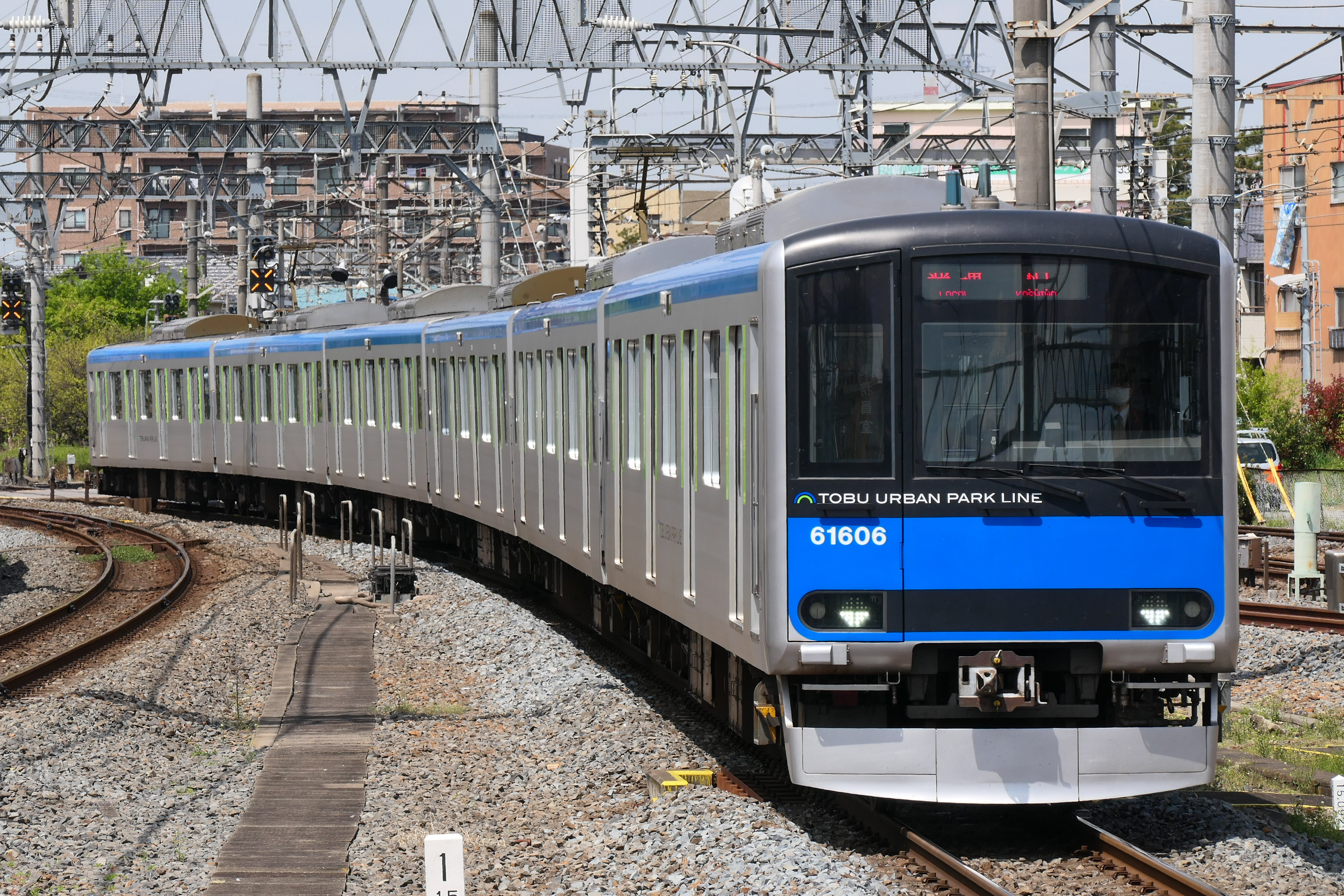
60000 series

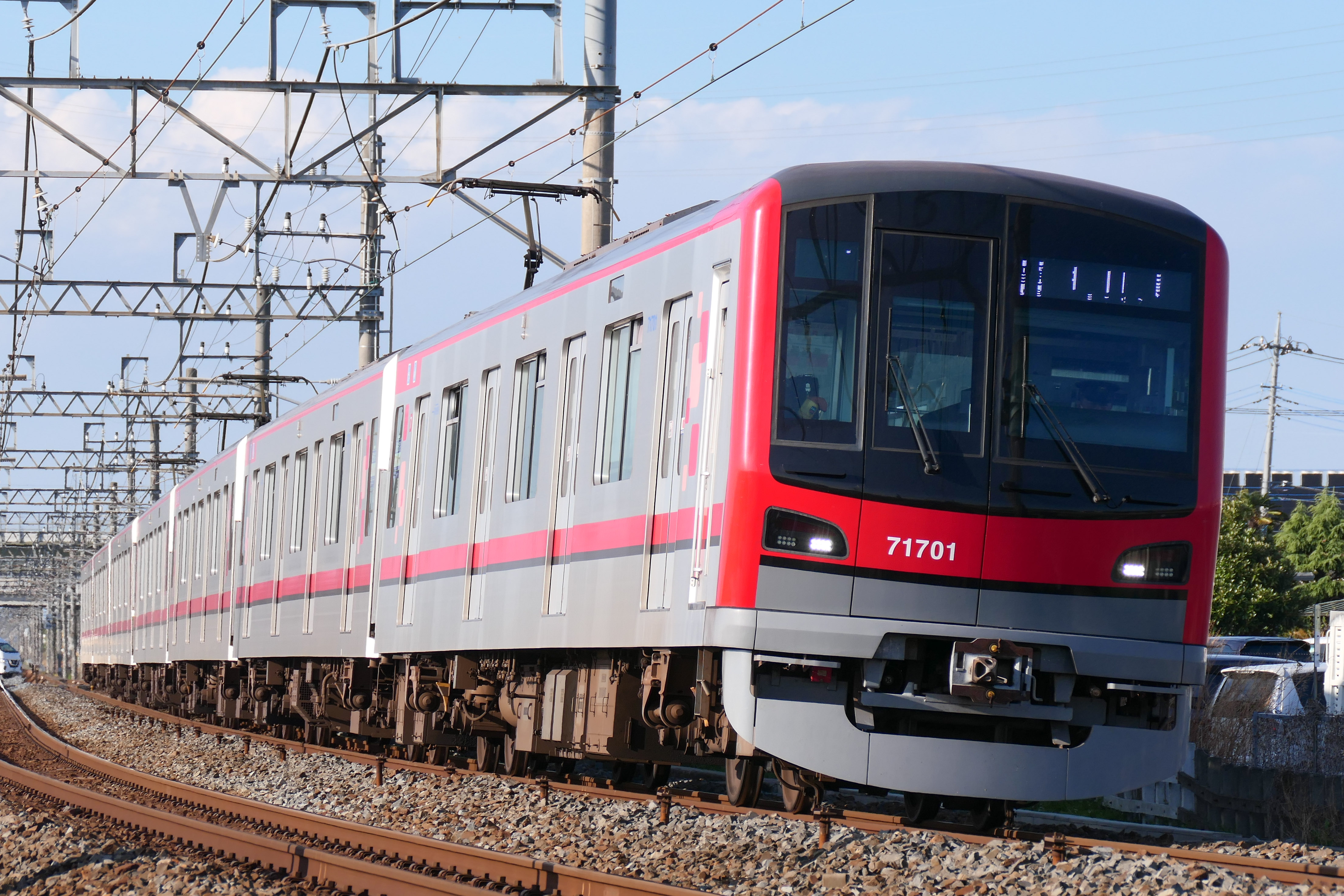
70000 series

=== Steam locomotive ===
Tobu operates steam-hauled tourist services on the Kinugawa Line since 10 August 2017 using JNR Class C11 steam locomotive C11 207 loaned from JR Hokkaido together with JNR Class DE10 diesel locomotive DE10 1099 purchased from JR East, a fleet of six 12 and 14 series coaches purchased from JR Shikoku, and two Yo 8000 brake vans purchased from JR Freight and JR East. Since 2022, it also operates C11 325 that was acquired from the Mooka Line and C11 123 which was restored entirely by the railway.

=== Withdrawn types ===
==== Express EMUs ====
- 1700/1720 series
- 1800 series
- 5700 series
- 6000 series
- 6050 series
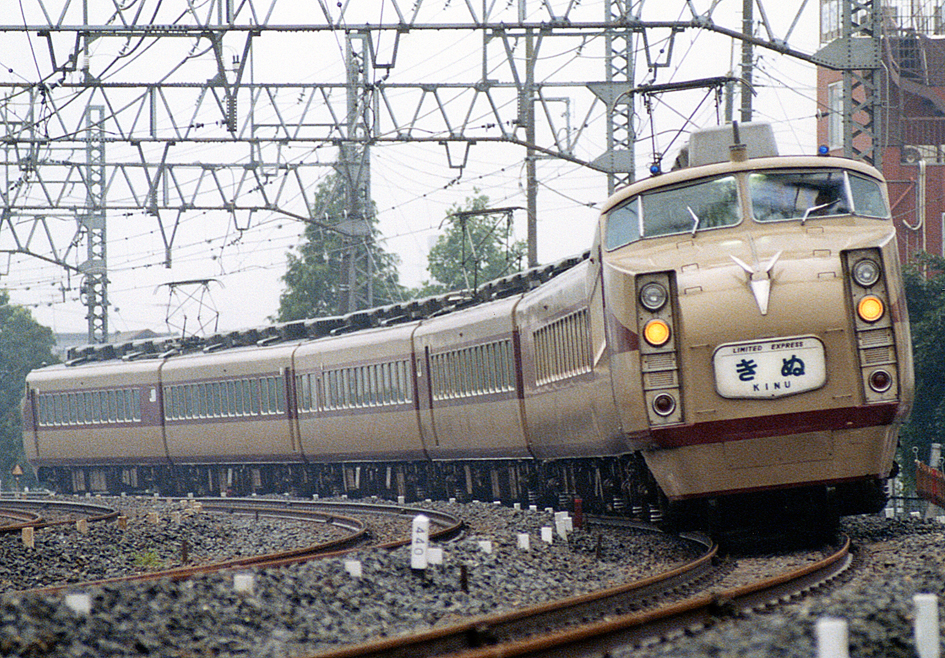
1720 series

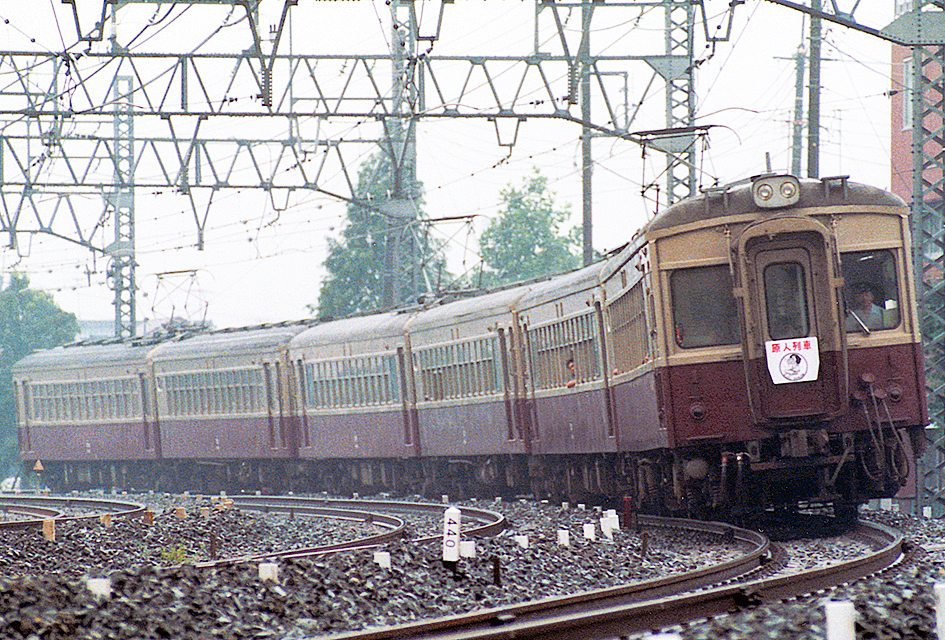
5700 series

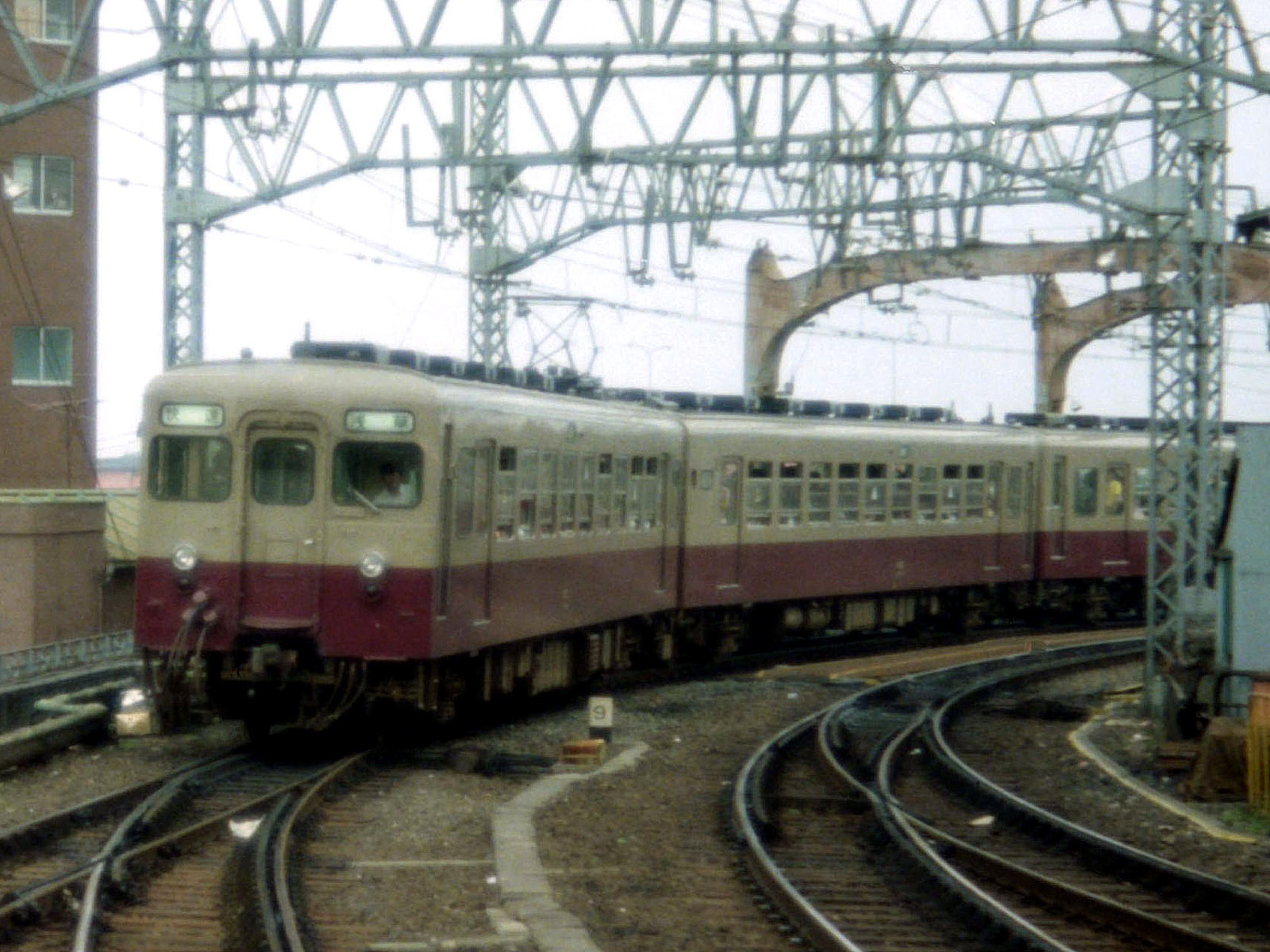
6000 series

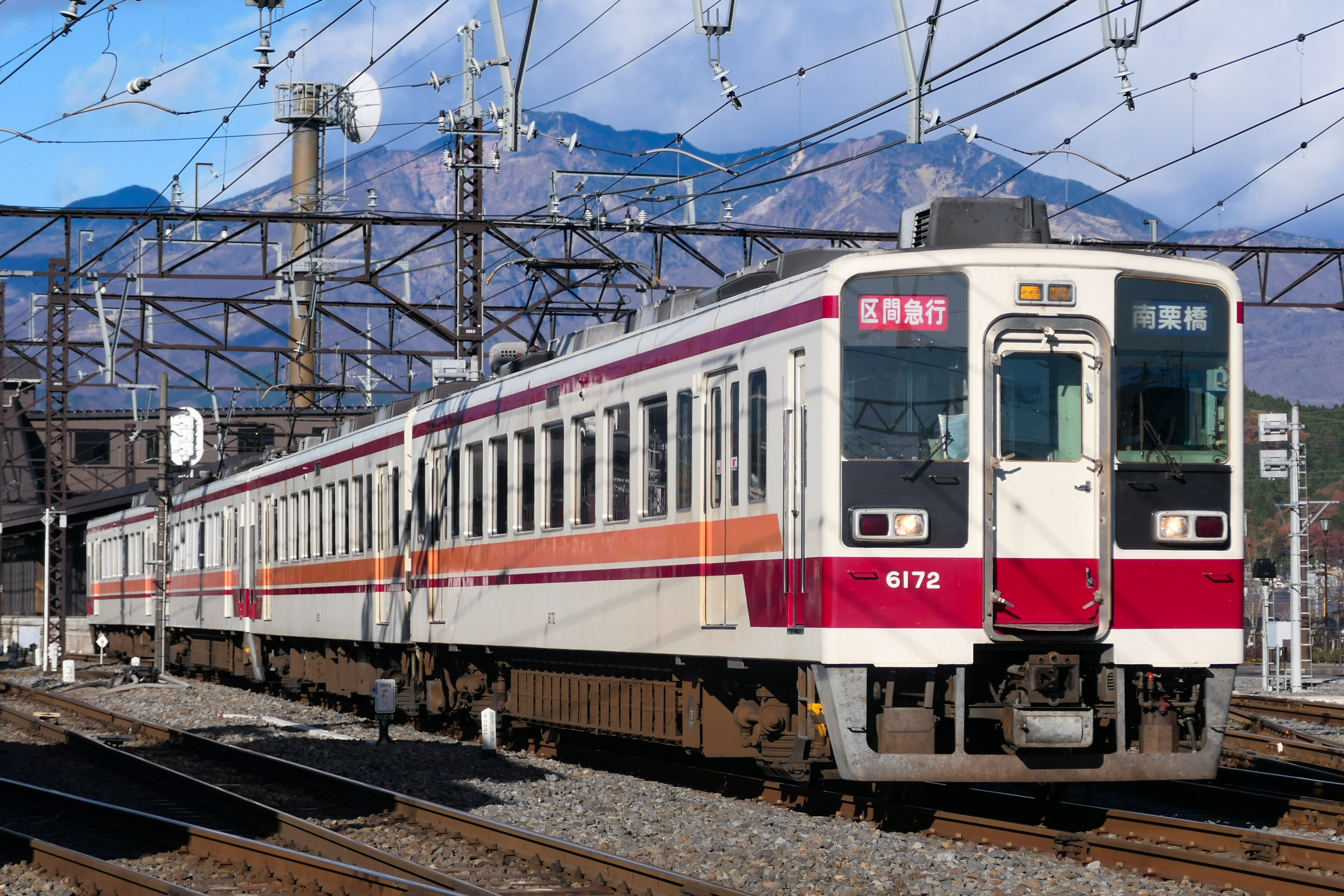
6050 series

==== Commuter EMUs ====
- 2000 series
- 3000 series
- 5000 series (1979–2006)
- 7300 series
- 7800 series
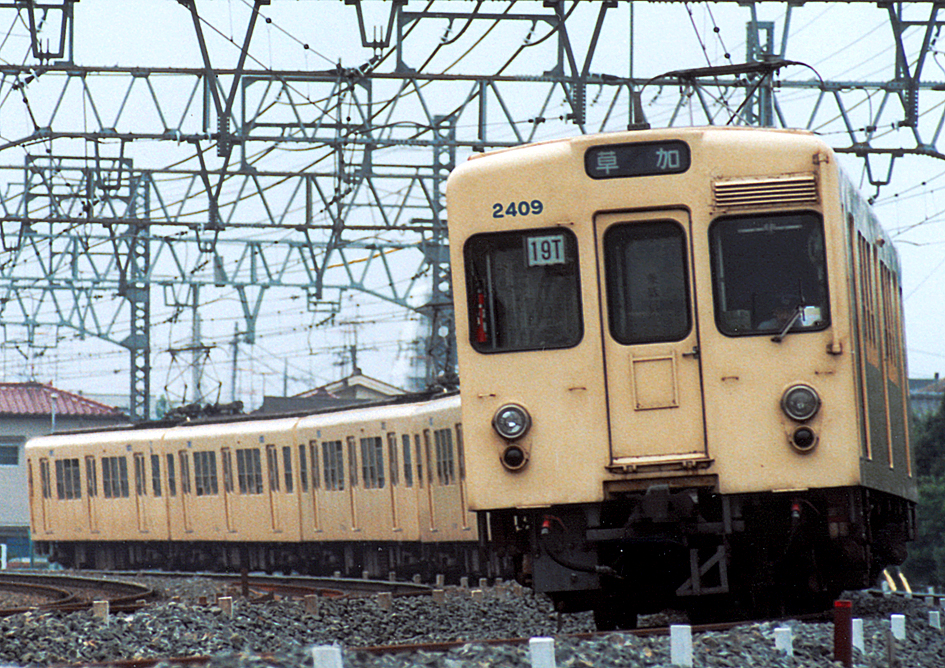
2000 series

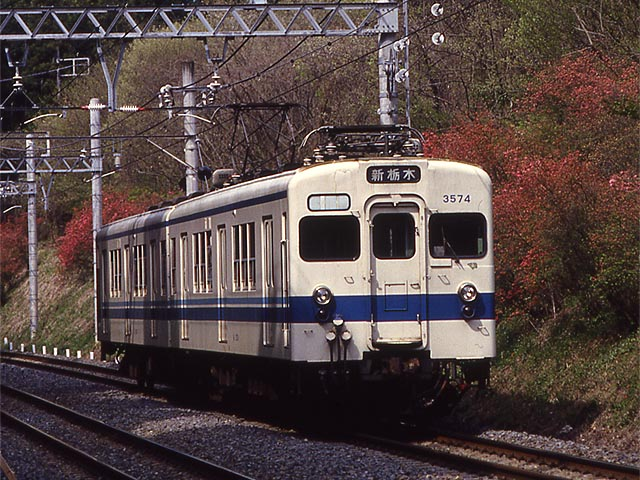
3000 series

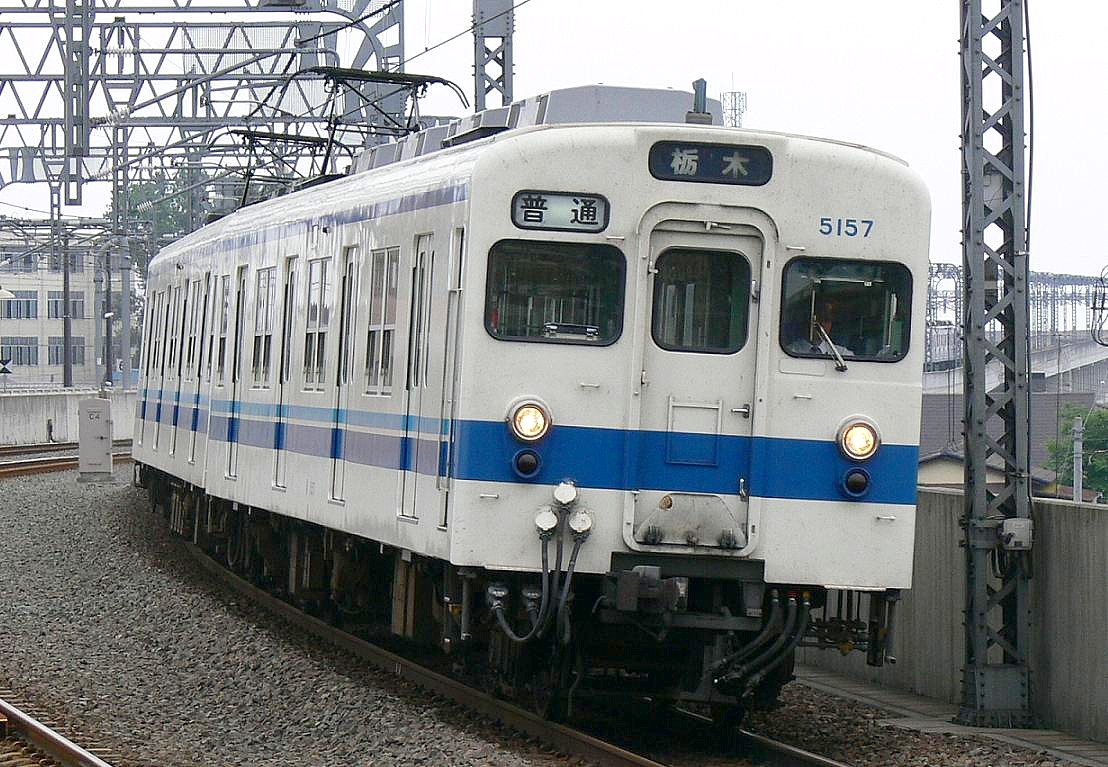
5000 series

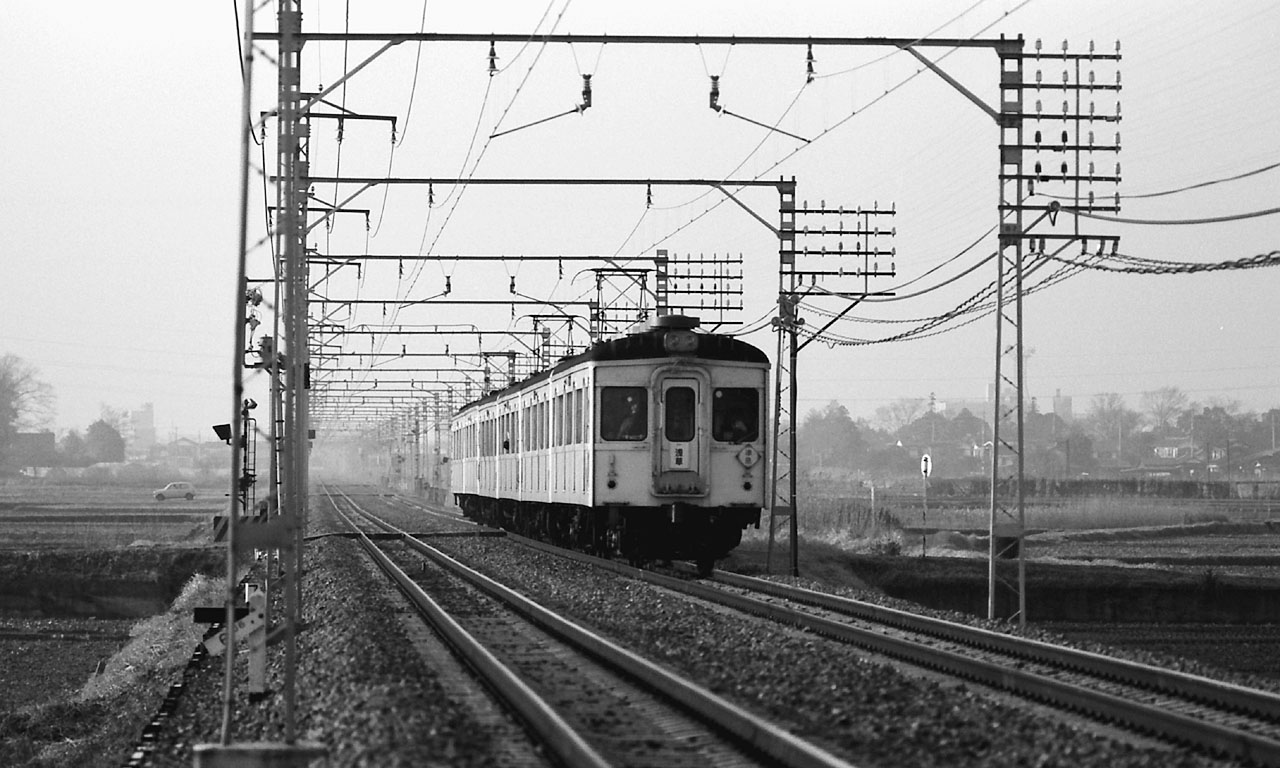
7300 series

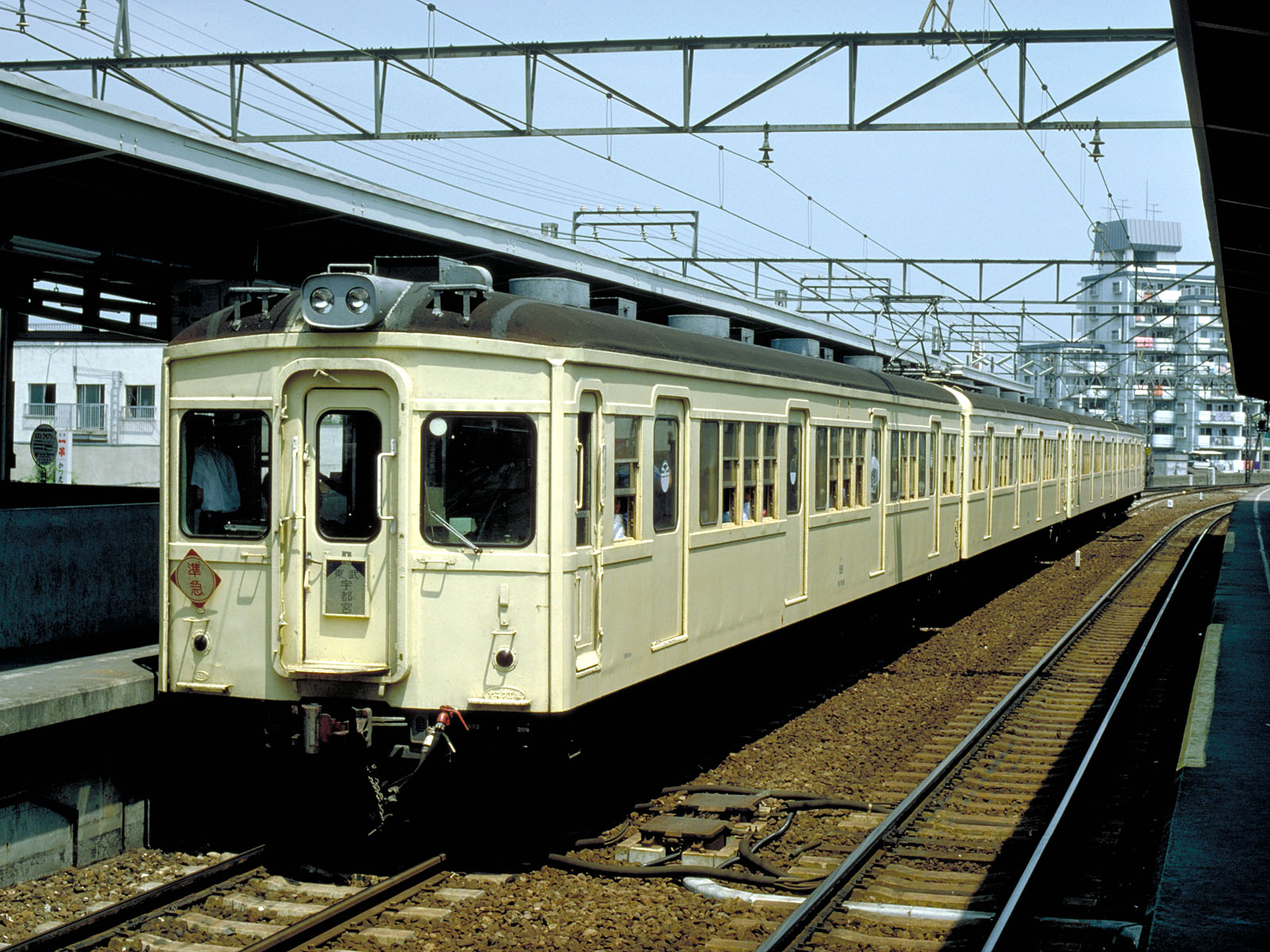
7800 series

==== DMUs ====
- KiHa 2000 series
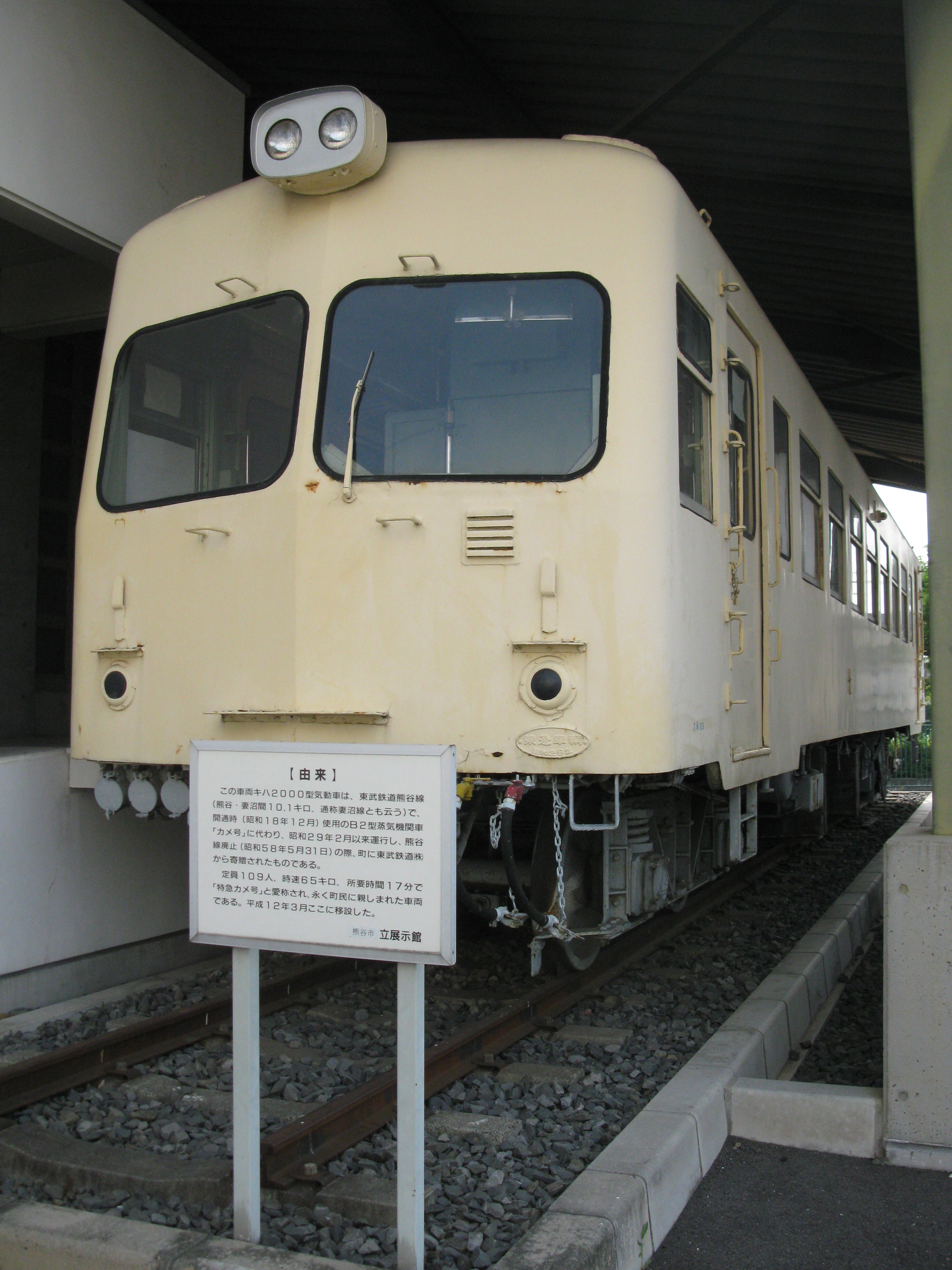
Preserved KiHa 2000 series DMU

==== Steam locomotives ====
- Tobu B1 Class 4-4-0 (1898)
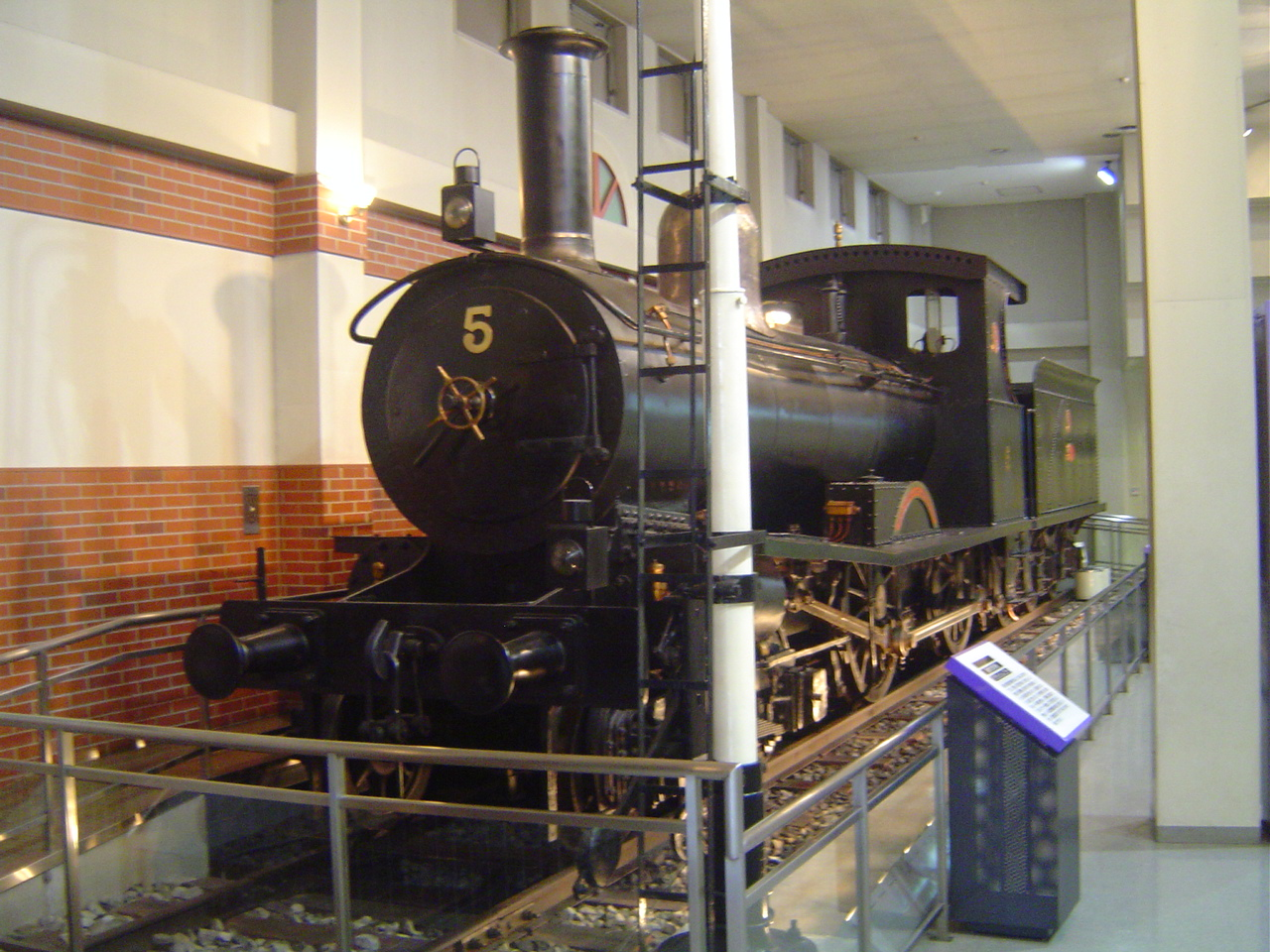
Preserved Tobu Railway B1 Class 4-4-0
