= Yōko Funato =

Japanese Shogi player

- Native name: 船戸陽子
- Born: April 23, 1974 (age 51)
- Hometown: Shibuya, Tokyo

Career
- Achieved professional status: March 17, 1988 (aged 13)
- Badge Number: JSA W-25; LPSA W-18
- Rank: Women's 3-dan
- Retired: July 8, 2024 (aged 50)
- Teacher: Toshio Takayanagi (Honorary 9-dan)

Websites
- LPSA profile page

Yōko Funato (船戸 陽子, Funato Yōko; born April 23, 1974) is a Japanese retired women's professional shogi player ranked 3-dan. She is a member of the Ladies Professional Shogi-players' Association of Japan.

== Women's shogi professional ==
=== Promotion history ===
Funato's promotion was follows.

- Women's Professional Apprentice League: 1986
- 3-kyū: March 17, 1988
- 1-kyū: March 29, 1990
- 1-dan: March 11, 1991
- 2-dan: April 1, 2000
- 3-dan: January 2020
- Retired: July 8, 2024

Note: All ranks are women's professional ranks.
