= Hiromi Nakakura =

Japanese shogi player

- Native name: 中倉宏美
- Born: January 26, 1979 (age 46)
- Hometown: Fuchū, Tokyo

Career
- Achieved professional status: October 1, 1995 (aged 16)
- Badge Number: JSA W-38; LPSA W-12
- Rank: Women's 2-dan
- Teacher: Kōji Horiguchi (7-dan)

Websites
- LPSA profile page

Hiromi Nakakura (中倉 宏美, Nakakura Hiromi; born January 26, 1979) is a Japanese women's professional shogi player ranked 2-dan. She is the current representative director of the Ladies Professional Shogi-players' Association of Japan (LPSA).

== Women's shogi professional ==
=== Promotion history ===
Nakakura's promotion history is as follows:

- 2-kyū: October 1995
- 1-kyū: April 1, 1996
- 1-dan: April 1, 2001
- 2-dan: January 21, 2009

Note: All ranks are women's professional ranks.

== LPSA representative director ==
Nakakura was selected to replace Sachio Ishibashi as representative director of the Ladies Professional Shogi-players' Association of Japan (LPSA) in February 2014. She was re-elected as representative director in 2016,2018, 2020 and 2022.

== Personal life ==
Nakakura's sister Akiko is a retired women's professional shogi player.
