= Saori Shimai =

Former Japanese Shogi player

- Native name: 島井咲緒里
- Born: May 15, 1980 (age 46)
- Hometown: Nankoku, Kōchi

Career
- Achieved professional status: April 1, 1996 (aged 15)
- Badge number: JSA W-39; LPSA W-13
- Rank: Women's 2-dan
- Retired: July 6, 2026 (aged 46)
- Teacher: Keiji Mori (9-dan)
- Career record: 171–281 (.378)

Websites
- LPSA profile page

Saori Shimai (島井 咲緒里, Shimai Saori; born May 15, 1980) is a Japanese retired women's professional shogi player who achieved the rank of 2-dan. As of July 2023, she is serving as an executive director of Ladies Professional Shogi-players' Association of Japan (LPSA).

== Women's shogi professional ==
On July 1, 2026, the LPSA announced on its official website that Shimai has met the criteria for mandatory retirement as an active women's professional and that her retirement would become official upon completion of her final scheduled game on July 6. She finished her career with a record of 171 wins and 281 loses for a winning percentage of 0.378.

=== Promotion history ===
Shimai's promotion history is as follows:

- Women's Professional Apprentice League: April 1995
- 2-kyū: April 1, 1996
- 1-kyū: April 1, 2001
- 1-dan: April 1, 2003
- 2-dan: January 16, 2012
- Retired: July 6, 2026

Note: All ranks are women's professional ranks.

== LPSA director ==
Shimai was chosen to be a director of the LPSA for the first time in February 2014, and reelected to the same post in February 2016. In February 2018, she was chosen to be one of the organization's two executive directors. She was reelected as an executive director in 2020 and 2022.

== Personal life ==
Shimai was married to professional shogi player Hiroaki Yokoyama. The couple married in July 2011, but divorced in 2020.
