= Hiroaki Yokoyama =

Japanese shogi player

- Native name: 横山 泰明
- Born: October 16, 1980 (age 45)
- Hometown: Tama, Tokyo

Career
- Achieved professional status: October 1, 2002 (aged 21)
- Badge Number: 246
- Rank: 7-dan
- Teacher: Noboru Sakurai (8-dan)
- Meijin class: B2
- Ryūō class: 4

Websites
- JSA profile page

Hiroaki Yokoyama (横山 泰明, Yokoyama Hiroaki; born October 16, 1980) is a Japanese professional shogi player ranked 7-dan.

== Early life and apprenticeship ==
Hiroaki Yokoyama was born on October 16, 1980, in Tama, Tokyo. He was accepted into the Japan Shogi Association's apprentice school at the rank of 6-kyū as a student of shogi professional Noboru Sakurai in August 1993, was promoted to 1-dan in July 1999, and finally obtained full professional status and corresponding rank of 4-dan in October 2002.

== Shogi professional ==
=== Promotion history ===
The promotion history for Yokoyama is as follows:

- 6-kyū: 1993
- 1-dan: 1999
- 4-dan: October 1, 2002
- 5-dan: October 30, 2007
- 6-dan: December 7, 2012
- 7-dan: September 11, 2019

=== Awards and honors ===
Yokoyama received the Japan Shogi Association's 42nd Annual Shogi Award for "Most Consecutive Victories" for April 2014 – March 2015.

== Personal life ==
Yokoyama is a graduate of Chuo University. He has been married to LPSA professional Saori Shimai since July 2011.
