= Nishiarai Station =

Railway station in Tokyo, Japan

Coordinates: 35.7771°N 139.7901°E

TS13 Nishiarai Station 西新井駅
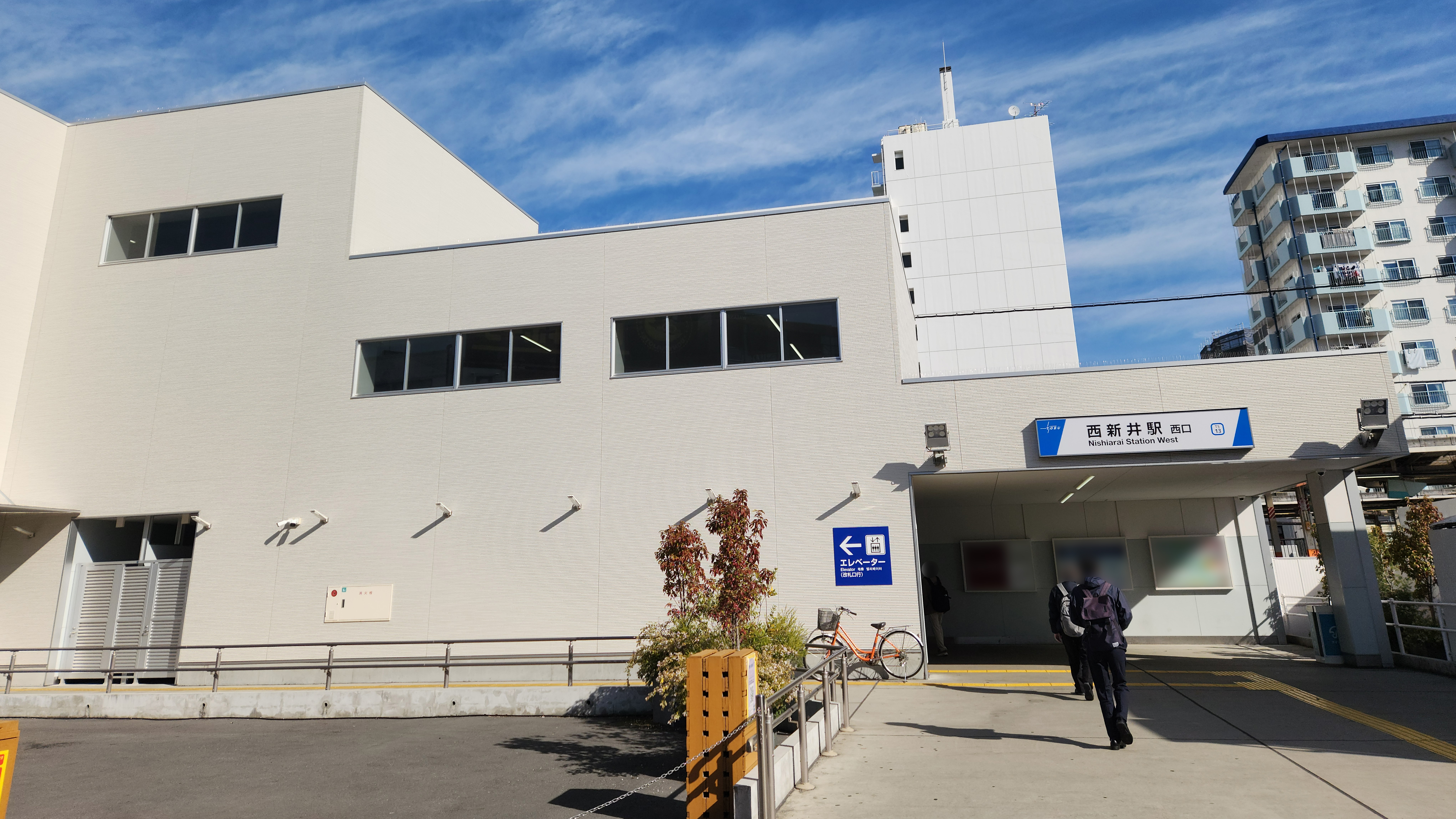
- West exit on November 2025

General information
- Location: Adachi, Tokyo （足立区西新井栄町2-1-1） Japan
- Operator: Tobu Railway
- Lines: Tobu Skytree Line, Tobu Daishi Line.

Other information
- Station code: TS-13

History
- Opened: 1899

Passengers
- FY2024: 31,589 daily boardings

Services
Preceding station	Tobu Railway	Following station
Kita-Senju TS09 towards Oshiage	Tobu Skytree Line Express	Sōka TS16 towards Tōbu-Dōbutsu-Kōen
Kita-Senju TS09 towards Asakusa	Tobu Skytree Line Section Express	Sōka TS16 towards Tōbu-Dōbutsu-Kōen
Kita-Senju TS09 towards Oshiage	Tobu Skytree Line Semi Express	Sōka TS16 towards Tōbu-Dōbutsu-Kōen
Kita-Senju TS09 towards Asakusa	Tobu Skytree Line Section Semi Express	Sōka TS16 towards Tōbu-Dōbutsu-Kōen
Umejima TS12 towards Asakusa	Tobu Skytree Line Local	Takenotsuka TS14 towards Tōbu-Dōbutsu-Kōen
Daishimae TS51 Terminus	Daishi Line	Terminus
Location

Nishiarai Station (西新井駅, Nishiarai-eki) is a railway station in Adachi, Tokyo, Japan. It is operated by private railway operator Tobu Railway.

== Lines ==
The station is served by the Tobu Skytree Line and Tobu Daishi Line.

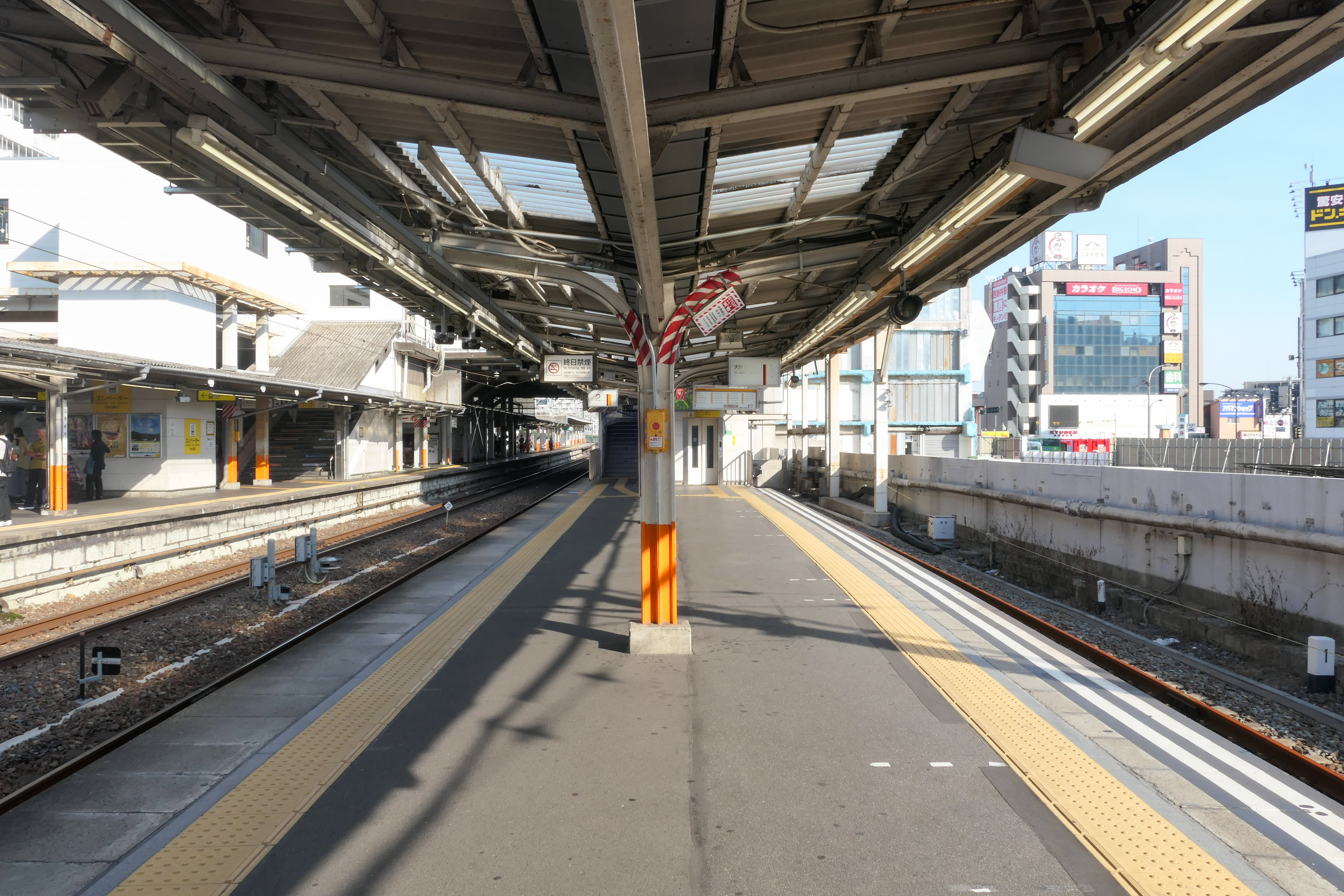
The Tōbu-Dōbutsu-Kōen-bound platform in July 2024

== Station layout ==
The station consists of three island platforms serving six tracks.

=== Platforms ===
1/2	Tobu Daishi Line	for Daishimae
3	Tobu Skytree Line	for Kasukabe and Tōbu-Dōbutsu-Kōen; Tobu Isesaki Line for Kuki, Tatebayashi and Ōta; Tōbu Nikkō Line for Minami-Kurihashi
4	Tobu Skytree Line	for Kita-Koshigaya, Kasukabe, and Tōbu-Dōbutsu-Kōen; Tobu Nikko Line for Minami-Kurihashi
5	Tobu Skytree Line	for Kita-Senju, Hikifune, and Asakusa; Tokyo Metro Hibiya Line for Ueno and Naka-meguro
6	Tobu Skytree Line	for Kita-Senju, Hikifune, and Asakusa; Tokyo Metro Hanzomon Line for Shibuya; Tokyu Den-en-toshi Line for Chūō-rinkan

== History ==
The station opened on 27 August 1899.

From 17 March 2012, station numbering was introduced on all Tobu lines, with Nishiarai Station becoming "TS-13".

== Passenger statistics ==
In fiscal 2024, the station was used by an average of 31,589 passengers daily (boarding passengers only).
