= Daishimae Station =

Railway station in Tokyo, Japan

Coordinates: 35.7789°N 139.7815°E

TS51 Daishimae Station 大師前駅
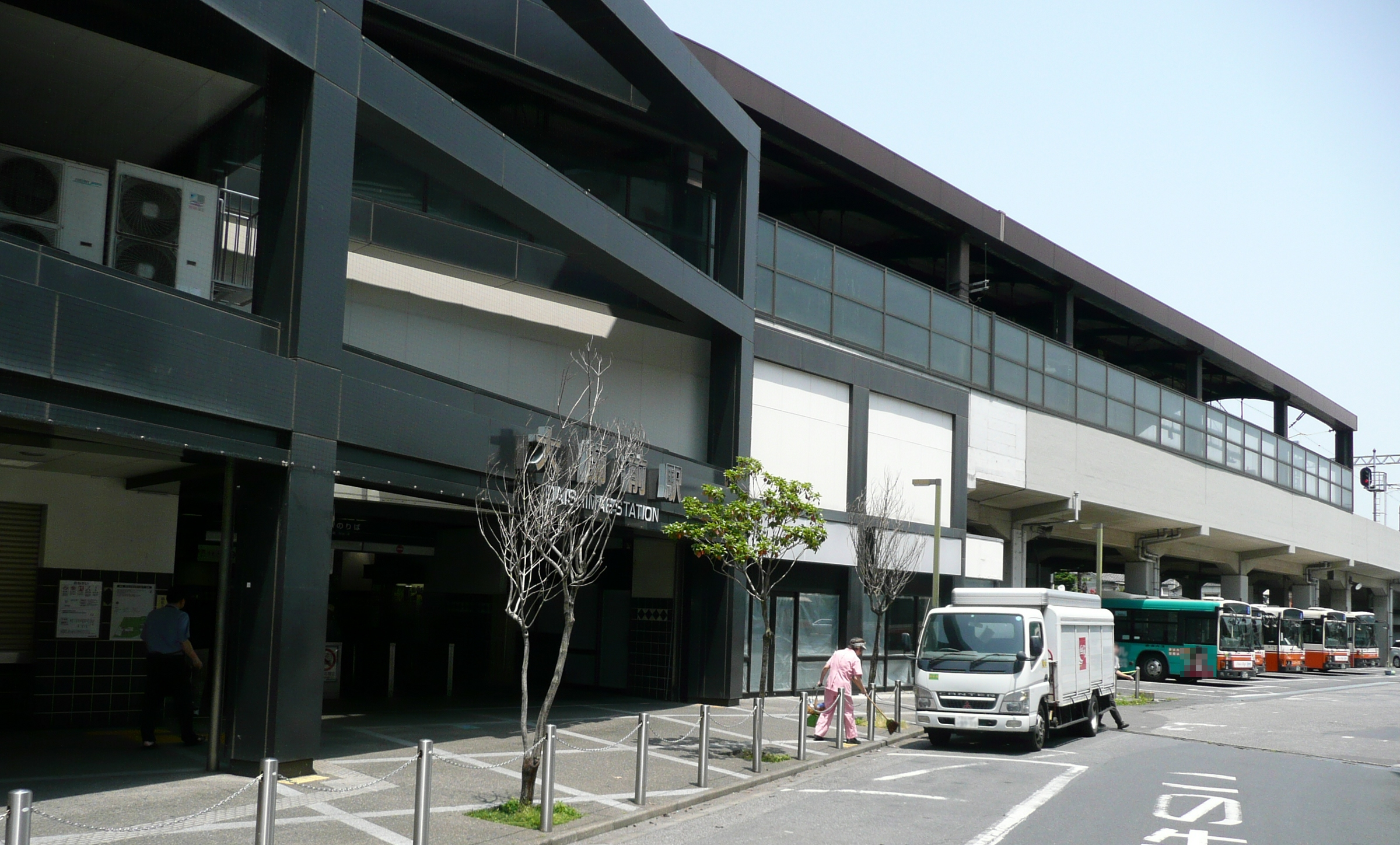
- Station exterior, May 2011

General information
- Location: 1-3-1 Nishiarai, Adachi, Tokyo （足立区西新井1-3-1） Japan
- Operator: Tobu Railway
- Line: Tobu Daishi Line
- Connections: Bus terminal

History
- Opened: 1931

Passengers
- 13,613 daily

Services
Preceding station	Tobu Railway	Following station
Terminus	Daishi Line	Nishiarai TS13 Terminus
Location

Daishimae Station (大師前駅, Daishimae-eki) is a railway station on the Tobu Daishi Line in Adachi, Tokyo, Japan, operated by the private railway operator Tobu Railway.

== Lines ==
Daishimae Station forms the terminus of the 1.0 km Tobu Daishi Line from Nishiarai Station.

== Station layout ==
The station consists of a single terminating side platform serving one track. There are no automatic ticket gates nor automatic ticket machines installed at this station. Fare collection and ticket sales are conducted at the transfer walkway at Nishiarai Station.

=== Platforms ===
1	Tobu Daishi Line	for Nishiarai

== History ==
The station opened on 20 December 1931.

== Surrounding area ==
- Adachi Ward Office
- Sōjiji Temple (Nishiarai Daishi)
- Oouchi Hospital
