= Akiko Nakakura =

Japanese Shogi player (born 1977)

Akiko Nakakura (中倉 彰子, Nakakura Akiko; born March 2, 1977) is a Japanese retired women's professional shogi player who achieved the rank of 2-dan.

== Women's shogi professional ==
=== Promotion history ===
The promotion history of Nakakura was as follows.

- 2--kyū: April 1, 1994
- 1-kyū: April 1, 2000
- 1-dan: April 1, 2002
- Retired: March 2015
- 2-dan: April 2017

== Personal life ==
Nakakura's sister, Hiromi, is also a women's professional shogi player. The 2001 Japanese movie Travail about a pair of sisters who are women's professional shogi players is partly modeled upon their careers and the sisters served as consultants for the film.

Nakakura is married to professional shogi player Makoto Chūza. The couple married in November 2003, and have three children.
