= Sachio Ishibashi =

- Native name: 石橋幸緒
- Born: November 25, 1980 (age 44)
- Hometown: Koganei, Tokyo

Career
- Achieved professional status: October 1, 1993 (aged 12)
- Badge Number: JSA W-33; LPSA W-10
- Rank: Women's 4-dan
- Retired: January 28, 2014 (aged 33)
- Teacher: Ichiyo Shimizu (6-dan)
- Major titles won: 3
- Tournaments won: 7

Websites
- Sachio Ishibashi on Twitter

Sachio Ishibashi (石橋 幸緒, Ishibashi Sachio; born November 25, 1980) is a Japanese retired women's professional shogi player ranked 4-dan. She is a former representative director of the Ladies Professional Shogi-players' Association of Japan. She is also a former Women's Ōi and Women's Ōshō title holder.

== Promotion history ==
Ishibashi's promotion history was as follows.

- 1993: Women's Professional Apprentice League
- 1993, October 1: 2-kyū
- 1995, April 1: 1-kyū
- 1996, April 1: 1-dan
- 1996, September 2: 2-dan
- 1999, June 29: 3-dan
- 2004, July 23: 4-dan

Note: All ranks are women's professional ranks.

== Titles and other championships ==
Ishibashi appeared in women's professional shogi major title matches nine times and won three titles. She won the 21st Women's Ōshō title in 1999, and the 18th and 19th Women's Ōi titles in 2007 and 2008. In addition to major titles, Ishibashi won five JSA run shogi non-title tournaments, and two LPSA run non-title tournaments.

=== Major titles ===
Title	Years	Number of times overall
Women's Ōshō	1999	1
Women's Ōi	2007–08	2

=== Other championships ===
Tournament	Years	Number of times
^{*}Ladies Open Tournament	1999, 2002, 2005	3
^{*}Kajima Cup	2002, 2005	2
^{*}Ladies Invitation Cup (LPSA)	2009	1
^{*}Tenga Cup (LPSA)	2011	1

Note: Tournaments marked with an asterisk (*) are no longer held or currently suspended.

== Awards and honors ==
Ishibashi received the Japan Shogi Association's Annual Shogi Awards for "Women's Professional of the Year" for the April 1999 – March 2000 shogi year, and the "Women's Professional Award" for the April 2002 – March 2003 shogi year.
