= Tobu Daishi Line =

Railway line in Tokyo, Japan

Daishi Line

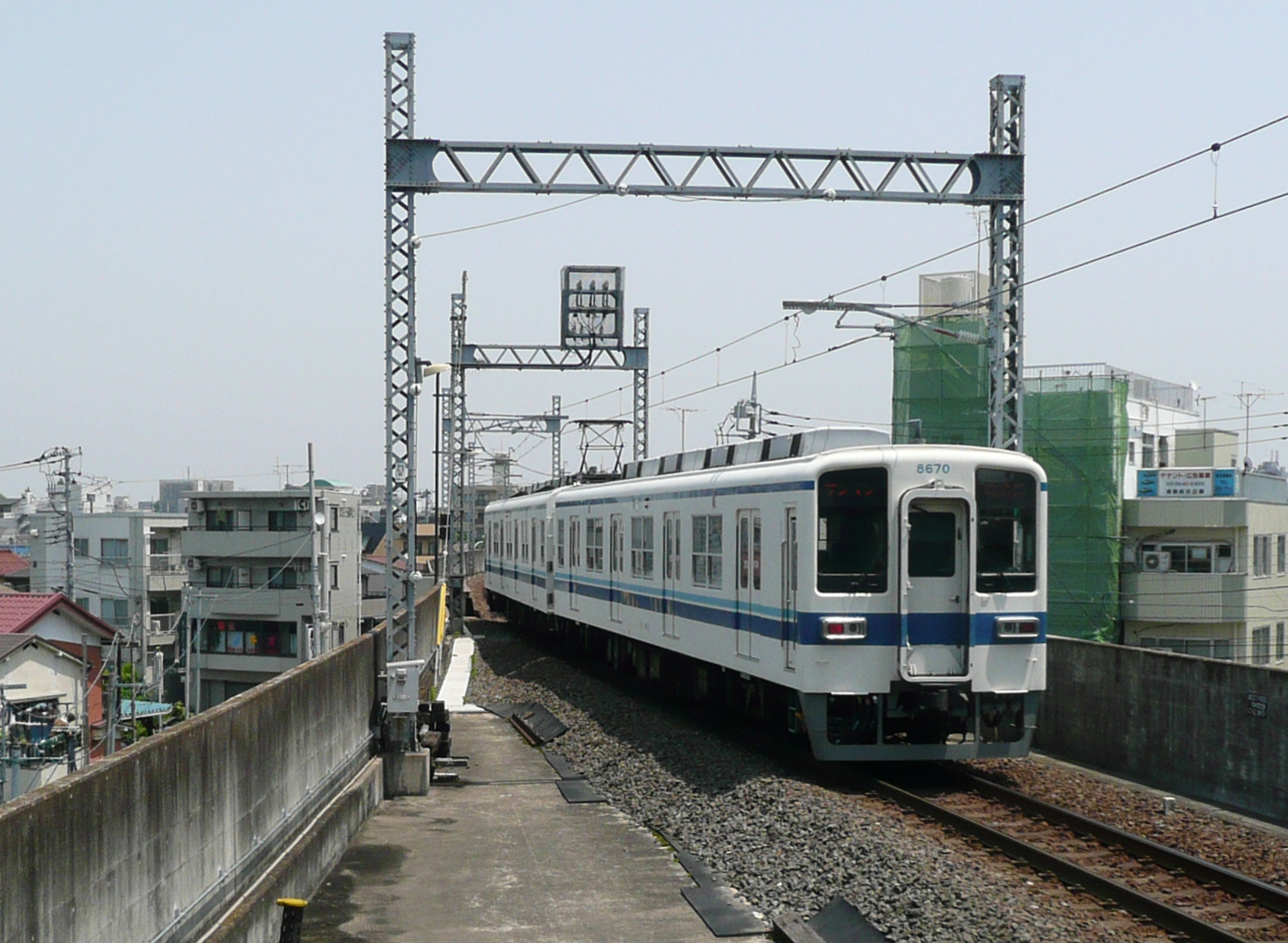
- An 8000 series train on the Daishi Line in May 2011

Overview
- Native name: 大師線
- Status: In service
- Owner: Tobu Railway Co., Ltd.
- Locale: Tokyo
- Termini: Nishiarai; Daishimae
- Stations: 2

Service
- Type: Commuter rail
- System: Tobu Railway
- Route number: TS
- Operator(s): Tobu Railway Co., Ltd.
- Rolling stock: Tobu 8000 series

History
- Opened: 20 December 1931; 94 years ago

Technical
- Line length: 1.0 km (0.62 mi)
- Num of tracks: Single-track
- Track gauge: 1,067 mm (3 ft 6 in)
- Electrification: 1,500 V DC (overhead catenary)
- Operating speed: 60 km/h (37 mph)
- Signalling: Automatic closed block
- Train protection system: Tobu ATS

The Tobu Daishi Line (東武大師線, Tōbu Daishi-sen) is a 1.0 km (0.62 mi) railway line in Adachi, Tokyo, Japan, owned and operated by the private railway operator Tobu Railway. It connects Nishiarai Station to Daishimae Station.

As fare collection and ticket purchases are conducted at Nishiarai, excluding those with a commuter pass or special ticket, passengers are able to board the train from Daishimae without a valid ticket.

== Services ==
All trains on the line operate as a shuttle service between Nishiarai and Daishimae.

Services operate every 10 minutes (every 12-15 minutes at early morning and late at night). Running time is 2 minutes.

== Stations ==
No.	Name	Japanese	Distance (km)	Connections	Location
TS13	Nishiarai	西新井	0.0	Tobu Skytree Line (TS13)	Adachi, Tokyo
TS51	Daishimae	大師前	1.0		Adachi, Tokyo

== History ==
The line opened on December 20, 1931, as the Tobu Nishi-Ita Line from Nishiarai to Daishimae, with a total distance of 1.1 km. This line formed part of the proposed Tobu Nishi-Ita Line (東武西板線) which was never completed. The Tobu Nishi-Ita Line was intended to link the Tobu Isesaki Line and Tobu Tojo Line after the merger of Tobu Railways and Tojo Railways in 1920 to allow for efficient transfer of rolling stock, and to improve the service for residents along the line. The plan was to connect Nishiarai (西新井) Station to Kami-Itabashi (上板橋) Station, hence the name Nishiita (西板) Line.

There were multiple reasons for the cancelation of the line. The Great Kantō Earthquake occurred in 1923, which was between the time of applying for and granting of the railway license. As such priority was given to the restoration of existing lines. The Arakawa River flood drainage canal was still under construction which meant the design of the railway bridge could not be finalized. There was the issue of the high cost of constructing bridges over the Arakawa and Sumida Rivers. Problems arose from requests for rerouting from town officials in the proposed area, and the rapid urbanization of the area around the proposed route meant the line would have been very expensive to construct, and the probability of turning a profit was low. One year after the opening of the line in 1932, the construction plan between Shikahama to Kami-Itabashi was abandoned. As for the construction between Daishimae to Shikihama, a proposal for the extension of the construction timeframe was submitted to the government but was rejected in June of 1937, and the railway license expired after.

Operation was suspended from May 20, 1945. Operations resumed from May 21, 1947, with the line renamed Tobu Daishi Line.

On December 1, 1968, Daishimae station was relocated due to road extension, shortening the line by 100 m. On July 26, 1991, the track was elevated.

Wanman driver-only operation started on March 19, 2003.

From 17 March 2012, station numbering was introduced on all Tobu lines. Tobu Daishi Line stations were numbered prefixed with the letters "TS".

As the plan for the Nishi-Ita Line was abandoned, rolling stock transfers between the Tobu Tojo Line and the Tobu Isesaki Line are conducted through the Chichibu Main Line.

In 2027, Tobu 10000 series which run on Daishi Line will be replaced by Tobu 1000 series which is corresponded to One-person operation and Self-driving. After 2028, it will start unmanned operation on Daishi Line.
