= Representative director (Japan) =

Most senior executive of a Japanese company

Representative director (代表取締役, daihyō-torishimariyaku) is the position of the most senior executive in charge of managing a corporation which is registered in Japan. As regulated by the Companies Act of Japan, joint-stock companies incorporated in Japan must have a representative director. The representative director typically reports to the company's board of directors and is responsible for maximizing the value of the business.

== Responsibilities ==
Corporations registered in Japan have multiple directors. The representative director is a type of director with the company's highest authority and possesses the right to enter into business and sign legal contracts on behalf of the corporation in Japan. The person holding this position is registered publicly on the official corporate register. Their statements legally bind the corporation.

== Limitations ==
In Japan, a representative director is not considered to be an employee of that company and is unable to receive certain benefits which are accorded to employees.
