= Toyoharu Station =

Railway station in Kasukabe, Saitama Prefecture, Japan

TD08 Toyoharu Station 豊春駅
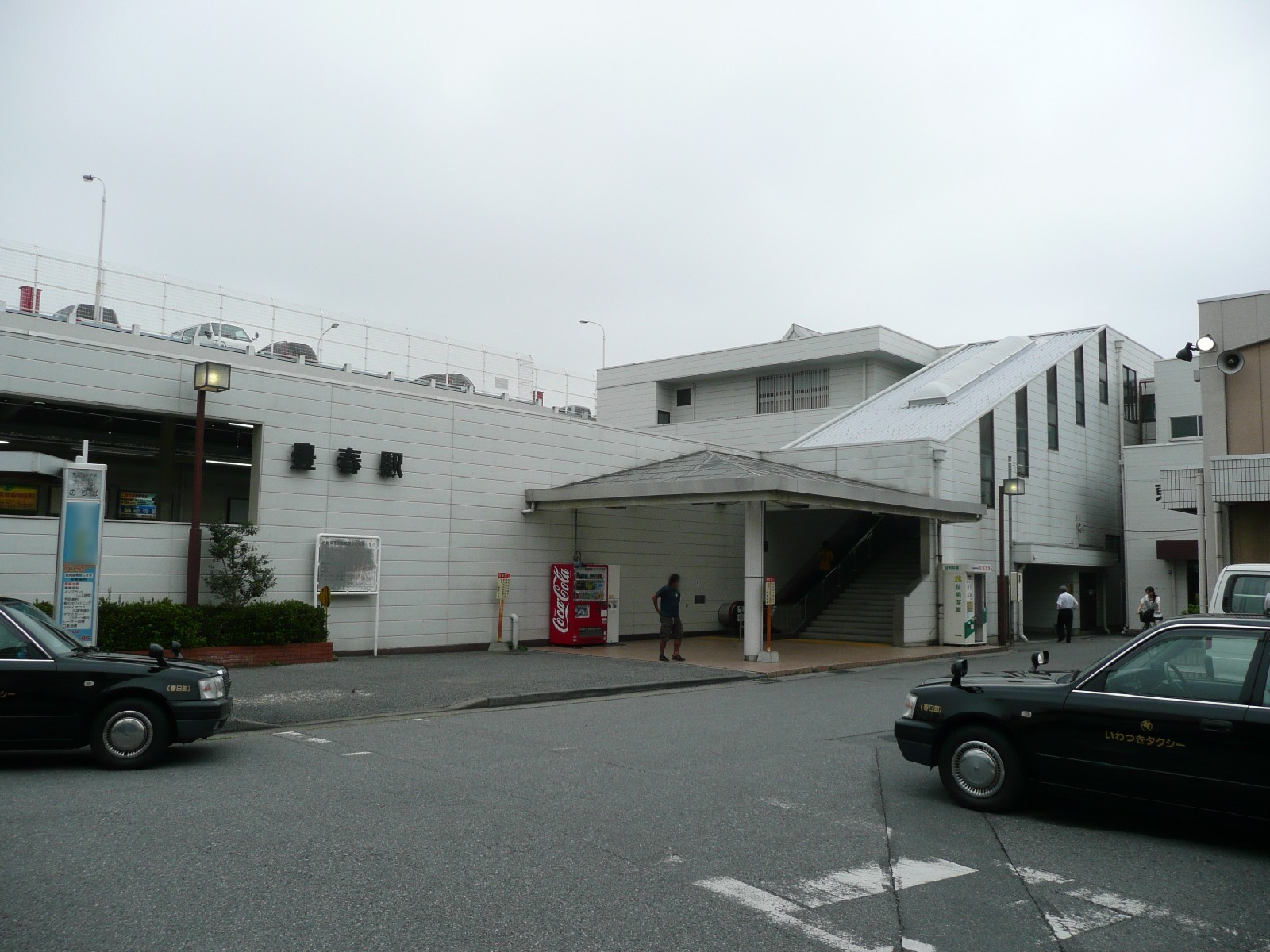
- Toyoharu Station in September 2008

General information
- Location: 1-136 Kamihiruda, Kasukabe-shi, Saitama-ken 344-0046; Japan
- Coordinates: 35.9678°N 139.7261°E
- Operator: Tōbu Railway
- Line: Tōbu Urban Park Line
- Distance: 12.2 km from Ōmiya
- Platforms: 2 side platforms
- Tracks: 2

Other information
- Station code: TD-08
- Website: Official website

History
- Opened: 17 November 1929; 96 years ago

Passengers
- FY2019: 13,398 daily

Services
Preceding station	Tobu Railway	Following station
Higashi-Iwatsuki TD07 towards Ōmiya	Urban Park Liner from Asakusa	Yagisaki One-way operation
Higashi-Iwatsuki TD07 towards Ōmiya	Tōbu Urban Park Line Local	Yagisaki TD09 towards Funabashi
Location
- Location within Saitama Prefecture Location within Japan

Toyoharu Station (豊春駅, Toyoharu-eki) is a passenger railway station located in the city of Kasukabe, Saitama, Japan, operated by the private railway operator Tōbu Railway. The station is numbered "TD-08".

== Lines ==
Toyoharu Station is served by the 62.7 km (39.0 mi) Tōbu Urban Park Line (formerly known as the "Tōbu Noda Line") from Ōmiya in Saitama Prefecture to Funabashi in Chiba Prefecture, and lies 12.2 km (7.6 mi) from the western terminus of the line at Ōmiya.

== Station layout ==
The station consists of two ground-level opposing side platforms serving two tracks, with an elevated station building above.

=== Platforms ===
1	■ Tōbu Urban Park Line	for Iwatsuki and Ōmiya
3	■ Tōbu Urban Park Line	for Kasukabe and Kashiwa

== History ==
Toyoharu Station opened on 17 November 1929.

From 17 March 2012, station numbering was introduced on all Tōbu lines, with Toyoharu Station becoming "TD-08".

== Passenger statistics ==
In fiscal 2019, the station was used by an average of 13,398 passengers daily.

== Surrounding area ==
- Kasukabe Toyoharu Post Office
