= Ōwada Station (Saitama) =

Railway station in Saitama, Japan

TD04 Ōwada Station 大和田駅
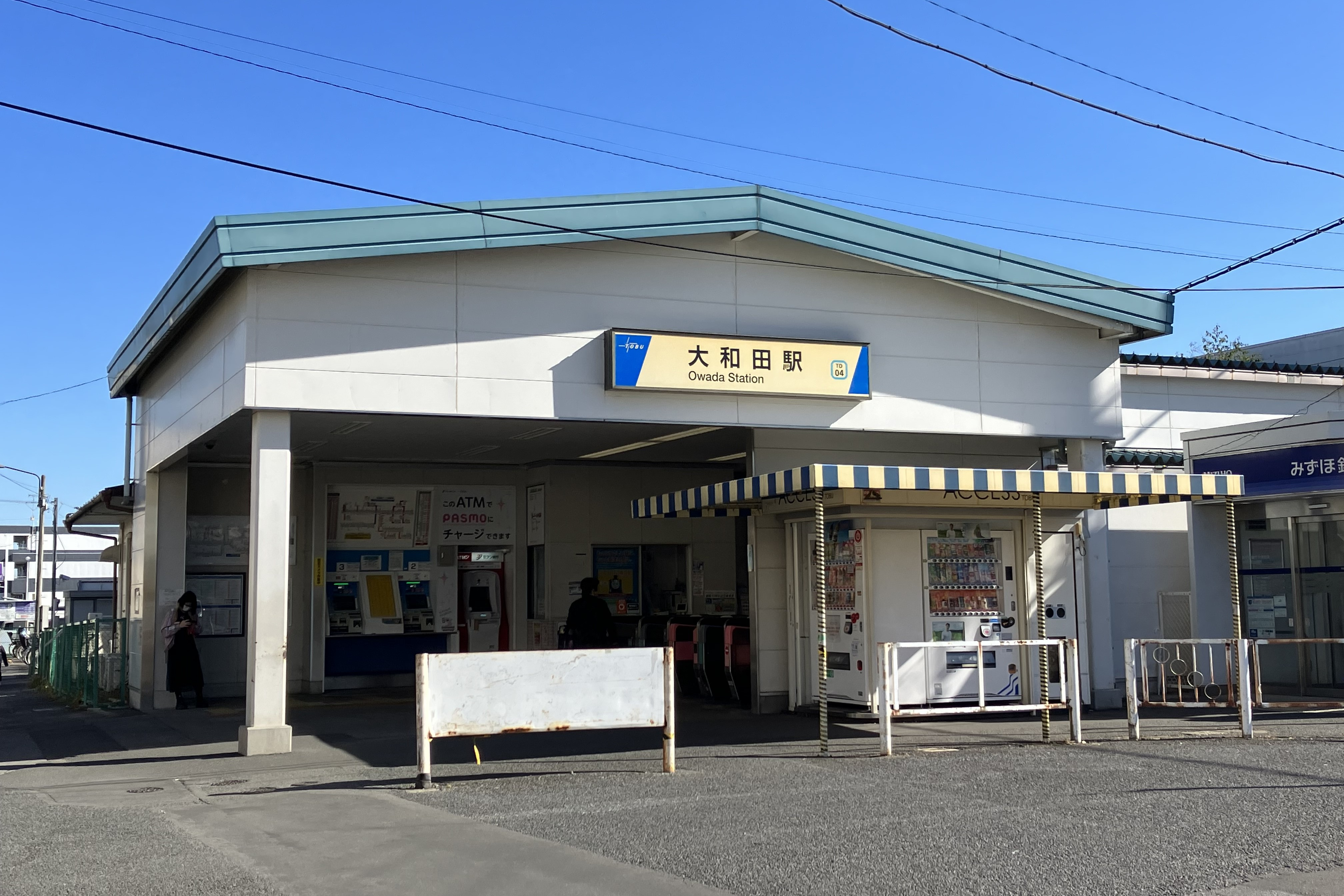
- Ōwada Station in 2024

General information
- Location: 31-172-1 Junochō, Minuma-ku, Saitama-shi, Saitama-ken 337-0053; Japan
- Coordinates: 35°55′46″N 139°39′02″E
- Operator: Tōbu Railway
- Line: Tōbu Urban Park Line
- Distance: 3.0 km from Ōmiya
- Platforms: 2 side platforms

Other information
- Station code: TD-04
- Website: Official website

History
- Opened: 17 November 1929; 96 years ago

Passengers
- FY2019: 20,003 daily

Services
| Preceding station | Tobu Railway | Following station |
|---|---|---|
| Ōmiya-kōen TD03 towards Ōmiya | Tōbu Urban Park Line Local | Nanasato TD05 towards Funabashi |
Location
- Location within Saitama Prefecture Location within Japan

Ōwada Station (大和田駅, Ōwada-eki) is a passenger railway station on the Tobu Urban Park Line located in Minuma-ku, Saitama, Saitama Prefecture, Japan, operated by the private railway operator Tōbu Railway.

== Lines ==
Ōwada Station is served by the 62.7 km (39.0 mi) Tōbu Urban Park Line from Ōmiya in Saitama Prefecture to Funabashi in Chiba Prefecture, and lies 3.9 km (2.4 mi) from the western terminus of the Tōbu Urban Park Line at Ōmiya.

== Station layout ==
The station consists of two opposed side platforms serving two tracks, connected to the station building by a footbridge.

=== Platforms ===
| 1 | ■ Tōbu Urban Park Line | for Iwatsuki, Kasukabe, and Kashiwa |
| 2 | ■ Tōbu Urban Park Line | for Ōmiya |

== History ==
The station opened on 17 November 1929.

From 17 March 2012, station numbering was introduced on all Tōbu lines, with Ōwada Station becoming "TD-04".

== Passenger statistics ==
In fiscal 2019, the station was used by an average of 20,003 passengers daily.

== Surrounding area ==
- Ōwada Park
- Saitama City Minuma Ward Office

== See also ==
- List of railway stations in Japan
