= Saitama 16th district =

- Parliamentary constituency for the Japanese House of Representatives
- Numbered map of the Saitama Prefecture single seats
- Prefecture: Saitama
- Proportional District: Northern Kanto
- Electorate: 374,624

Current constituency
- Created: 2022
- Seats: One
- Party: LDP
- Representatives: Shinako Tsuchiya
- Municipalities: Iwatsuki-ku of Saitama city. Cities of Kasukabe and Yoshikawa. Matsubushi of Kita-Katsushika District.

Saitama 16th district (埼玉県第16区, Saitama-ken dai-ju-rokku or simply 埼玉16区, Saitama-ju-rokku) is a single-member constituency of the House of Representatives in the national Diet of Japan located in Saitama Prefecture.

== Areas covered ==
=== Since 2022 ===
- Part of Saitama city
  - Iwatsuki-ku
- Kasukabe
- Yoshikawa
- Part of Kita-Katsushika District
  - Matsubushi

== List of representatives ==
Representative	Party	Years served	Notes
Shinako Tsuchiya	LDP	2024 –	

== Election results ==
2026
Party	Candidate	Votes	%	±%
LDP	Shinako Tsuchiya	98,187	55.8	▲17.3
Centrist Reform	Sota Misumi	64,152	36.5	▼0.5
JCP	Ken Nagahori	13,579	7.7	▲0.4
Registered electors		371,147		
Turnout			49.34	▲1.30
LDP hold				

2024
Party	Candidate	Votes	%	±%
LDP	Shinako Tsuchiya	66,909	38.48	New
CDP	Sota Misumi (Won PR seat)	64,244	36.95	New
Ishin	Rika Nakamura	30,027	17.27	New
JCP	Ken Nagahori	12,691	7.30	New
Majority		2,665	1.53	
Registered electors		373,279		
Turnout			48.04	
LDP win (new seat)				
