= Minami-Sakurai Station (Saitama) =

Railway station in Kasukabe, Saitama Prefecture, Japan

Coordinates: 35°58′50″N 139°48′29″E

TD12 Minami-sakurai Station 南桜井駅
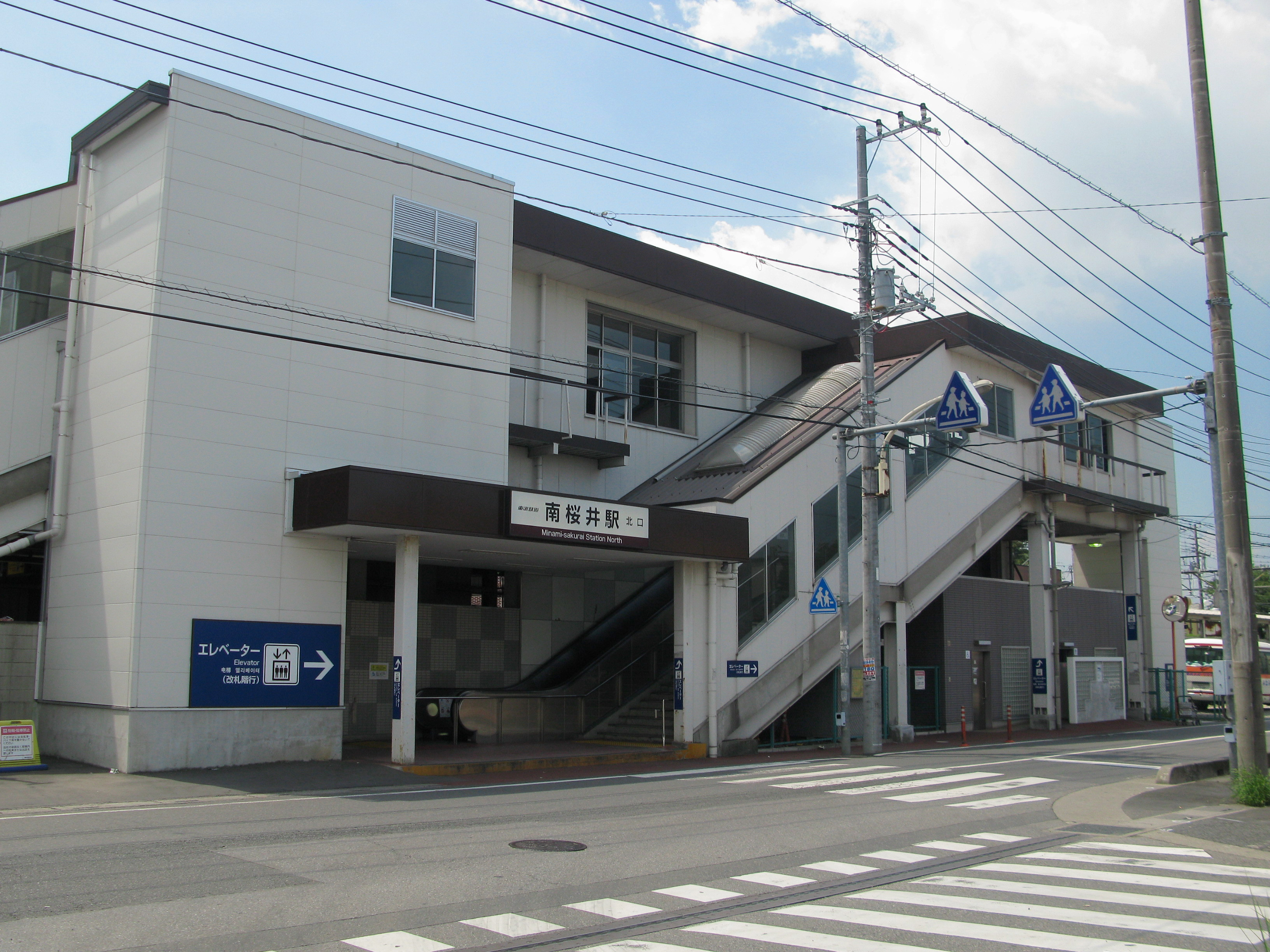
- Minami-sakurai Station north entrance in August 2012

General information
- Location: 118 Yonejima, Kasukabe-shi, Saitama-ken 344-0115; Japan
- Operator: Tōbu Railway
- Line: Tobu Urban Park Line
- Distance: 20.6 km from Ōmiya
- Platforms: 2 side platforms

Other information
- Station code: TD-12
- Website: Official website

History
- Opened: 9 December 1930; 95 years ago
- Former names: Naganuma Temporary Stop (to 1932)

Passengers
- FY2019: 14,515 daily

Services
Preceding station	Tobu Railway	Following station
Fujino-ushijima TD11 towards Ōmiya	Urban Park Liner	Kawama TD13 towards Kashiwa
Fujino-ushijima One-way operation	Urban Park Liner from Asakusa	Kawama TD13 towards Kashiwa
Fujino-ushijima TD11 towards Ōmiya	Tōbu Urban Park Line Express	Kawama TD13 towards Funabashi
Fujino-ushijima TD11 towards Ōmiya	Tōbu Urban Park Line Section Express	Kawama TD13 towards Kashiwa
Fujino-ushijima TD11 towards Ōmiya	Tōbu Urban Park Line Local	Kawama TD13 towards Funabashi
Location
- Location within Saitama Prefecture Location within Japan

Minami-sakurai Station (南桜井駅, Minami-sakurai-eki) is a passenger railway station located in the city of Kasukabe, Saitama, Japan, operated by the private railway operator Tōbu Railway. The station is numbered "TD-12".

== Lines ==
Minami-sakurai Station is served by the 62.7 km (39.0 mi) Tobu Urban Park Line (formerly known as the "Tobu Noda Line") from Ōmiya in Saitama Prefecture to Funabashi in Chiba Prefecture, and lies 20.6 km (12.8 mi) from the western terminus of the line at Ōmiya.

== Station layout ==
The station consists of two ground-level opposing side platforms serving two tracks, with an elevated station building located above.

=== Platforms ===
1	■ Urban Park Line	for Kasukabe, Iwatsuki, and Ōmiya
2	■ Urban Park Line	for Nodashi, Kashiwa, and Funabashi

== History ==
Minami-sakurai Station opened on 9 December 1930 as the Naganuma Temporary Stop (永沼臨時停留所; Naganuma Rinji Teiryujo). On 1 August 1932 it was relocated 400 meters towards Kashiwa and elevated in status to a full station with its present name. On 6 November 1943, a new station named Yonejima Station (米島駅, Yonejima eki) was established 800 meters in the direction of Kashiwa for freight operations. This station ceased operations on 30 September 1945, and was abolished on 23 December 1956, and Minami-sakurai Station was relocated to its location. From 17 March 2012, station numbering was introduced on the Tobu Noda Line, with Minami-sakurai Station becoming "TD-12".

== Passenger statistics ==
In fiscal 2019, the station was used by an average of 14,515 passengers daily.

== Surrounding area ==
- Metropolitan Area Outer Underground Discharge Channel ("G-Cans")
- Former Shōwa, Saitama Town Hall
- Shōwa Post Office

== See also ==
- List of railway stations in Japan
