= Takesato Station =

Railway station in Kasukabe, Saitama Prefecture, Japan

TS25 Takesato Station 武里駅
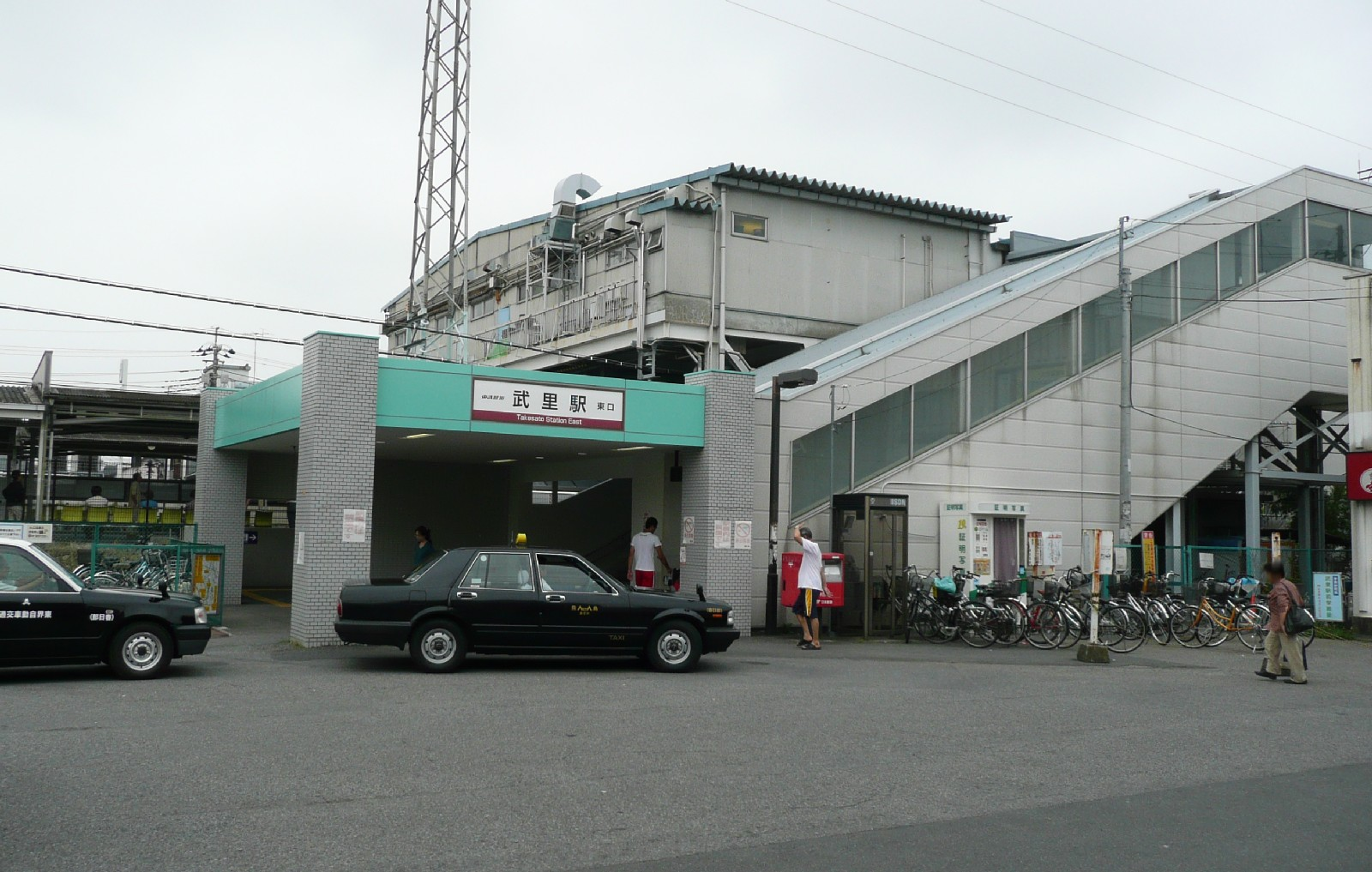
- Takesato Station, September 2008

General information
- Location: 450 Oba, Kasukabe City, Saitama Prefecture 344-0021; Japan
- Coordinates: 35.9492°N 139.7708°E
- Operator: Tōbu Railway
- Line: Tōbu Skytree Line
- Distance: 31.1 km (19.3 mi) from Asakusa
- Platforms: 2 side platforms
- Tracks: 2

Other information
- Station code: TS-25
- Website: Official website

History
- Opened: 20 December 1899; 126 years ago

Passengers
- FY2024: 7,135 daily boardings

Services
| Preceding station | Tobu Railway | Following station |
|---|---|---|
| Sengendai TS24 towards Oshiage | Tobu Skytree Line Semi Express | Ichinowari TS26 towards Tōbu-Dōbutsu-Kōen |
| Sengendai TS24 towards Asakusa | Tobu Skytree Line Section Semi Express Local | Ichinowari TS26 towards Tōbu-Dōbutsu-Kōen |
Location
- Location within Saitama Prefecture Location within Kanto Area Location within Japan

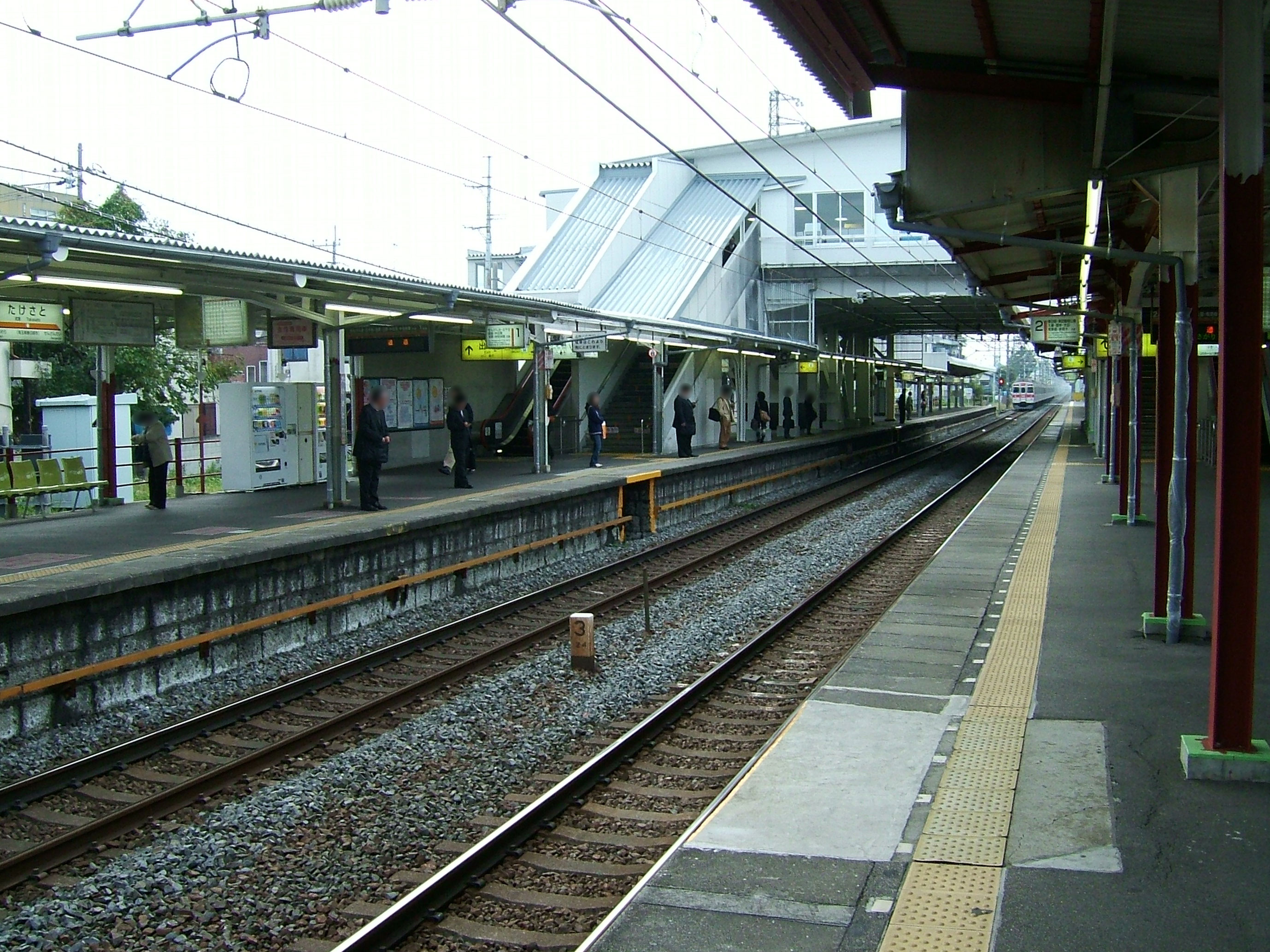
Takesato Station Platforms

Takesato Station (武里駅, Takesato-eki) is a passenger railway station located in the city of Kasukabe, Saitama, Japan, operated by the private railway operator Tōbu Railway.

== Line ==
The station is served by the Tōbu Skytree Line, and is 31.1 kilometers from the terminus of the line at Asakusa Station.

== Station layout ==
The station has two opposed side platforms serving two tracks, with an elevated station building above the tracks and platforms.

=== Platforms ===
| 1 | Tōbu Skytree Line | for Shin-Koshigaya, Kita-Senju, and Asakusa; Tokyo Metro Hanzomon Line for Shibuya; Tokyu Den-en-toshi Line for Chūō-rinkan; Tokyo Metro Hibiya Line for Ueno and Naka-meguro |
| 2 | Tōbu Skytree Line | for Kasukabe and Tōbu-Dōbutsu-Kōen; Tobu Isesaki Line for Kuki; Tōbu Nikkō Line for Minami-Kurihashi |

== History ==
Takesato Station opened on 20 December 1899. It was relocated to its present location in 1913, and the current station building was completed in 1967. From 17 March 2012, station numbering was introduced on all Tōbu lines, with Takesato Station becoming "TS-25".

== Passenger statistics ==
In fiscal 2024, the station was used by an average of 7,135 passengers daily (boarding passengers only).

== Surrounding area ==
- Takesato Housing District
- Takesato Post Office
- National Route 4

== See also ==
- List of railway stations in Japan
