= Kasukabe Girls' Senior High School =

Coordinates: 35.9795°N 139.7670°E

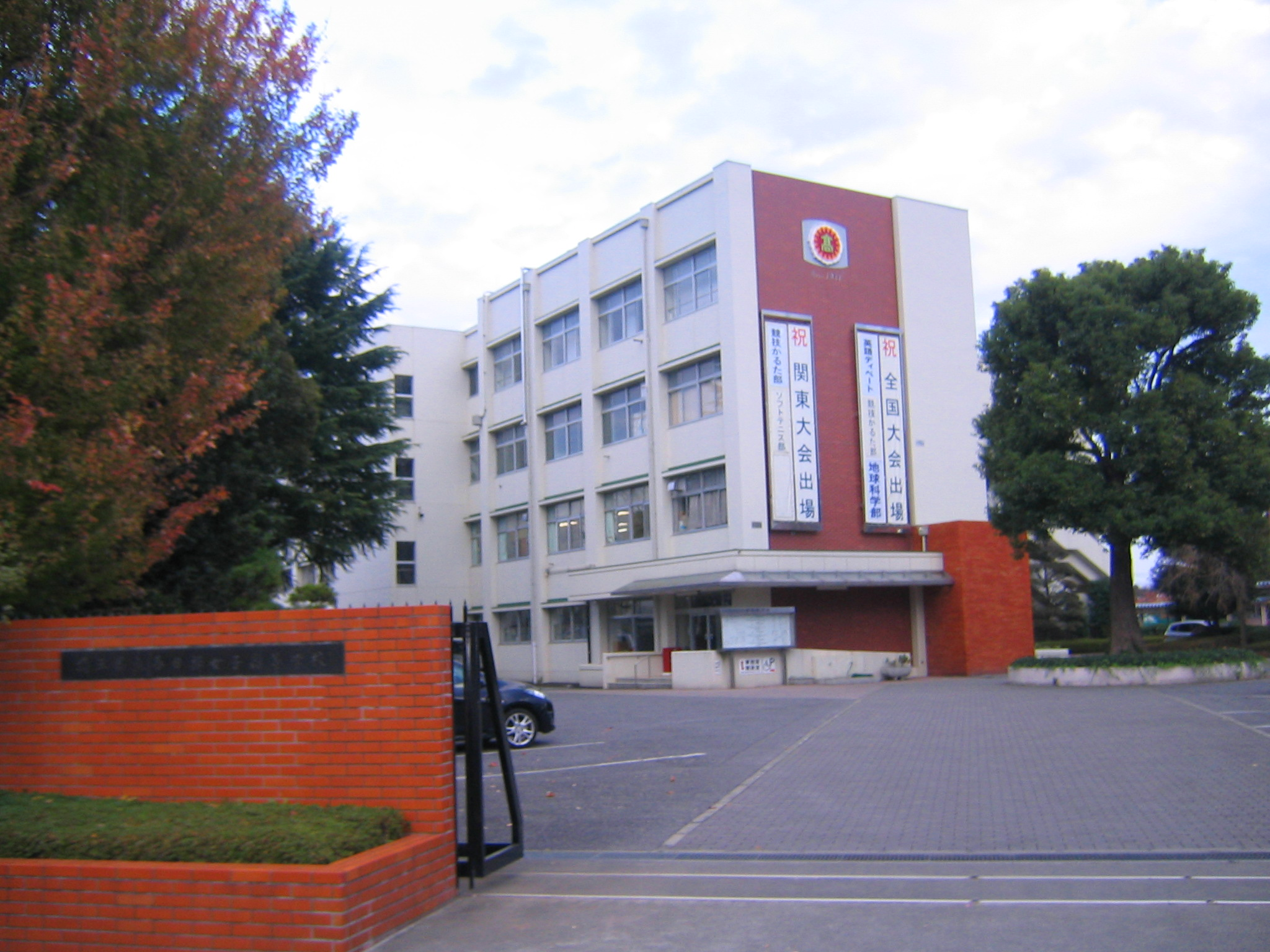

Location
- Kasukabe, Saitama; Japan

Information
- Type: Public school, single-sex
- Established: 1911
- Grades: 10 - 12
- Website: www.kasujo-h.spec.ed.jp

Kasukabe Girls' Senior High School (埼玉県立春日部女子高等学校) is a public high school in Kasukabe, Saitama, Japan.

== Summary ==
Kasukabe Girls' Senior High School, popularly known as Kasujo, operates according to a standard full-day system. It offers an ordinary education curriculum as well as a special foreign languages course. It one of the so-called Super English Language High Schools. Partnered with Ohio Northern University, the curriculum focuses on international relations.

== History ==
- 1911 - Kasukabe City Girl's Technical High School opens
- 1930 - Renamed Kasukabe Girls' Senior High School
- 1948 - Re-established as Kasukabe Girls' Senior High School with license from the Ministry of Education, Culture, Sports, Science and Technology
- 1996 - Foreign Languages program established
- 2010 - Celebration of the school's 100-year anniversary

== School song ==
The song, which has two verses, is played at school functions to the accompaniment of a mandolin guitar group. The first verse centres on filial piety and the second, on the teacher-student relationship. In the period leading up to and during the Second World War, there was a third verse in between the current two, which described the duty to a sovereign emperor. It was taken out in the post-war era.

- Before and during World War 2
  - 1st verse: filial piety
  - 2nd verse: duty and worship of emperor
  - 3rd verse: teacher-student relationship
- Post-war
  - 1st verse: filial piety
  - 2nd verse: teacher-student relationship

== Facilities ==
School facilities include the Foreign Language Annex, the Sunflower Building and the Sunflower Assembly Hall. The home-room classes, classroom facilities, as well as admission exams for the Foreign Language Curriculum classes are all in the Foreign Language Annex. However, ordinary curriculum students also use the annex from time to time.

Essentially a small gymnasium, the Sunflower Building houses, physical education classes as well as club activities such as kendo and badminton. It also serves as a place of refuge in the case of disaster both for students and the local neighbourhood. In case residents need to stay overnight, showers have been installed.

The Sunflower Assembly Hall is usually used as a cultural centre. On the first floor are cultural club activity rooms, student council rooms, a cafeteria, a laundry room, and baths. On the second floor are more cultural club activity rooms (not including woodwind and music clubs), and sleeping rooms for extended training sessions. These sleeping rooms, in addition to the koto club room and the cafeteria room, are also used by the sports clubs as extended training session lodging.

There is a two-storey building in the corner of the school grounds which was formerly used as extended training accommodation. It is used for woodwinds club activities as well as by the kyūdō (archery) club as a site for making udon noodles for the annual school cultural festival.

== School events ==
- First term
  - Ball sports meet
  - School excursion
- Summer holidays
  - Overseas study trip
- Second term
  - Culture festival
  - Sports festival
  - Marathon meet (in Watarase Basin)
- Third term
  - Farewell party

=== Culture and sports festival ===
- Nine triads of three classes, each representing one of the three school years, compete with one another during the festival. Because there are 10 classes in each of the second and third year cohorts, two classes have to combine to form nine groups.
- With the exception of the Culture Festival Committee and the Student Council, each competitive group member wears a T-shirt that the group designed for the occasion. Visitors during the festival vote for the most popular T-shirt design.
- Similarly, each group makes up their own "group dance" which they perform and is voted on by visitors.
- In both the culture and sports festivals, the school principal encourages participation with the "Kasujo call", a distinctive, traditional school cheer.
- Because the culture and sports festivals occur at the same time, as a pair they are referred to as the Kasujo festival.

=== Ball sports meet ===
- Similar to the above-mentioned Culture and Sports Festivals, different classes and school groups compete with one another. The sports include handball, volleyball, soft tennis, badminton, and dodge ball. Ball sport club members cannot compete in their club sport.

=== Marathon meet ===
- Previously called the "Power Walking Meet", in 2007 the name was changed to the "Marathon Meet".
- During the training, if the student does not meet the 20 km (or sometimes 30 km) quota, they will not be allowed to continue training after the Marathon Meet. However, according to the weather, teacher availability, and other factors affecting the training, some students will be allowed to fulfil their quota after the Meet. Because of this flexibility, barring extreme circumstances, the vast majority of students can fulfil their quota.
- During the Marathon Meet, each student should run 8 km within 1 hour and 20 minutes. In the middle of the course, at the 4 km mark, teachers organise a water refreshment station.
- Although the time limit is usually sufficient, students who do not achieve 8 km can make it up after school during the week of the Meet.

== Transport ==
The nearest railway station to the school is Kasukabe Station on the Tobu Skytree Line and the Tobu Urban Park Line, approximately 17 minutes away on foot.
