= Shinako Tsuchiya =

Japanese politician (born 1952)

Shinako Tsuchida
- 土屋 品子
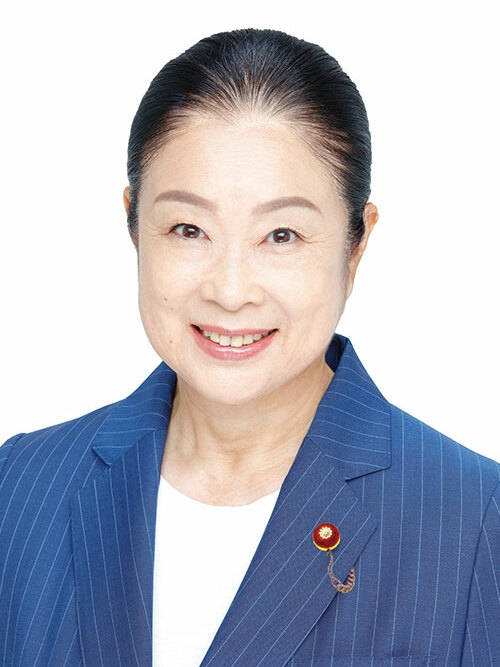
- Official portrait, 2023

Minister of Reconstruction
- In office 13 September 2023 – 1 October 2024
- Prime Minister: Fumio Kishida
- Preceded by: Hiromichi Watanabe
- Succeeded by: Tadahiko Ito

Member of the House of Representatives
- Incumbent
- Assumed office 16 December 2012
- Preceded by: Yōichirō Morioka
- Constituency: Saitama 13th (2012–2024); Saitama 16th (2024–present)
- In office 20 October 1996 – 21 July 2009
- Preceded by: Constituency established
- Succeeded by: Yōichirō Morioka
- Constituency: Saitama 13th

Personal details
- Born: 9 February 1952 (age 74) Minato, Tokyo, Japan
- Party: LDP (since 2001)
- Other political affiliations: Independent (1996–1999); Assembly of Independents (1999–2001)
- Parent: Yoshihiko Tsuchiya (father)
- Education: University of the Sacred Heart
- Website: つちや品子オフィシャルサイト

Shinako Tsuchiya (土屋 品子, Tsuchiya Shinako; born 2 February 1952) is a Japanese politician serving in the House of Representatives in the Diet (national legislature) as a member of the Liberal Democratic Party. A native of Kasukabe, Saitama and graduate of University of the Sacred Heart she was elected for the first time in 1996. Her father is Yoshihiko Tsuchiya, former governor of Saitama Prefecture.
