= Nanasato Station =

Railway station in Saitama, Japan

TD05 Nanasato Station 七里駅
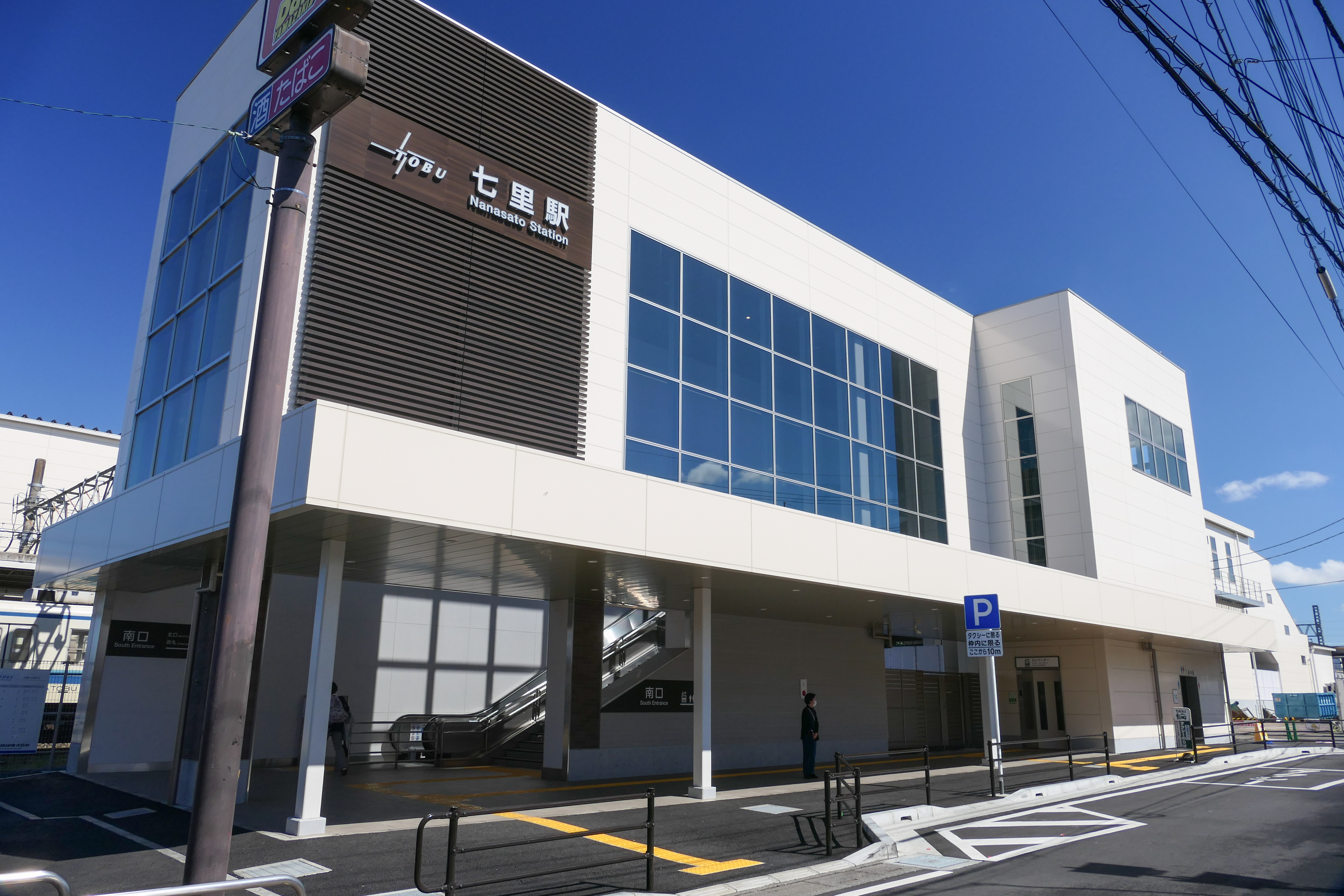
- Nanasato Station entrance in April 2024

General information
- Location: 603 Futtono, Minami-ku, Saitama-shi, Saitama-ken 337-0017; Japan
- Coordinates: 35.9367°N 139.6661°E
- Operator: Tōbu Railway
- Line: Tōbu Urban Park Line
- Distance: 5.6 km from Ōmiya
- Platforms: 2 side platforms
- Tracks: 2

Other information
- Station code: TD-05
- Website: Official website

History
- Opened: 17 November 1929; 96 years ago

Passengers
- FY2019: 20,392 daily

Services
| Preceding station | Tobu Railway | Following station |
|---|---|---|
| Ōwada TD04 towards Ōmiya | Tōbu Urban Park Line Local | Iwatsuki TD06 towards Funabashi |
Location
- Location within Saitama Prefecture Location within Japan

Nanasato Station (七里駅, Nanasato-eki) is a passenger railway station on the Tōbu Urban Park Line in Minuma-ku, Saitama, Saitama Prefecture, Japan, operated by the private railway operator Tōbu Railway.

== Lines ==
Nanasato Station is served by the 62.7 km (39.0 mi) Tōbu Urban Park Line from Ōmiya in Saitama Prefecture to Funabashi in Chiba Prefecture, and lies 5.6 km (3.5 mi) from the western terminus of the line at Ōmiya.

== Station layout ==
This station consists of two opposed side platforms serving two tracks, connected to the station building by a footbridge.

=== Platforms ===
| 1 | ■ Tōbu Urban Park Line | for Ōmiya |
| 2 | ■ Tōbu Urban Park Line | for Iwatsuki, Kasukabe, and Kashiwa |

== History ==
Nanasato Station opened on 17 November 1929.

From 17 March 2012, station numbering was introduced on all Tōbu lines, with Nanasato Station becoming "TD-05".

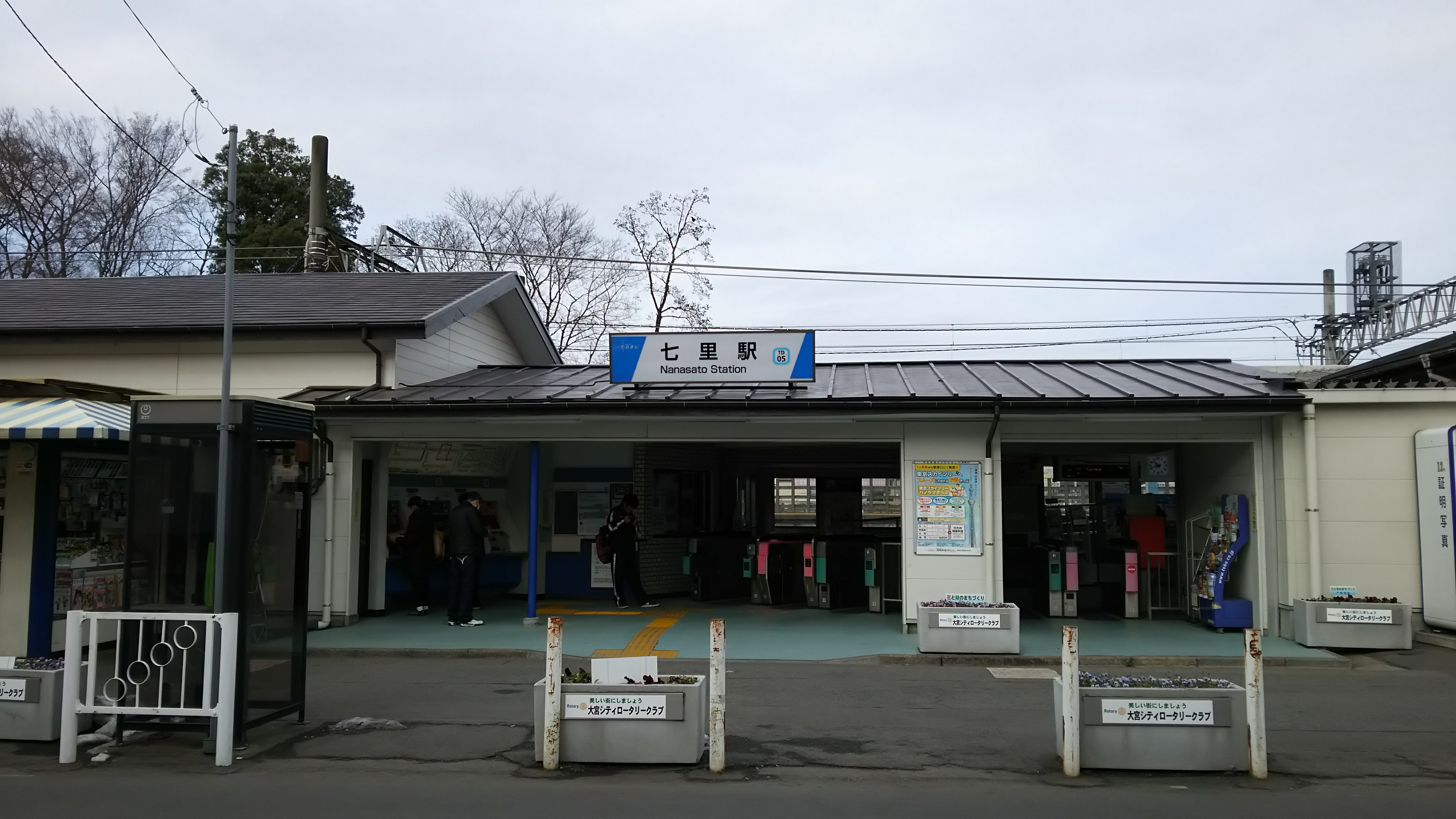
Nanasato Station in January 2016

In May 2021, as part of its fiscal 2021 investment plan, Tōbu Railway announced its plans to construct a new, elevated station building for Nanasato Station. The station's new building partially opened on 10 February 2024 and fully opened on 31 March of that year.

== Passenger statistics ==
In fiscal 2019, the station was used by an average of 20,392 passengers daily.

== Surrounding area ==
- Saitama City Minuma Ward Office

== See also ==
- List of railway stations in Japan
