= Yagisaki Station =

Railway station in Kasukabe, Saitama Prefecture, Japan

TD09 Yagisaki Station 八木崎駅
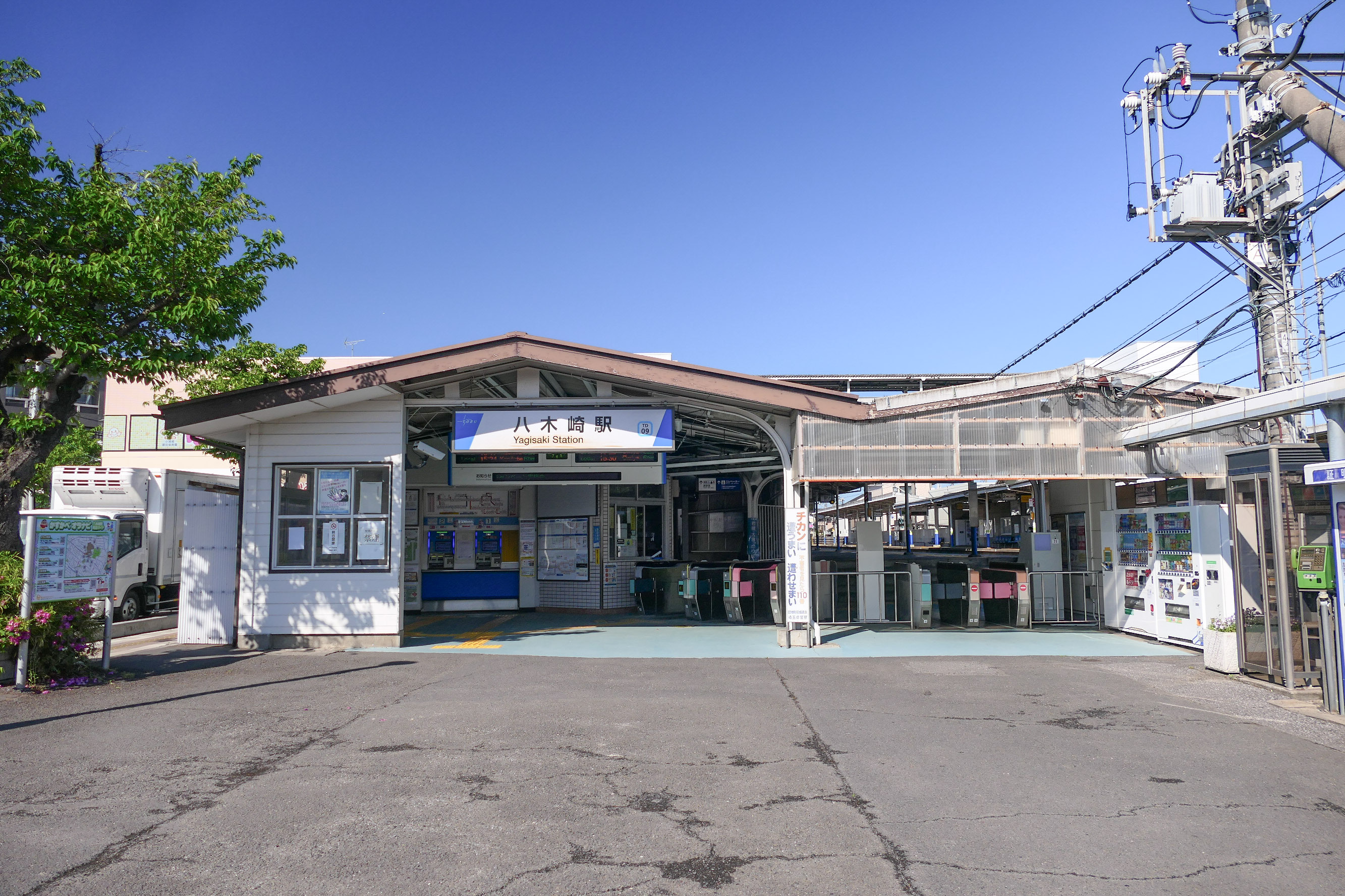
- Yagisaki Station in April 2025

General information
- Location: 6946 Kasukabe, Kasukabe-shi, Saitama-ken 344-0061; Japan
- Coordinates: 35°58′42.50″N 139°44′31.32″E
- Operator: Tōbu Railway
- Line: Tobu Urban Park Line
- Distance: 14.1 km from Ōmiya
- Platforms: 2 side platforms

Other information
- Station code: TD-09
- Website: Official website

History
- Opened: 17 November 1929; 96 years ago

Passengers
- FY2019: 10,646 daily

Services
Preceding station	Tobu Railway	Following station
Toyoharu TD08 towards Ōmiya	Urban Park Liner from Asakusa	Kasukabe One-way operation
Toyoharu TD08 towards Ōmiya	Tōbu Urban Park Line Local	Kasukabe TD10 towards Funabashi
Location
- Location within Saitama Prefecture Location within Japan

Yagisaki Station (八木崎駅, Yagisaki-eki) is a passenger railway station located in the city of Kasukabe, Saitama, Japan, operated by the private railway operator Tōbu Railway.

== Lines ==
Yagisaki Station is served by the 62.7 km (39.0 mi) Tobu Urban Park Line (formerly known as the "Tobu Noda Line") from Ōmiya in Saitama Prefecture to Funabashi in Chiba Prefecture, and lies 62.7 km (39.0 mi) from the western terminus of the line at Ōmiya.

== Station layout ==
The station consists of two ground-level opposing side platforms serving two tracks, connected to the station building by a footbridge.

=== Platforms ===
1	■ Tobu Urban Park Line	for Kasukabe and Kashiwa
3	■ Tobu Urban Park Line	for Iwatsuki and Ōmiya

== History ==
Yagisaki Station opened on 17 November 1929. From 17 March 2012, station numbering was introduced on all Tobu lines, with Yagisaki Station becoming "TD-09".

== Passenger statistics ==
In fiscal 2019, the station was used by an average of 10,646 passengers daily.

== Surrounding area ==
- Kasukabe Hashiman Jinja
