= Fujino-ushijima Station =

Railway station in Kasukabe, Saitama Prefecture, Japan

TD11 Fujino-ushijima Station 藤の牛島駅
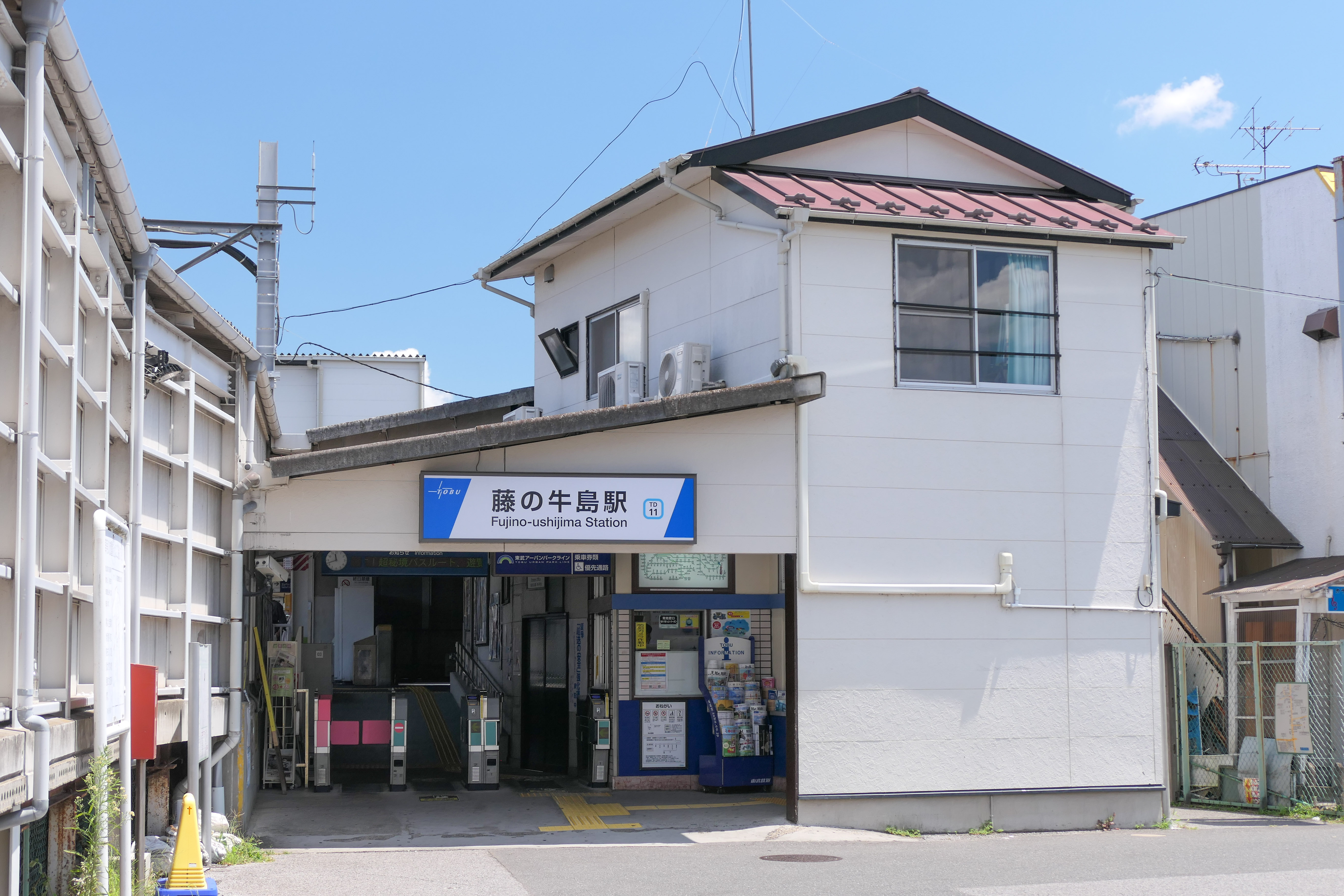
- Fujino-ushijima Station entrance in July 2021

General information
- Location: 1576 Ushijima, Kasukabe-shi, Saitama-ken 344-0004; Japan
- Coordinates: 35°58′49″N 139°46′40″E
- Operator: Tobu Railway
- Line: Tobu Urban Park Line
- Distance: 62.7 km from Ōmiya
- Platforms: 2 side platforms
- Tracks: 2

Other information
- Station code: TD-11
- Website: Official website

History
- Opened: 1 October 1930; 95 years ago
- Former names: Ushijima (until March 1931)

Passengers
- FY2019: 7,141 daily

Services
Preceding station	Tobu Railway	Following station
Kasukabe TD10 towards Ōmiya	Urban Park Liner	Minami-Sakurai TD12 towards Kashiwa
Kasukabe One-way operation	Urban Park Liner from Asakusa	Minami-Sakurai TD12 towards Kashiwa
Kasukabe TD10 towards Ōmiya	Tōbu Urban Park Line Express	Minami-Sakurai TD12 towards Funabashi
Kasukabe TD10 towards Ōmiya	Tōbu Urban Park Line Section Express	Minami-Sakurai TD12 towards Kashiwa
Kasukabe TD10 towards Ōmiya	Tōbu Urban Park Line Local	Minami-Sakurai TD12 towards Funabashi
Location
- Location within Saitama Prefecture Location within Japan

Fujino-ushijima Station (藤の牛島駅, Fujino-ushijima-eki) is a passenger railway station located in the city of Kasukabe, Saitama, Japan, operated by the private railway operator Tōbu Railway. The station is numbered "TD-11".

== Lines ==
Fujino-ushijima Station is served by the 62.7 km (39.0 mi) Tobu Urban Park Line (formerly known as the Tobu Noda Line) from Ōmiya in Saitama Prefecture to Funabashi in Chiba Prefecture, and lies 17.8 km (11.1 mi) from the western terminus of the line at Ōmiya.

== Station layout ==
The station consists of two ground-level opposing side platforms serving two tracks, connected to the station building by a footbridge.

=== Platforms ===
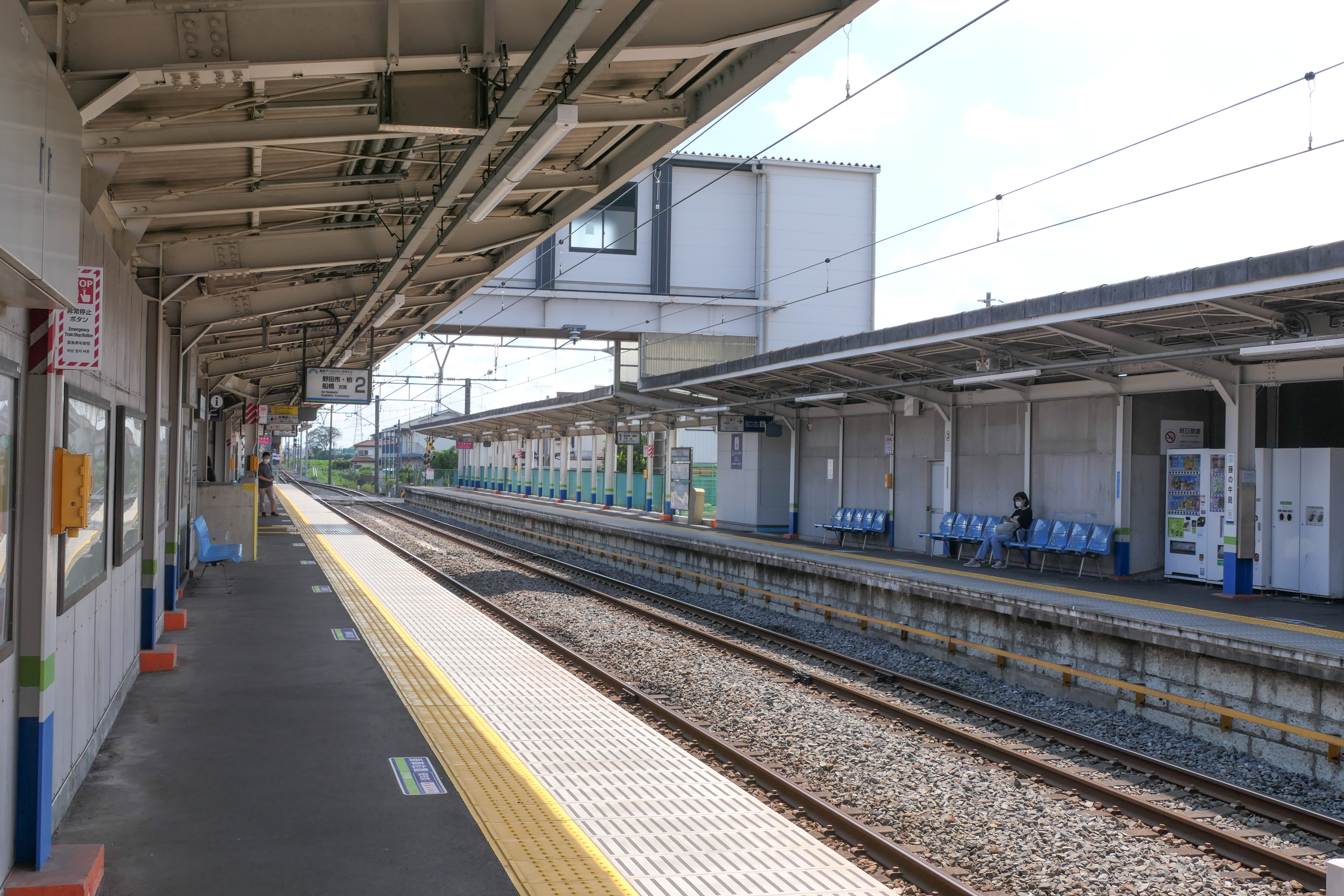
The station platforms in July 2021

1	■ Tobu Urban Park Line	for Kasukabe, Iwatsuki, and Ōmiya
2	■ Tobu Urban Park Line	for Nodashi, Kashiwa, and Funabashi

== History ==
The station opened on 1 October 1930 as Ushijima Station (牛島駅). It was renamed Fujino-ushima on 5 March 1931.

From 17 March 2012, station numbering was introduced on all Tobu lines, with Fujino-ushijima Station becoming "TD-11".

== Passenger statistics ==
In fiscal 2019, the station was used by an average of 7,141 passengers daily.

== Surrounding area ==
- Ushijima Wisteria (Special National Natural Monument)
- Kasukabe – Ushijima Post Office

== See also ==
- List of railway stations in Japan
