= Ichinowari Station =

Railway station in Kasukabe, Saitama Prefecture, Japan

TS26 Ichinowari Station 一ノ割駅
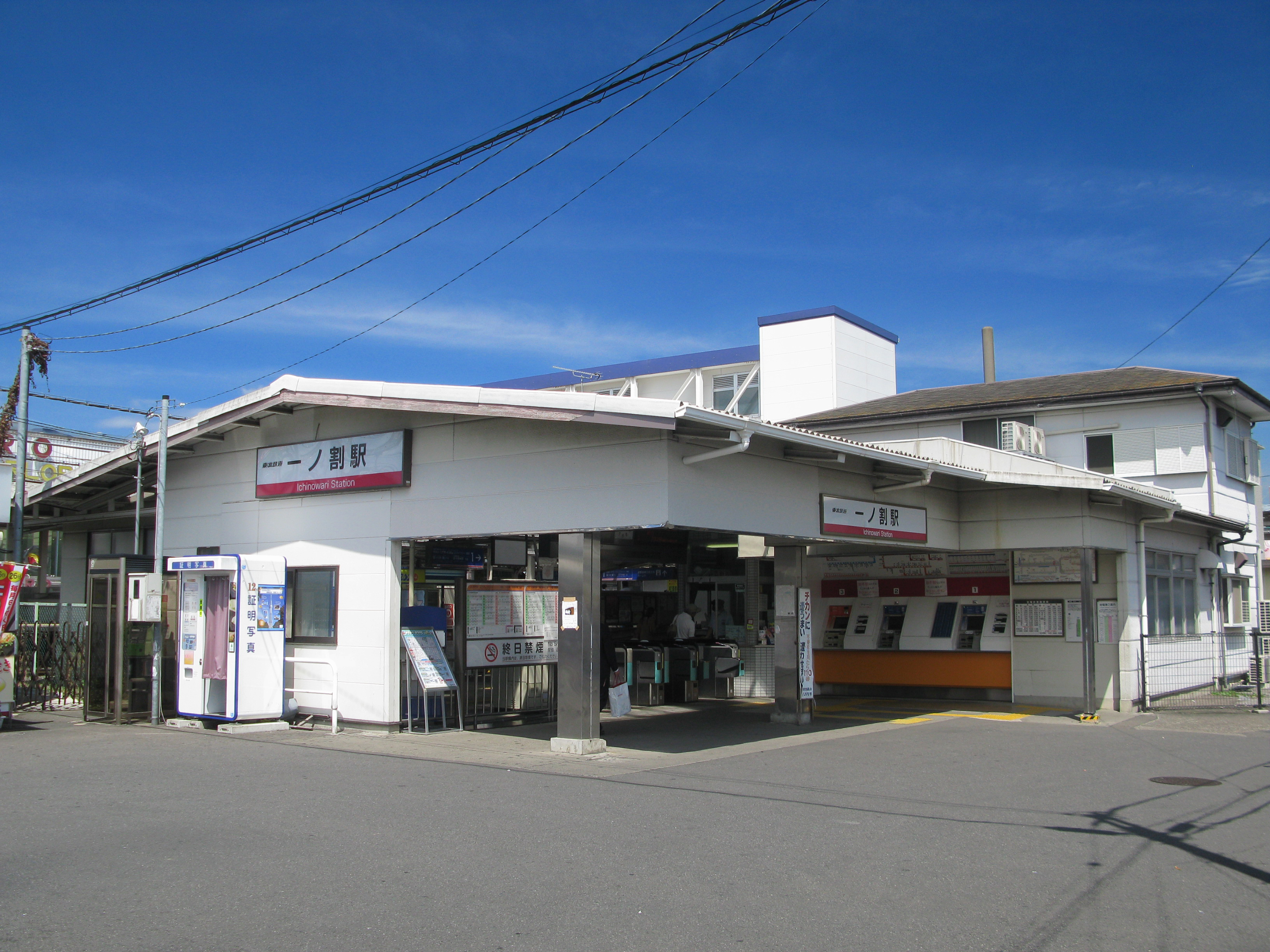
- Ichinowari Station, August 2012

General information
- Location: 1-1-1 Ichinowari, Kasukabe City, Saitama Prefecture 344-0031; Japan
- Coordinates: 35.9640°N 139.7661°E
- Operator: Tōbu Railway
- Line: Tōbu Skytree Line
- Distance: 33.0 km (20.5 mi) from Asakusa
- Platforms: 2 side platforms
- Tracks: 2

Other information
- Station code: TS-26
- Website: Official website

History
- Opened: 1 October 1926; 99 years ago

Passengers
- FY2024: 8,238 daily boardings

Services
Preceding station	Tobu Railway	Following station
Takesato TS25 towards Oshiage	Tobu Skytree Line Semi Express	Kasukabe TS27 towards Tōbu-Dōbutsu-Kōen
Takesato TS25 towards Asakusa	Tobu Skytree Line Section Semi Express Local	Kasukabe TS27 towards Tōbu-Dōbutsu-Kōen
Location
- Location within Saitama Prefecture Location within Japan

Ichinowari Station (一ノ割駅, Ichinowari-eki) is a passenger railway station located in the city of Kasukabe, Saitama, Japan, operated by the private railway operator Tōbu Railway.

== Line ==
The station is served by the Tōbu Skytree Line, and is 33.0 kilometers from the terminus of the line at Asakusa Station.

== Station layout ==
The station has two opposed side platforms serving two tracks, connected to the station building by a footbridge.

=== Platforms ===
1	Tōbu Skytree Line	for Shin-Koshigaya, Kita-Senju, and Asakusa; Tokyo Metro Hanzomon Line for Shibuya; Tokyu Den-en-toshi Line for Chūō-rinkan; Tokyo Metro Hibiya Line for Ueno and Naka-meguro
2	Tōbu Skytree Line	for Kasukabe and Tōbu-Dōbutsu-Kōen; Tobu Isesaki Line for Kuki; Tōbu Nikkō Line for Minami-Kurihashi

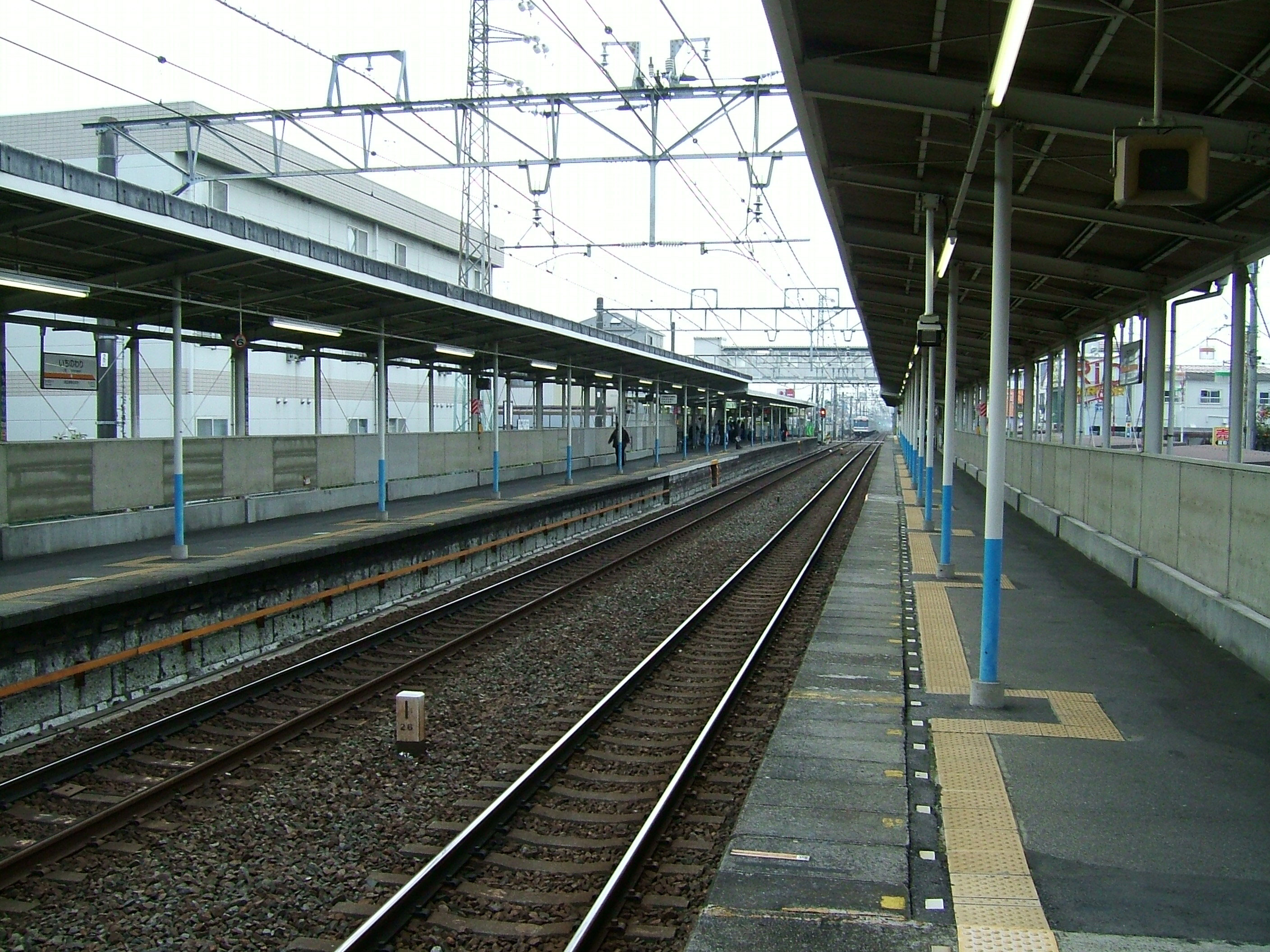
Station platforms, November 2008

== History ==
Ichinowari Station opened on 1 October 1926. From 17 March 2012, station numbering was introduced on all Tōbu lines, with Ichinowari Station becoming "TS-26".

== Passenger statistics ==
In fiscal 2024, the station was used by an average of 8,238 passengers daily (boarding passengers only).

== Surrounding area ==
- Kasukabe Chuo General Hospital
