= Higashi-Iwatsuki Station =

Railway station in Saitama, Japan

TD07 Higashi-Iwatsuki Station 東岩槻駅
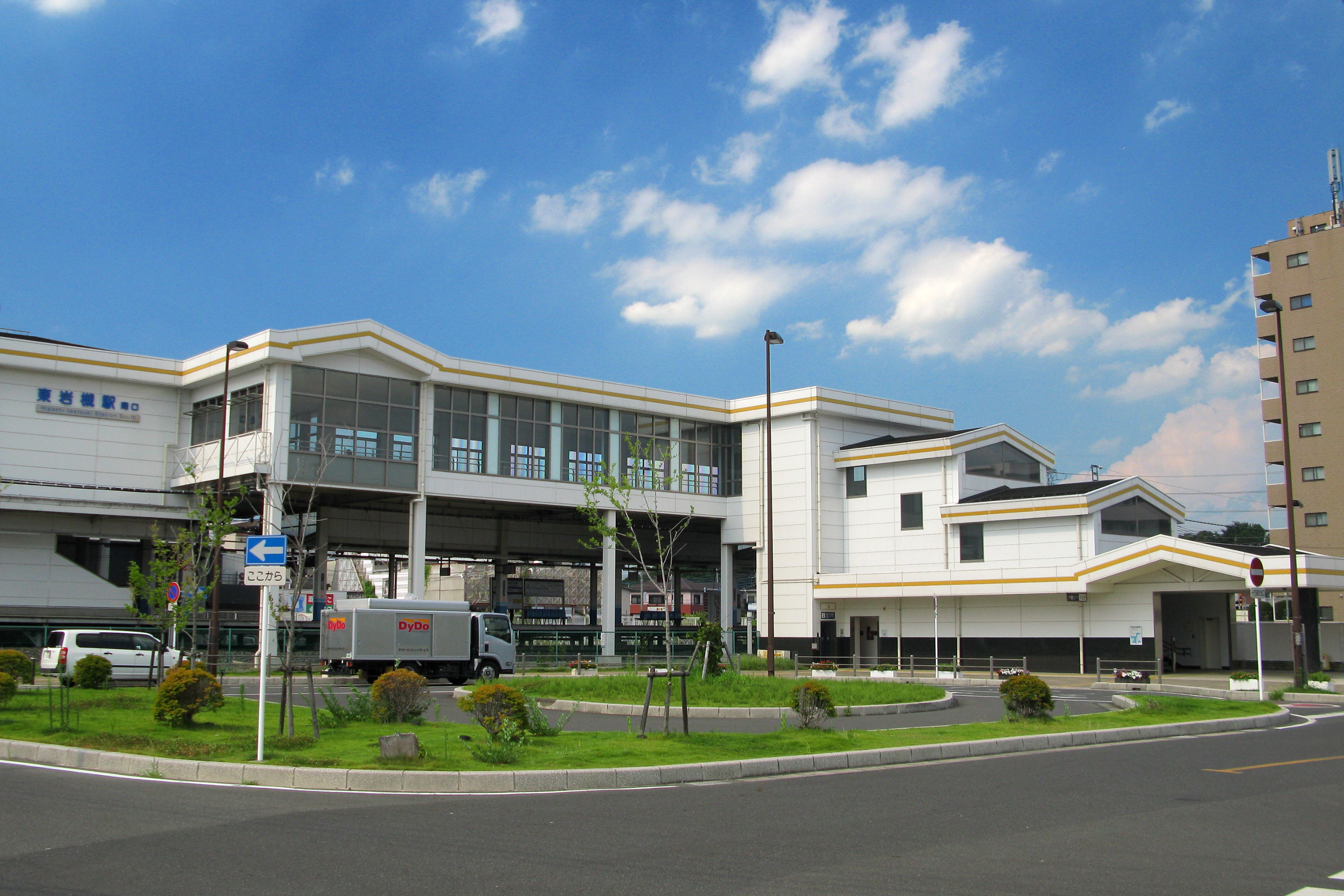
- South side of Higashi-Iwatsuki Station, August 2012

General information
- Location: 1-12-1 Higashi-Iwatsuki, Iwatsuki-ku, Saitama-shi, Saitama-ken; Japan
- Coordinates: 35.9635°N 139.7124°E
- Operator: Tōbu Railway
- Line: Tobu Urban Park Line
- Distance: 10.9 km from Ōmiya
- Platforms: 1 island platform

Other information
- Station code: TD-07
- Website: Official website

History
- Opened: 17 November 1929; 96 years ago

Passengers
- FY2019: 20,454 daily

Services
Preceding station	Tobu Railway	Following station
Iwatsuki TD06 towards Ōmiya	Urban Park Liner from Asakusa	Toyoharu One-way operation
Iwatsuki TD06 towards Ōmiya	Tōbu Urban Park Line Local	Toyoharu TD08 towards Funabashi
Location
- Location within Saitama city Location within Saitama Prefecture Location within Japan

Higashi-Iwatsuki Station (東岩槻駅, Higashi-Iwatsuki-eki) is a passenger railway station located in Iwatsuki-ku, Saitama, Japan, operated by the private railway operator Tōbu Railway. The station is numbered "TD-07".

== Lines ==
Higashi-Iwatsuki Station is served by the 62.7 km (39.0 mi) Tōbu Urban Park Line (formerly known as the Tōbu Noda Line) from Ōmiya in Saitama Prefecture to Funabashi in Chiba Prefecture, and lies 10.9 km (6.8 mi) from the western terminus of the line at Ōmiya.

== Station layout ==
The station has one ground-level island platform serving two tracks. The station building is located above the platform.

=== Platforms ===
1	■ Tōbu Urban Park Line	for Ōmiya
2	■ Tōbu Urban Park Line	for Kashiwa and Funabashi

== History ==
The station opened on 1 December 1969. The present station building was completed in 2006. From 17 March 2012, station numbering was introduced on the Tōbu Noda Line, with Higashi-Iwatsuki Station becoming "TD-07".

== Passenger statistics ==
In fiscal 2019, the station was used by an average of 20,454 passengers daily.

== Surrounding area ==
- Site of Iwatsuki Castle
- Higashi-Iwatsuki Post Office
- Kaichi Gakuen

== See also ==
- List of railway stations in Japan
