= Minuma-ku =

Minuma-ku, Saitama 見沼区
- Ward
- Mimuma Ward
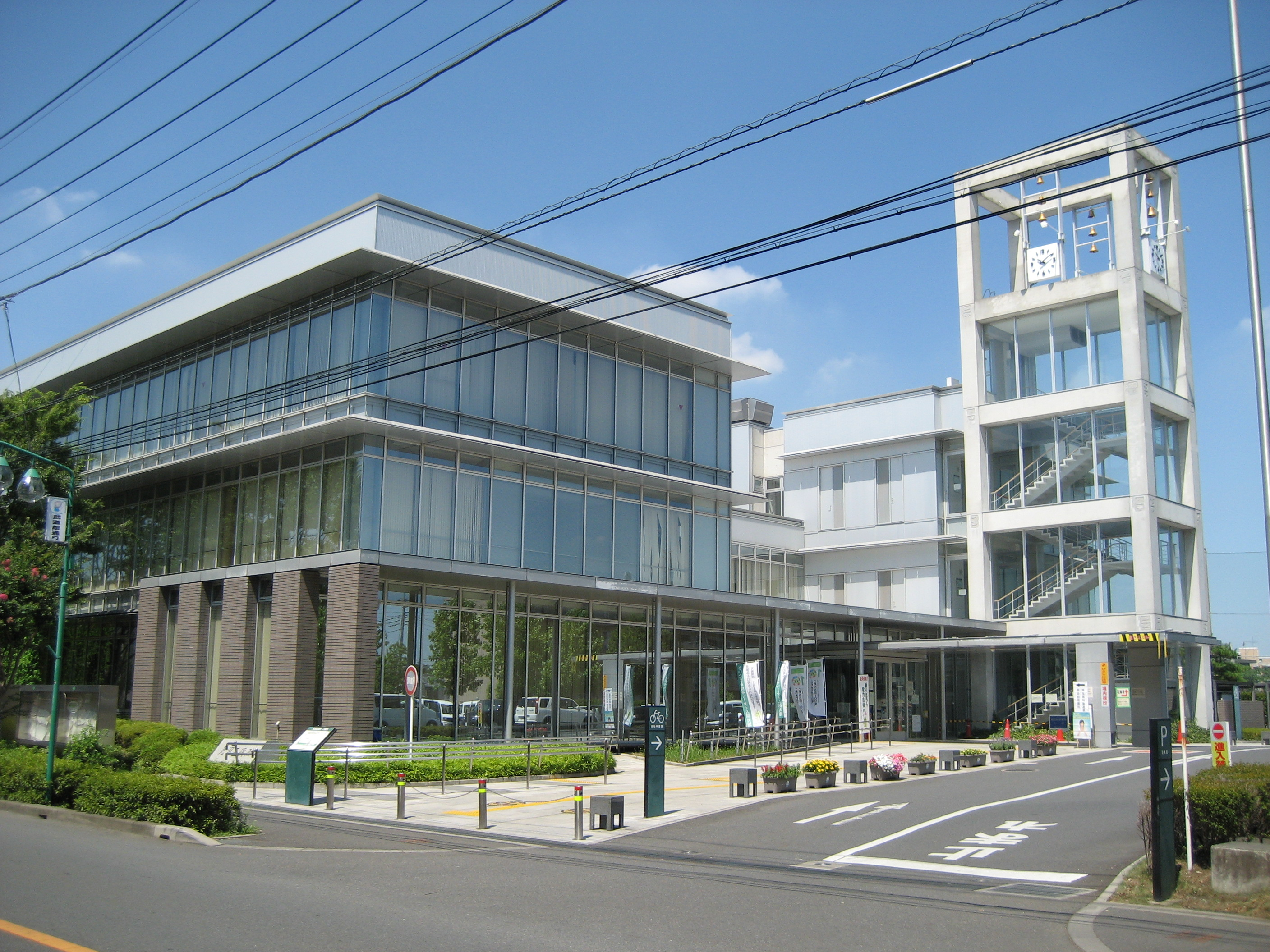
- Minuma Ward Office, Saitama City

- Seal

- Location of Minuma-ku in Saitama

- Coordinates: 35°56′6.7″N 139°39′15.7″E
- Country: Japan
- Region: Kantō
- Prefecture: Saitama
- City: Saitama

Area
  - Total: 30.69 km^{2} (11.85 sq mi)

Population (March 2021)
  - Total: 163,869
  - Density: 5,339/km^{2} (13,830/sq mi)
- Time zone: UTC+9 (Japan Standard Time)
- -Flower: Cypripedium japonicum
- Phone number: 048-687-1111
- Address: 12-36 Horisaki-cho, Minuma-ku, Saitama-shi, Saitama-ken 337-8586
- Website: Official website

Minuma-ku (見沼区, Minuma-ku) is one of ten wards of the city of Saitama, in Saitama Prefecture, Japan, and is located in the northern part of the city. As of 1 March 2021, the ward had an estimated population of 163,869 and a population density of 5300 persons per km^{2}. Its total area was 29.14 square kilometres (11.25 sq mi).

== Geography ==
Mimuna-ward is located in the northern side of the city of Saitama.

=== Neighboring Municipalities ===
Saitama Prefecture

- Iwatsuki-ku
- Midori-ku
- Urawa-ku
- Kita-ku
- Ōmiya-ku
- Ageo
- Hasuda

== History ==
The villages of Katayanagi and Ōsato were created within Kitaadachi District, Saitama with the establishment of the municipalities system on April 1, 1889. The village of Haruoka was created in 1892 and the village of Nanasato in 1912. On November 3, 1930, the village of Ōsato was merged with Ōmiya Town in 1940, becoming part of the city of Ōmiya. On January 1, 1955, Ōmiya annexed Katayanagi, Haruoka, and Nanasato. On May 1, 2001, Ōmiya merged with Urawa and Yono cities to form the new city of Saitama. When Saitama was proclaimed a designated city in 2003, this area of former Ōmiya city became Minuma Ward.

== Education ==
- Shibaura Institute of Technology
- Minuma-ku has eleven elementary schools, seven junior high schools, and three high schools.

Municipal junior high schools:

- Haruno (春野中学校)
- Harusato (春里中学校)
- Katayanagi (片柳中学校)
- Nanasato (七里中学校)
- Omiya Yahata (大宮八幡中学校)
- Osato (大砂土中学校)
- Oya (大谷中学校)

Municipal elementary schools:

- Ebinuma (海老沼小学校)
- Haruno (春野小学校)
- Haruoka (春岡小学校)
- Hasunuma (蓮沼小学校)
- Higashi Miyashita (東宮下小学校)
- Katayanagi (片柳小学校)
- Minuma (見沼小学校)
- Nanasato (七里小学校)
- Osato Higashi (大砂土東小学校)
- Oya (大谷小学校)
- Shima (島小学校)

== Transportation ==
=== Railway ===
JR East – Utsunomiya Line

- Higashi-Ōmiya

Tōbu Railway - Tōbu Urban Park Line

- Ōwada - Nanasato

=== Highway ===
- Shuto Expressway Saitama Shintoshin Route
- National Route 16

== Local attractions ==
- Minumatanbo (見沼田んぼ), referring to a vast green area of nearly 1260 hectares left within 20 to 30 kilometers from central Tokyo.
