= Kasukabe =

Kasukabe 春日部市
- Special city
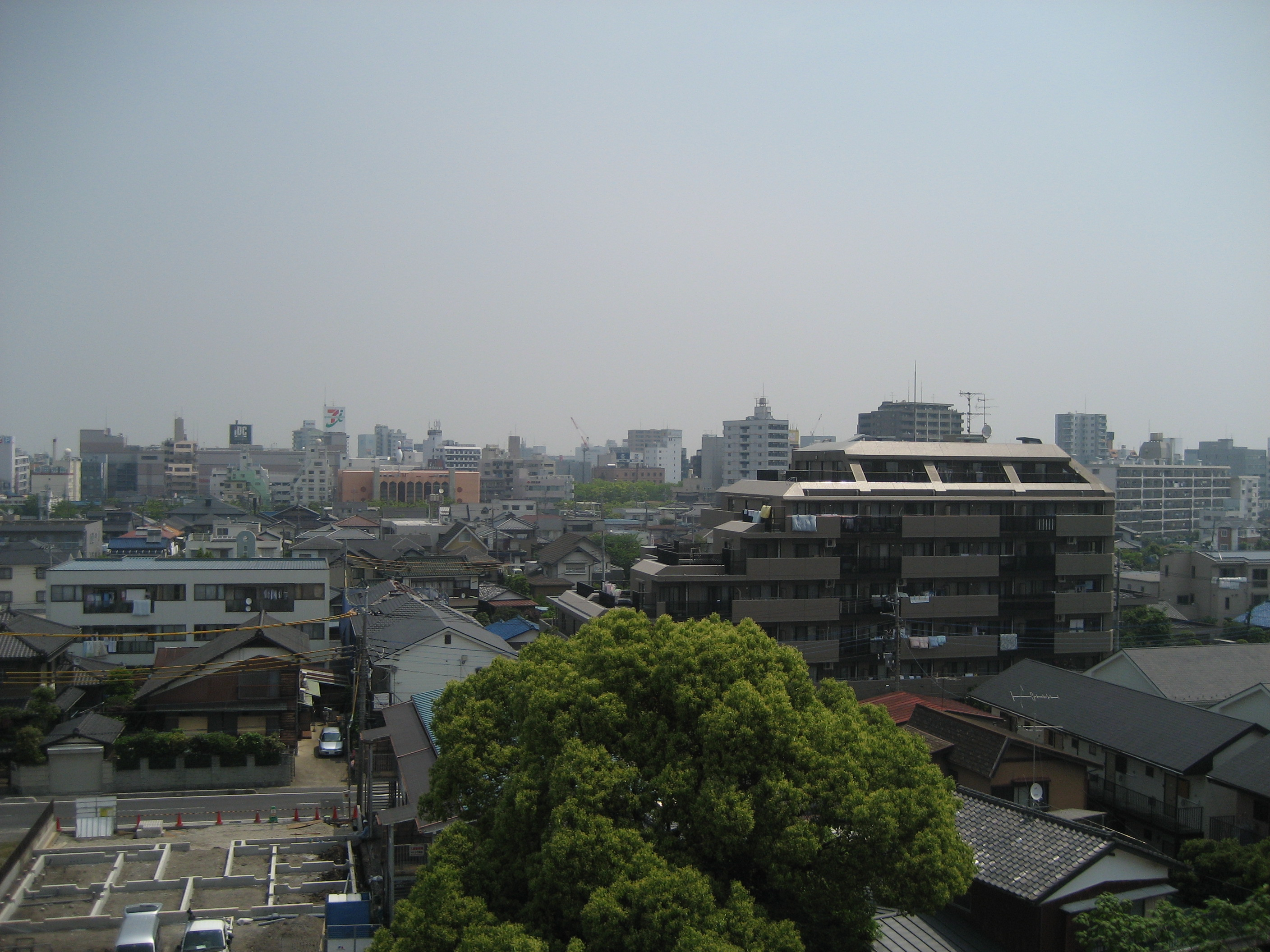
- View of central Kasukabe

- Flag Seal

- Location of Kasukabe in Saitama Prefecture

- Location within Japan
- Coordinates: 35°58′30.9″N 139°45′8.2″E
- Country: Japan
- Region: Kantō
- Prefecture: Saitama

Government
  - Mayor: Kazuhiro Iwaya (from November 2021)

Area
  - Total: 66.00 km^{2} (25.48 sq mi)

Population (February 2021)
  - Total: 233,278
  - Density: 3,535/km^{2} (9,154/sq mi)
- Time zone: UTC+9 (Japan Standard Time)
- Tree: Paulownia tomentosa
- Flower: Wisteria
- Bird: Black-headed gull
- Phone number: 048-736-1111
- Address: 7-2-1 Chuo, Kasukabe-shi, Saitama-ken 344-8577
- Website: Official website

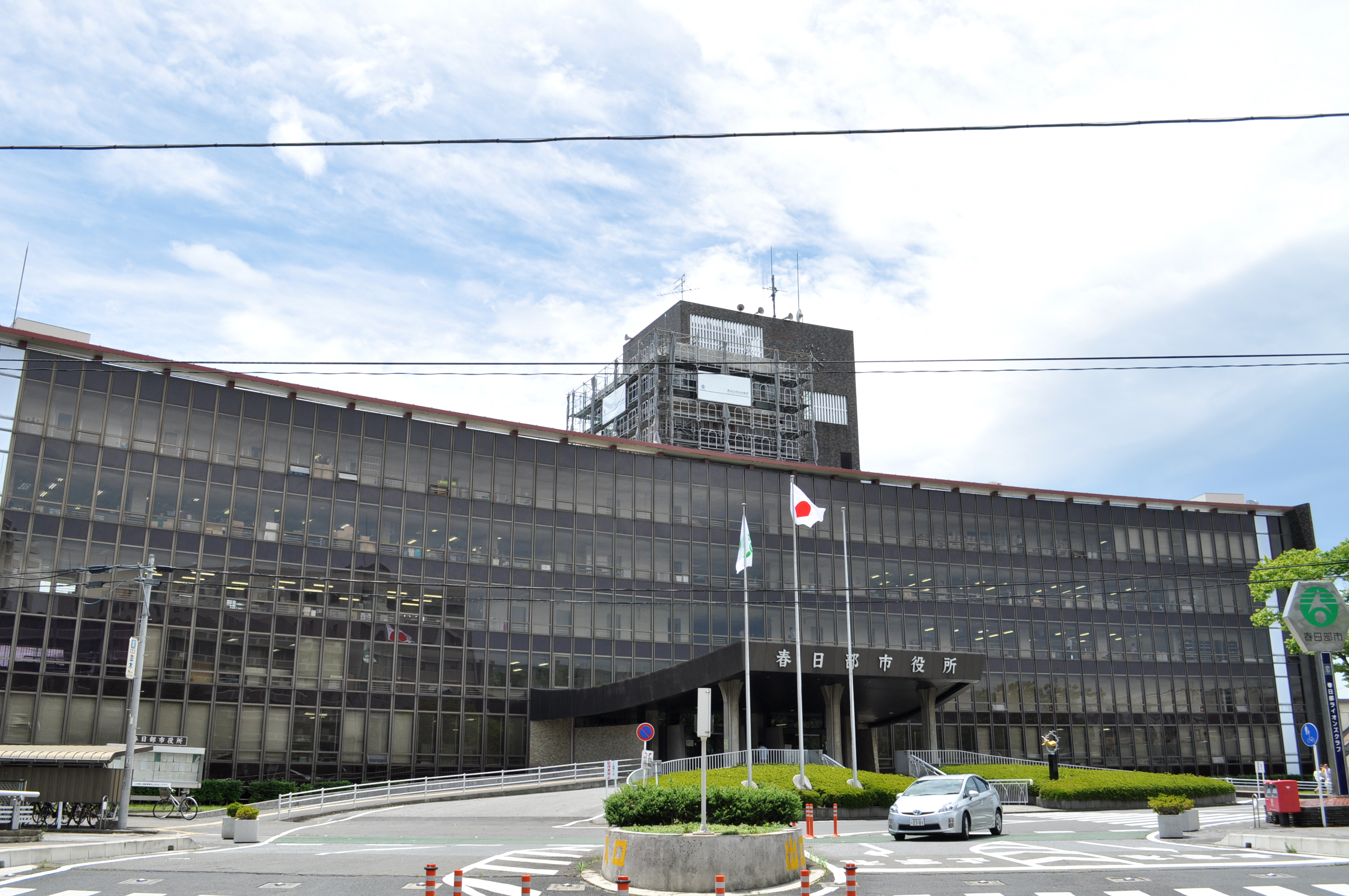
Kasukabe City Hall

Kasukabe (春日部市, Kasukabe-shi) is a city located in Saitama Prefecture, Japan. It was one of the special cities of Japan until their abolition in 2015. As of 1 February 2021, the city had an estimated population of 233,278 in 108,328 households and a population density of 3,500 inhabitants per square kilometre (9,100/sq mi). The total area of the city is 66.00 square kilometres (25.48 sq mi). Kasukabe is famous for the production of kiri-tansu (桐箪笥), traditional tansu dressers made from paulownia wood. The cultural and economic value of the paulownia is reflected in its designation as the official town tree.

== Geography ==
Kasukabe is located in far eastern Saitama Prefecture, divided between the Shimosa Plateau and the Omiya Plateau by the Nakagawa lowlands and the Edogawa River. The eastern portion of the city is still rural, with the largest area of paddy fields in Saitama.

=== Surrounding municipalities ===
- Chiba Prefecture
  - Noda
- Saitama Prefecture
  - Koshigaya
  - Matsubushi
  - Miyashiro
  - Saitama (Iwatsuki-ku)
  - Shiraoka
  - Sugito

=== Climate ===
Kasukabe has a humid subtropical climate (Köppen Cfa) characterized by warm summers and cool winters with light to no snowfall. The average annual temperature in Kasukabe is 14.5 °C (58.1 °F). The average annual rainfall is 1,408 millimetres (55.4 in) with September as the wettest month. The temperatures are highest on average in August, at around 26.3 °C (79.3 °F), and lowest in January, at around 2.8 °C (37.0 °F).

== Demographics ==
Per Japanese census data, the population of Kasukabe peaked around the year 2000 and has declined slightly since.

Historical population
Year	Pop.	±%
1960	50,088	—
1970	103,828	+107.3%
1980	187,913	+81.0%
1990	226,449	+20.5%
2000	240,924	+6.4%
2010	237,171	−1.6%
2020	229,792	−3.1%

== History ==
The area of Kasukabe was part of ancient Musashi Province and has been settled since at least the Jomon period as evidenced by many shell middens and ancient burial mounds. During the Edo period, Kasukabe prospered as a post station on the Nikkō Kaidō highway linking Edo with Nikkō.

The town of Kasukabe was created within Minamisaitama District, Saitama with the establishment of the modern municipalities system on April 1, 1889. On April 1, 1944, Kasukabe annexed the neighboring village of Uchimaki. On July 1, 1954, Kasukabe was elevated to city status after annexing the villages of Toyoharu, Takesato, Komatsu and Toyono. On October 1, 2005, old Kasukabe city and the town of Shōwa (from Kitakatsushika District) were merged into the new and expanded city of Kasukabe. Kasukabe was elevated to special city status on April 1, 2008, giving it increased local autonomy.

== Government ==
Kasukabe has a mayor-council form of government with a directly elected mayor and a unicameral city council of 32 members. Kasukabe contributes three members to the Saitama Prefectural Assembly. In terms of national politics, the city is part of Saitama 16th district of the lower house of the Diet of Japan.

== Economy ==
Kasukabe is a regional commercial center with a mixed economy.

== Education ==
- Kyoei University
- Kasukabe has 22 public elementary schools and 11 public middle schools operated by the city government, and five public high schools operated by the Saitama Prefectural Board of Education, including the Saitama Prefectural Kasukabe High School and Kasukabe Girls' Senior High School. In addition, there is one private combined middle/high school. The prefecture also operates one special education school for the disabled.

== Transportation ==
=== Railway ===
Tōbu Railway - Tobu Skytree Line

- Takesato - Ichinowari - Kasukabe - Kita-Kasukabe

Tōbu Railway - Tobu Urban Park Line

- Toyoharu - Yagisaki - Kasukabe - Fujino-ushijima - Minami-Sakurai

=== Highway ===
- National Route 4
- National Route 16

== Sister cities ==
- Pasadena, California, United States, friendship city since July 3, 1993. Pasadena's Junior Chamber of Commerce does an exchange program each summer, alternating every year with Kasukabe residents going to Pasadena one summer and Pasadena residents coming to Kasukabe the next summer.
- Fraser Coast Region, Queensland, Australia, friendship city since April 29, 2007

== Local attractions ==
- Kasukabe Hachiman-gu
- Metropolitan Area Outer Underground Discharge Channel has a public entrance in Kasukabe. Also known as G-CANs, this huge underground flood control system was completed in 2009. The monumental main storage chamber, sometimes called the "underground temple", has been the setting for TV shows and commercials. It is open to tours.
- Ushijima Wisteria
- Uchiaki Park

=== Commerce ===
Close to the west entrance to the station is a shopping mall, known as Lala Garden, housing several chain retail stores as well as a supermarket, 100-yen shop, and more.

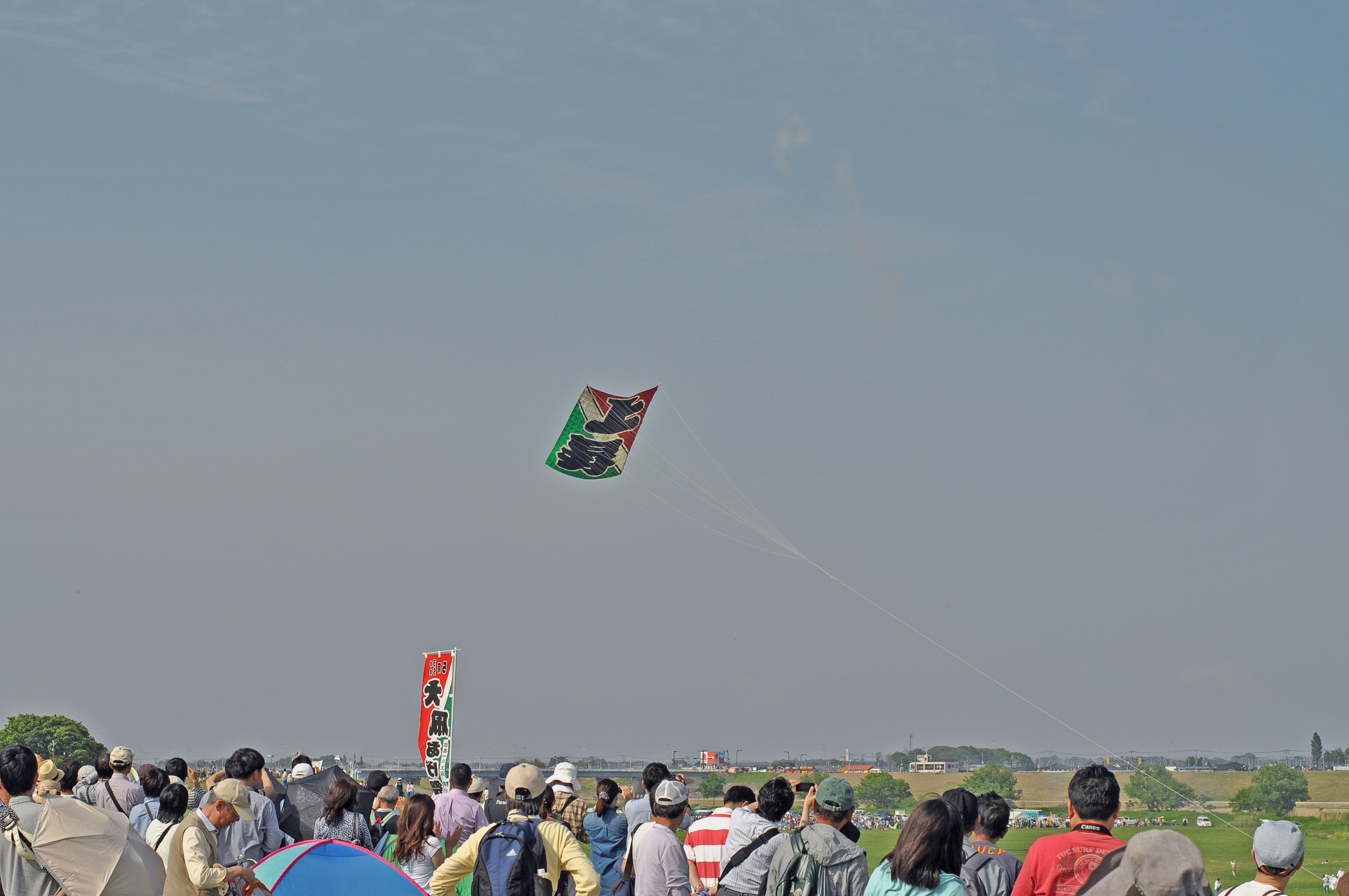
Kasukabe Kite Festival on May

In March 2013, an Aeon mall opened on National Route 16, which shoppers can either reach by car, or by taking a regularly scheduled bus from the east entrance of the station. This mall, as well as Lala Garden, has a movie theatre.

== In popular culture ==
Kasukabe is the setting of the manga and anime series Lucky Star and Crayon Shin-chan.

=== Crayon Shin-chan ===
External image
- Crayon Shin-chan Strolling Map by Kasukabe City Government

The early manga volumes and anime seasons of the popular anime series "Crayon Shin-chan" take place in Kasukabe. Many locations from the anime, like department stores and supermarkets, are based on real places in Kasukabe. The creator of Crayon Shin-chan, Yoshito Usui, also lived in Kasukabe. He was inspired by his own childhood in Kasukabe, and many familiar locations in the show are based on real places. Kasukabe is a popular tourist destination for fans of Crayon Shin-chan, with attractions based on the anime and manga.
