= Matsubushi =

Matsubushi 松伏町
- Town
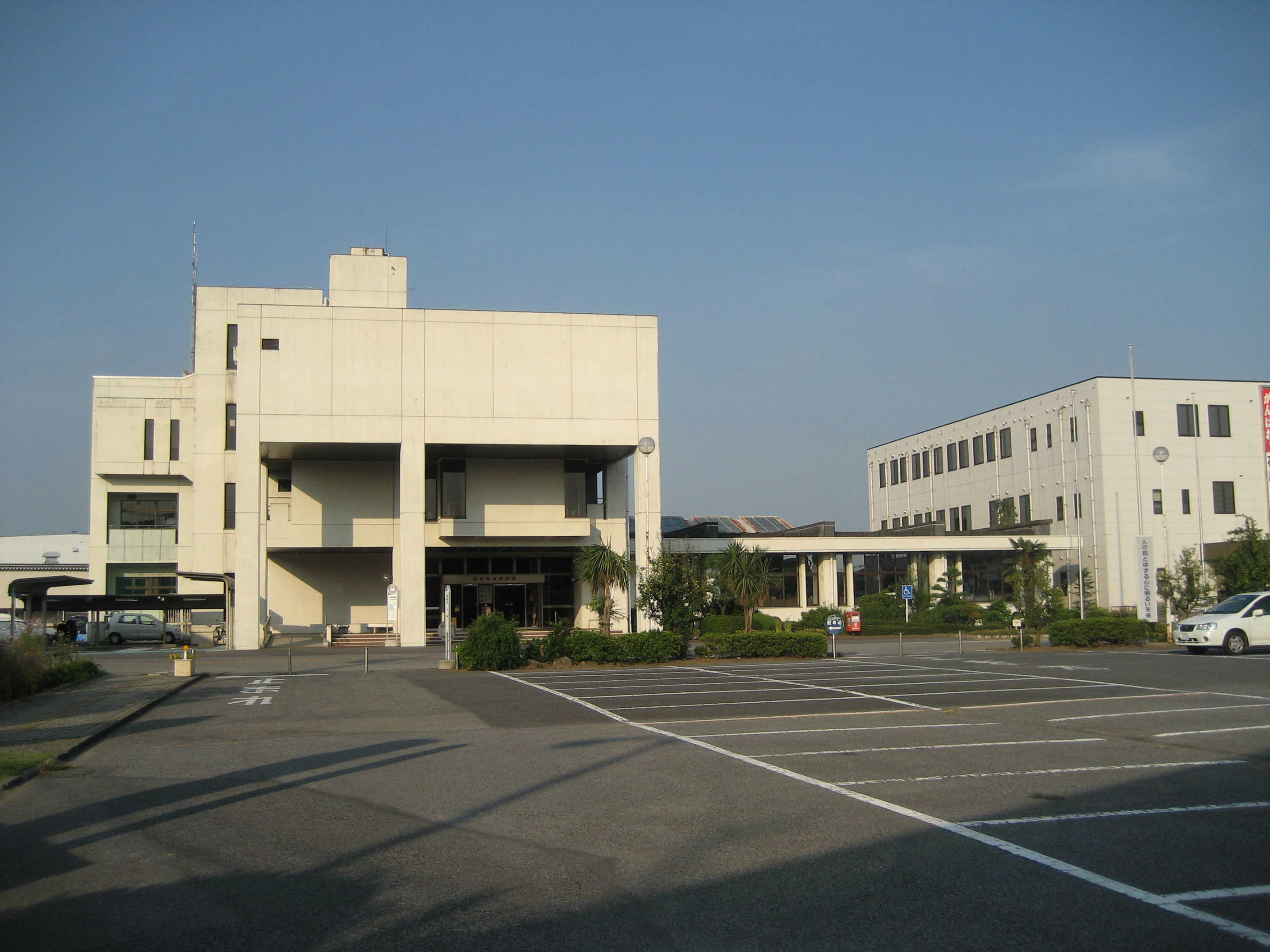
- Matsubushi town hall

- Flag Seal

- Location of Matsubushi in Saitama Prefecture

- Coordinates: 35°55′32.8″N 139°48′54.6″E
- Country: Japan
- Region: Kantō
- Prefecture: Saitama
- District: Kitakatsushika

Area
  - Total: 16.20 km^{2} (6.25 sq mi)

Population (February 1, 2021)
  - Total: 28,787
  - Density: 1,777/km^{2} (4,602/sq mi)
- Time zone: UTC+9 (Japan Standard Time)
- Tree: Pine
- Flower: Chrysanthemum
- Phone number: 048-991-2711
- Address: 2424 Matsuboshi, Matsubushi-machi, Kitakatsushika-gun, Saitama Prefecture, Japan 343-0192
- Website: Official website

Matsubushi (松伏町, Matsubushi-machi) is a town located in Saitama Prefecture, Japan. As of 1 March 2021, the town had an estimated population of 28,787 in 12,141 households and a population density of 1800 persons per km^{2}. The total area of the town is 16.20 square kilometres (6.25 sq mi).

== Geography ==
Located in the Shimōsa Plateau of far eastern Saitama Prefecture, Matsubushi is on the central reaches of the Edogawa River and borders upon Chiba Prefecture to the east.

=== Surrounding municipalities ===
- Chiba Prefecture
  - Noda
- Saitama Prefecture
  - Kasukabe
  - Koshigaya
  - Yoshikawa

=== Climate ===
Matsubushi has a humid subtropical climate (Köppen Cfa) characterized by warm summers and cool winters with light to no snowfall. The average annual temperature in Matsubushi is 14.7 °C. The average annual rainfall is 1408 mm with September as the wettest month. The temperatures are highest on average in August, at around 26.4 °C, and lowest in January, at around 3.1 °C.

== Demographics ==
Per Japanese census data, the population of Matsubushi has recently plateaued after several decades of growth.

Historical population
| Year | Pop. | ±% |
|---|---|---|
| 1920 | 6,741 | — |
| 1930 | 6,911 | +2.5% |
| 1940 | 7,362 | +6.5% |
| 1950 | 8,880 | +20.6% |
| 1960 | 8,844 | −0.4% |
| 1970 | 12,207 | +38.0% |
| 1980 | 18,462 | +51.2% |
| 1990 | 24,194 | +31.0% |
| 2000 | 29,021 | +20.0% |
| 2010 | 31,153 | +7.3% |
| 2020 | 28,266 | −9.3% |

== History ==
The area of Matsubushi was part of Shimōsa Province prior to the Meiji period, and was transferred to the newly created Saitama Prefecture in 1871. The village of Matsubushiryo was created within Kitakatsushika District, Saitama with the establishment of the municipalities system on April 1, 1889. It was renamed Matsubushi on April 1, 1956, and elevated to town status on April 1, 1969.

== Government ==
Matsubushi has a mayor-council form of government with a directly elected mayor and a unicameral town council of 15 members. Matsubushi contributes one member to the Saitama Prefectural Assembly. In terms of national politics, the town is part of Saitama 14th district of the lower house of the Diet of Japan.

== Economy ==
Matsubushi was formerly a center of rice production, but farmland is giving way to urbanization. The town now produces eggs, hakusai Chinese cabbage and negi, the Japanese welsh onion. The town is home to the Matsubushi Campus of Taisho University.

== Education ==
Matsubushi has three public elementary schools and two public middle schools operated by the city government, and one public high school operated by the Saitama Prefectural Board of Education. Taisho University has a campus in Matsubushi.

== Transportation ==
=== Railway ===
Matsubushi is not served by any passenger rail service.

=== Highway ===
- National Route 4

== Noted people from Matsubushi ==
- Ryo Ishikawa, professional golfer
- Hiroko Hatano, model and actress
