= Iwatsuki-ku =

Iwatsuki-ku, Saitama 岩槻区
- Ward
- Iwatsuki Ward
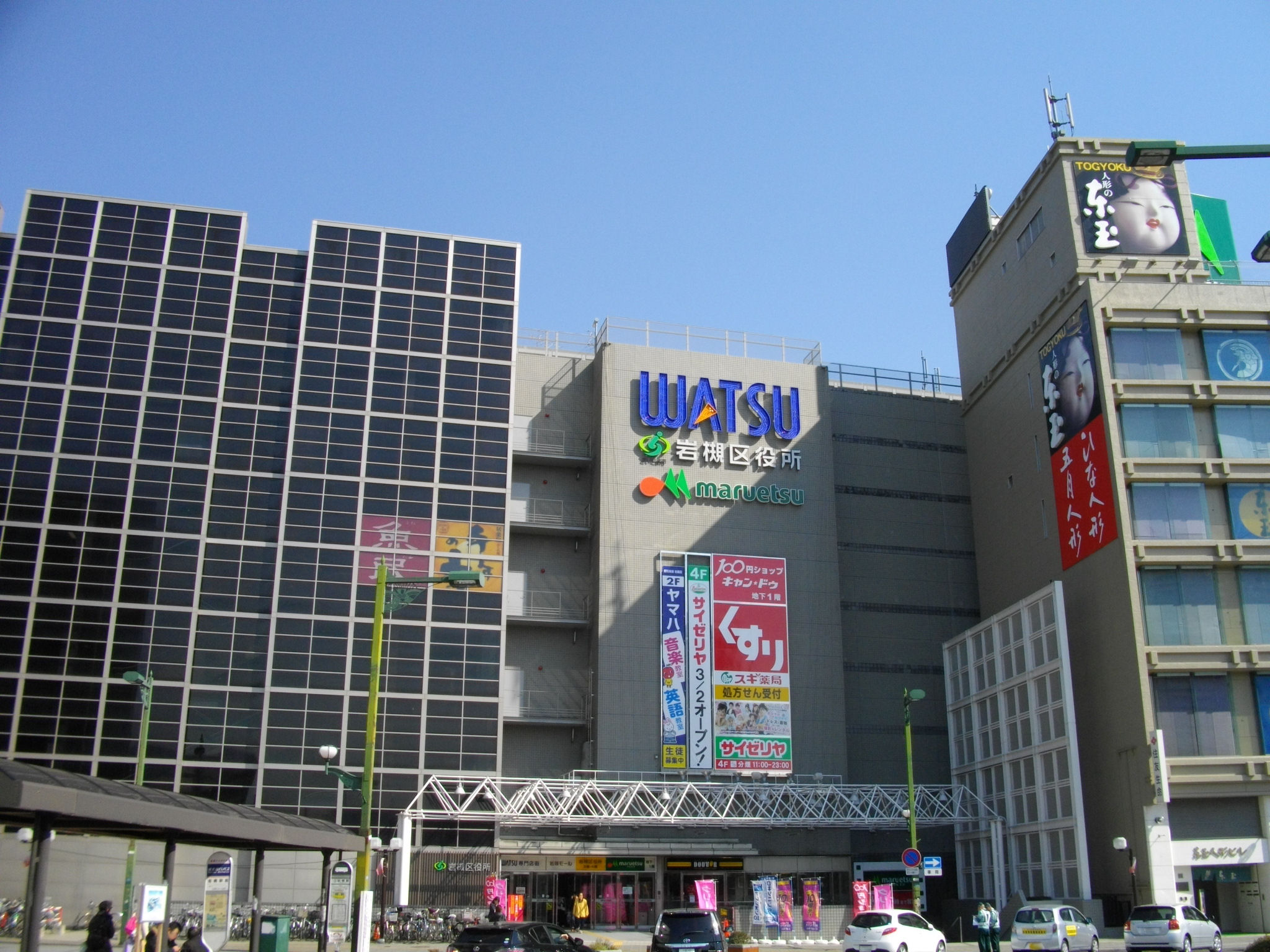
- Iwatsuki Watsu shopping center, Saitama City

- Seal

- Location of Iwatsuki-ku in Saitama

- Coordinates: 35°56′59.9″N 139°41′39.5″E
- Country: Japan
- Region: Kantō
- Prefecture: Saitama
- City: Saitama

Area
  - Total: 49.17 km^{2} (18.98 sq mi)

Population (March 2021)
  - Total: 112,862
  - Density: 2,295/km^{2} (5,945/sq mi)
- Time zone: UTC+9 (Japan Standard Time)
- -Flower: Kerria japonica
- Phone number: 048-835-3156
- Address: 3-2-5 Honcho, Iwatsuki-ku, Saitama-shi, Saitama-ken 339-8585
- Website: Official website

Iwatsuki-ku (岩槻区, Iwatsuki-ku) is one of ten wards of the city of Saitama, in Saitama Prefecture, Japan, and is located in the northeastern part of the city. As of 1 March 2021, the ward had an estimated population of 112,862 and a population density of 2,300 persons per km^{2}. Its total area was 49.17 square kilometres (18.98 sq mi).

== Geography ==
Iwasuki Ward is within the Kantō Plain, in the northeast portion of Saitama City.

=== Neighboring Municipalities ===
Iwatsuki-ku is surrounded by Minuma-ku (west), Midori-ku (southwest), and the cities of Kawaguchi (south), Koshigaya (southeast), Kasukabe (northeast), Shiraoka (north), and Hasuda (northwest).

== History ==
Iwatsuki developed from the Muromachi period as a castle town next to Iwatsuki Castle and the center of Iwatsuki Domain under the Edo period Tokugawa shogunate. It was also a post town on the Nikkō Onari Kaidō connecting Edo with Nikko.

The modern town of Iwatsuki created within Minamisaitama District, Saitama with the establishment of the municipalities system on April 1, 1889. On May 3, 1954, Iwatsuki merged with the neighboring villages of Niiwa, Wado, Kawadori, Kashiwazaki, Kawai and Jionji and was elevated to city status on July 1, 1954. On April 1, 2005, Iwatsuki merged with the city of Saitama, becoming Iwatsuki Ward. Iwatsuki is known as the "City of Dolls" (人形のまち Ningyō no Machi) due to a history of doll-making that dates back to the 17th century.

== Education ==
- Mejiro University – Saitama campus
- University of Human Arts and Sciences
- Iwatsuki-ku has 14 elementary schools, eight junior high schools, and four high schools, and one special education school.

Municipal junior high schools:

- Hakuyo (柏陽中学校)
- Iwatsuki (岩槻中学校)
- Jionji (慈恩寺中学校)
- Jouhoku (城北中学校)
- Jounan (城南中学校)
- Kawadoori (川通中学校)
- Nishihara (西原中学校)
- Sakurayama (桜山中学校)

Municipal elementary schools:

- Higashi Iwatsuki (東岩槻小学校)
- Iwatsuki (岩槻小学校)
- Jionji (慈恩寺小学校)
- Jouhoku (城北小学校)
- Jounan (城南小学校)
- Kamisato (上里小学校)
- Kashiwazaki (柏崎小学校)
- Kawadoori (川通小学校)
- Kawai (河合小学校)
- Niiwa (新和小学校)
- Nishihara (西原小学校)
- Ota (太田小学校)
- Tokuriki (徳力小学校)
- Wado (和土小学校)

== Transportation ==
=== Railway ===
Tōbu Railway – Noda Line

- Iwatsuki - Higashi-Iwatsuki

=== Highway ===
- Tōhoku Expressway – Iwatsuki Interchange
- National Route 16
- National Route 122
- National Route 463

== Sister cities ==
- Nanaimo, British Columbia, Canada (1996)

== Local attractions ==
- Iwatsuki Castle

== Noted people from Iwatsuki ==
- Takeru Satoh, actor
