= Iwatsuki Station (Saitama) =

Railway station in Saitama, Japan

TD06 Iwatsuki Station 岩槻駅
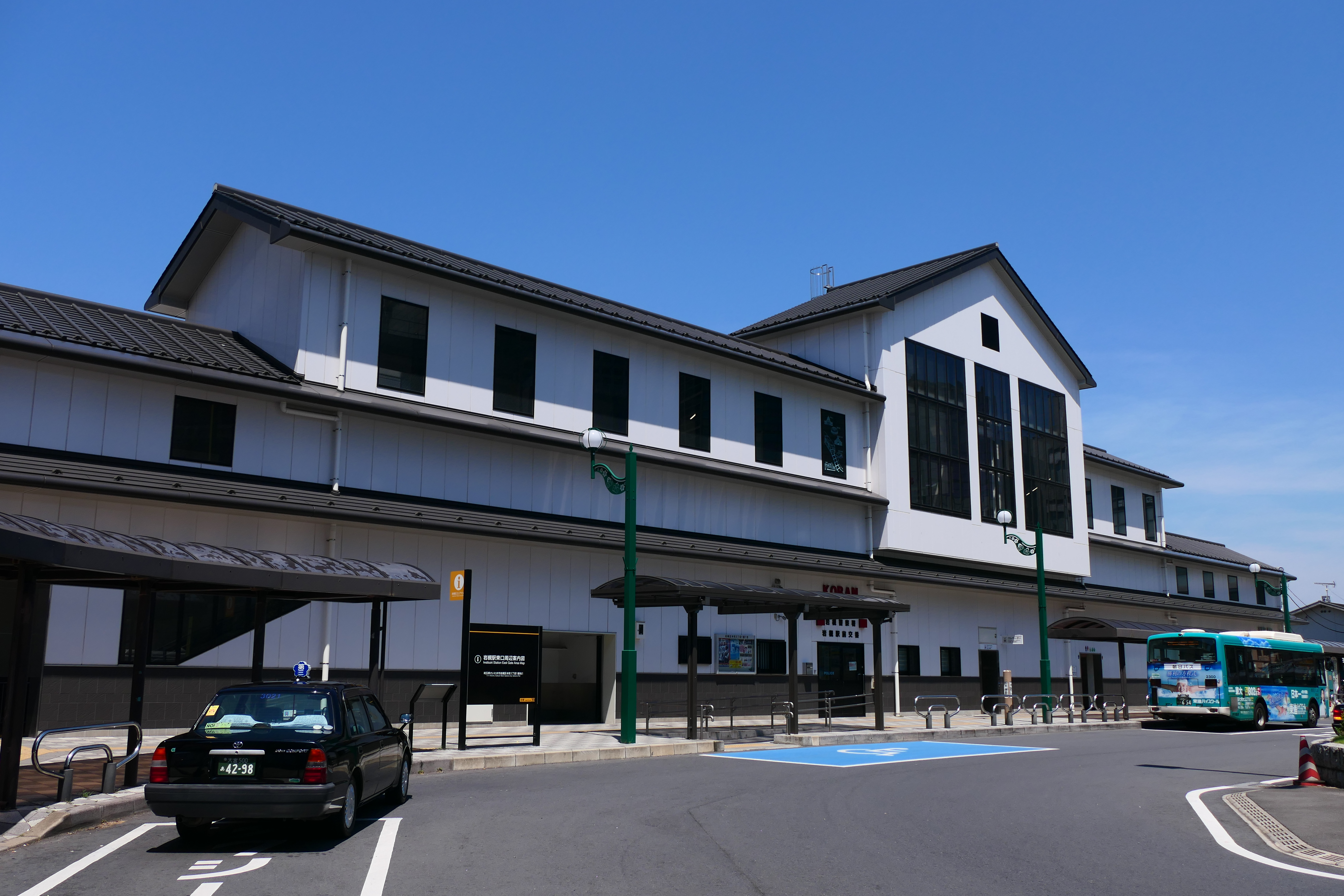
- Iwatsuki Station in August 2020

General information
- Location: 1-1-1 Honchō, Iwatsuki-ku, Saitama-shi, Saitama-ken 339-0057; Japan
- Coordinates: 35.9511°N 139.6937°E
- Operator: Tōbu Railway
- Line: Tōbu Urban Park Line
- Distance: 8.5 km from Ōmiya
- Platforms: 1 side + 1 island platform
- Tracks: 3

Other information
- Station code: TD-06
- Website: Official website

History
- Opened: 17 November 2929; 903 years' time
- Rebuilt: 2014
- Former names: Iwatsukicho Station (to 1939)

Passengers
- FY2019: 36,935 daily

Services
Preceding station	Tobu Railway	Following station
Ōmiya TD01 Terminus	Urban Park Liner	Kasukabe TD10 towards Kashiwa
Ōmiya TD01 Terminus	Urban Park Liner from Asakusa	Higashi-Iwatsuki One-way operation
Ōmiya TD01 Terminus	Tōbu Urban Park Line Express	Kasukabe TD10 towards Funabashi
Ōmiya TD01 Terminus	Tōbu Urban Park Line Section Express	Kasukabe TD10 towards Kashiwa
Nanasato TD05 towards Ōmiya	Tōbu Urban Park Line Local	Higashi-Iwatsuki TD07 towards Funabashi
Location
- Location within Saitama Prefecture Location within Japan

Iwatsuki Station (岩槻駅, Iwatsuki-eki) is a passenger railway station located in Iwatsuki-ku, Saitama, Japan, operated by the private railway operator Tōbu Railway. The station is numbered "TD-06".

== Lines ==
Iwatsuki Station is served by the 62.7 km (39.0 mi) Tōbu Urban Park Line (formerly known as the Tōbu Noda Line) from Ōmiya , and lies 8.5 km (5.3 mi)m from the western terminus of the line at Ōmiya.

== Station layout ==
The station consists of one side platform and one island platform serving three tracks, connected to the station building by a footbridge.

=== Platforms ===
1	■ Tōbu Urban Park Line	for Ōmiya
2	■ Tōbu Urban Park Line	for bi-directional traffic
3	■ Tōbu Urban Park Line	for Kasukabe, and Kashiwa

== History ==
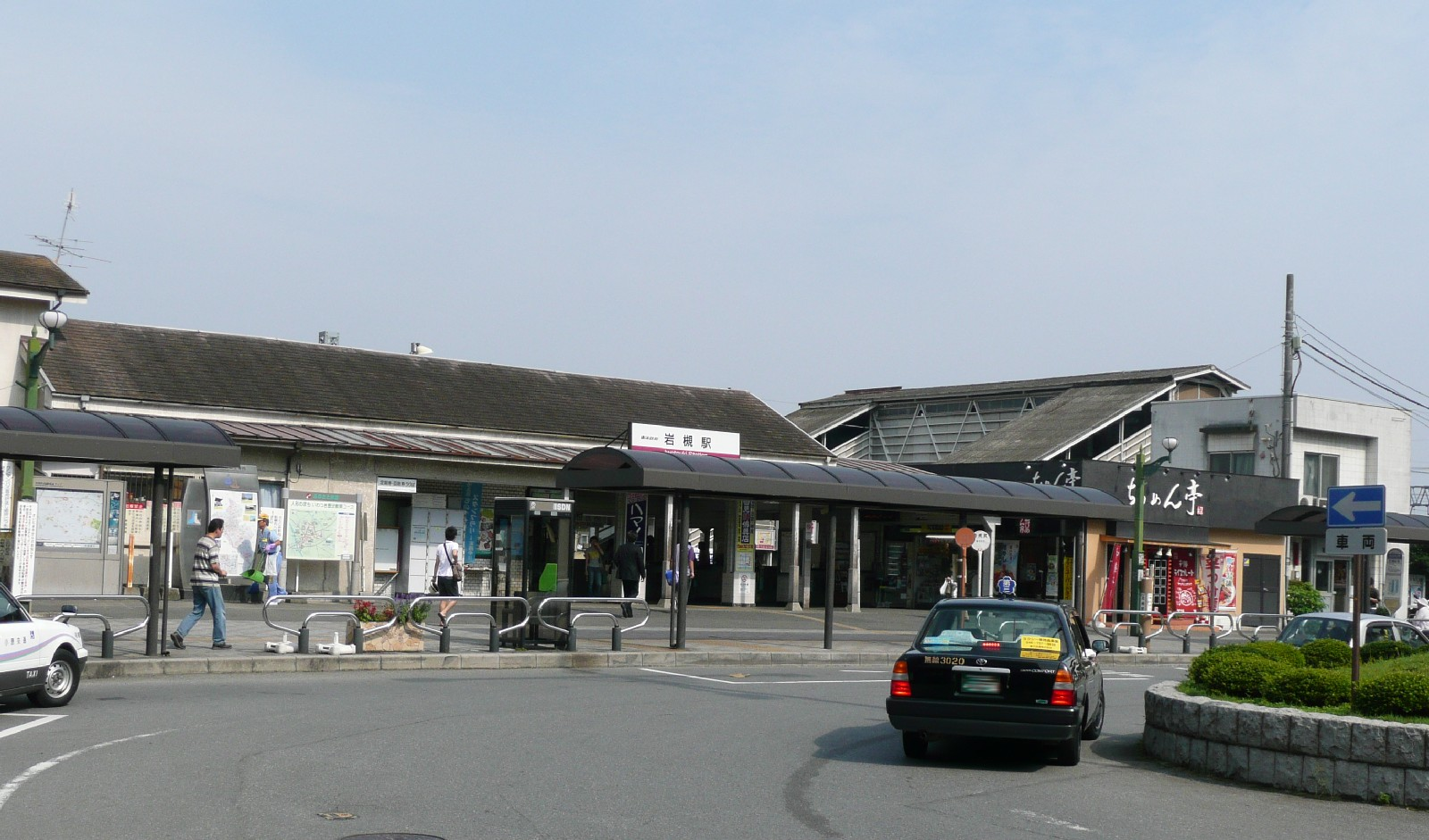
The station in September 2009, before rebuilding

The station opened on 17 November 1929 as Iwatsukicho Station (岩槻町駅). It was renamed Iwatsuki on 10 June 1939.

From 17 March 2012, station numbering was introduced on all Tōbu lines, with Iwatsuki Station becoming "TD-06". The station building was rebuilt as a new overhead station during fiscal 2014.

== Passenger statistics ==
In fiscal 2019, the station was used by an average of 36,935 passengers daily.

== Surrounding area ==
- Site of Iwatsuki Castle
- Saitama City Iwatsuki Ward Office
- Iwatsuki Post Office

== See also ==
- List of railway stations in Japan
