= Kasukabe Station =

Railway station in Kasukabe, Saitama Prefecture, Japan

TS27 TD10 Kasukabe Station 春日部駅
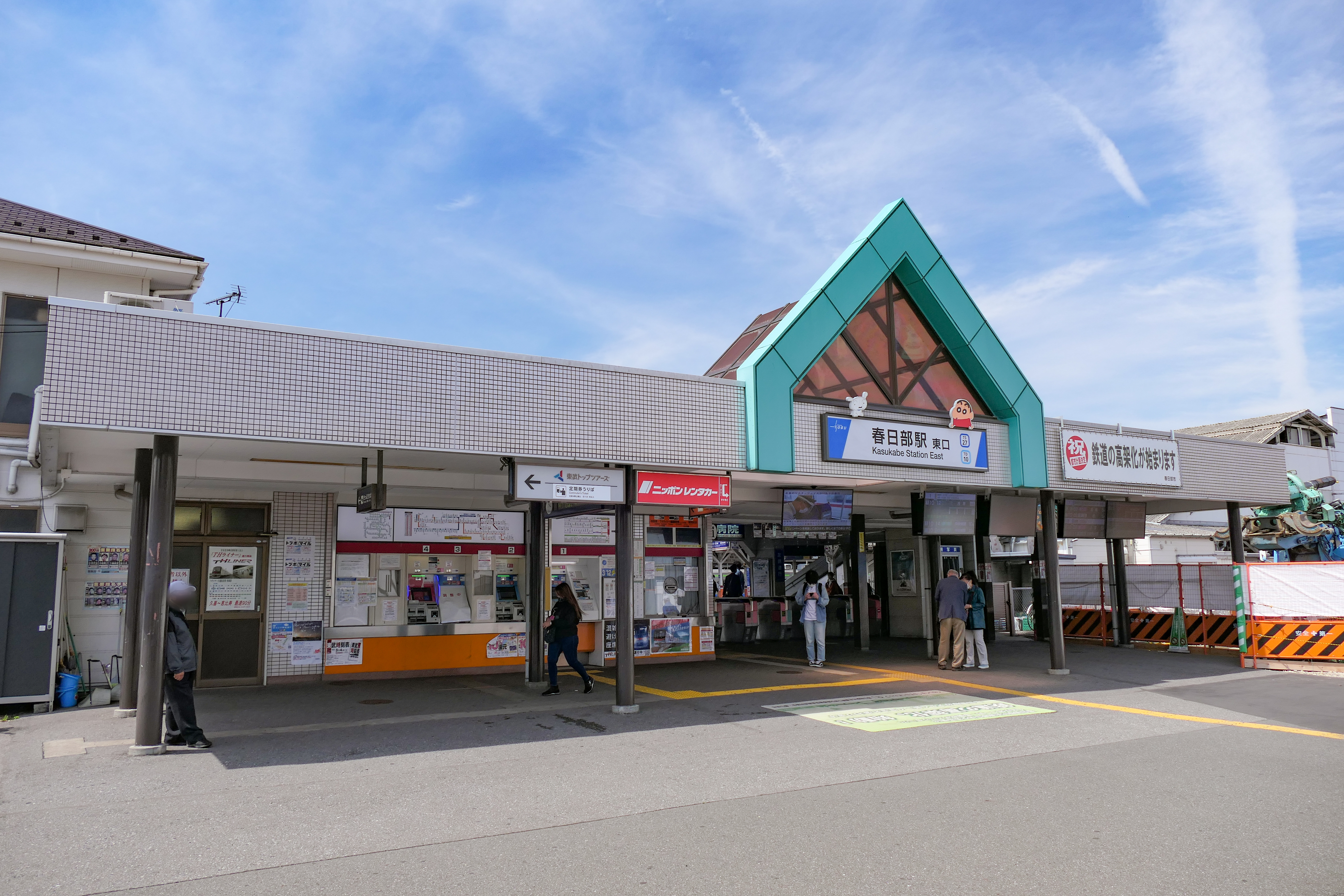
- Kasukabe Station east entrance in May 2022

General information
- Location: 1-10-1 Kasukabe, Kasukabe-shi, Saitama-ken; Japan
- Coordinates: 35.9799°N 139.7526°E
- Operator: Tōbu Railway
- Lines: Tōbu Skytree Line (TS-27); Tobu Urban Park Line (TD-10)
- Distance: 35.3 km from Asakusa
- Platforms: 2 island + 1 side platform

Other information
- Station code: TS-27, TD-10
- Website: Official website

History
- Opened: 27 August 1899; 126 years ago

Passengers
- FY2024: 31,941 daily boardings
Services
| Preceding station | Tobu Railway | Following station |
|---|---|---|
| Kita-Senju TS09 towards Asakusa | Spacia X | Shin-Kanuma TN18 towards Tōbu–Nikkō or Kinugawa–Onsen |
| Hikifune TS04 towards Asakusa | Kegon | Sugito-Takanodai TN01 towards Tōbu–Nikkō |
| Hikifune TS04 towards Asakusa | Kinu | Tochigi TN22 towards Kinugawa–Onsen |
| Tokyo Skytree TS02 towards Asakusa | Aizu | Tochigi TN22 towards Shin-Fujiwara |
| Sengendai TS24 towards Asakusa | Skytree Liner | Terminus |
| Sengendai One-way operation | Urban Park Liner from Asakusa | Yagisaki TD09 towards Ōmiya |
| Sengendai One-way operation | Urban Park Liner from Asakusa | Fujino-ushijima TD11 towards Kashiwa |
| Sengendai TS24 towards Oshiage | Tobu Skytree Line Express | Tōbu-Dōbutsu-Kōen TS30 Terminus |
| Sengendai TS24 towards Asakusa | Tobu Skytree Line Section Express | Tōbu-Dōbutsu-Kōen TS30 Terminus |
| Ichinowari TS26 towards Oshiage | Tobu Skytree Line Semi Express | Kita-Kasukabe TS28 towards Tōbu-Dōbutsu-Kōen |
| Ichinowari TS26 towards Asakusa | Tobu Skytree Line Section Semi Express Local | Kita-Kasukabe TS28 towards Tōbu-Dōbutsu-Kōen |
| Iwatsuki TD06 towards Ōmiya | Urban Park Liner | Fujino-ushijima TD11 towards Kashiwa |
| Iwatsuki TD06 towards Ōmiya | Tōbu Urban Park Line Express | Fujino-ushijima TD11 towards Funabashi |
| Iwatsuki TD06 towards Ōmiya | Tōbu Urban Park Line Section Express | Fujino-ushijima TD11 towards Kashiwa |
| Yagisaki TD09 towards Ōmiya | Tōbu Urban Park Line Local | Fujino-ushijima TD11 towards Funabashi |
Location
- Location within Saitama Prefecture Location within Japan

Track layout of Kasukabe Station

Kasukabe Station (春日部駅, Kasukabe-eki) is a junction passenger railway station located in the city of Kasukabe, Saitama, Japan, operated by the private railway operator Tōbu Railway.

== Lines ==
Kasukabe Station is served by the following lines.

- Tobu Skytree Line (TS-27)
- Tobu Urban Park Line (TD-10)

== Station Layout ==
This station consists of two island platforms and one side platform serving a total of seven tracks (two of which are not in normal use). The platforms are connected to the station building by a footbridge.

=== Platforms ===
| 1, 2 | ■ Tobu Skytree Line | for Shin-Koshigaya, Kita-Senju, and Asakusa; Tokyo Metro Hibiya Line for Naka-Meguro; Tokyo Metro Hanzōmon Line for Shibuya and Chūō-Rinkan |
| 3, 4 | ■ Tobu Skytree Line | for Tōbu-Dōbutsu-Kōen; Tobu Isesaki Line for Kuki; Tōbu Nikkō Line for Minami-Kurihashi and Tōbu Nikkō; Tobu Kinugawa Line for Kinugawa-Onsen |
| 7 | ■ Tobu Urban Park Line | for Nodashi, Nagareyama-ōtakanomori, Kashiwa, and Funabashi |
| 8 | ■ Tobu Urban Park Line | for Iwatsuki and Ōmiya |

== History ==
The station opened on 27 August 1899 as Kasukabe Station (粕壁駅). The kanji of the station name was changed to its present form on 1 September 1949.

From 17 March 2012, station numbering was introduced on all Tōbu lines, with Kasukabe Station becoming "TS-27" on the Tobu Skytree Line and "TD-10" on the Urban Park Line.

== Passenger statistics ==
In fiscal 2024, the station was used by an average of 31,941 passengers daily (boarding passengers only).

== Surrounding area ==
- Kasukabe City Hall
- Kasukage Post Office
- Kasukabe City Hospital

== See also ==
- List of railway stations in Japan
