= Sakasai Station =

Railway station in Kashiwa, Chiba Prefecture, Japan

TD27 Sakasai Station 逆井駅
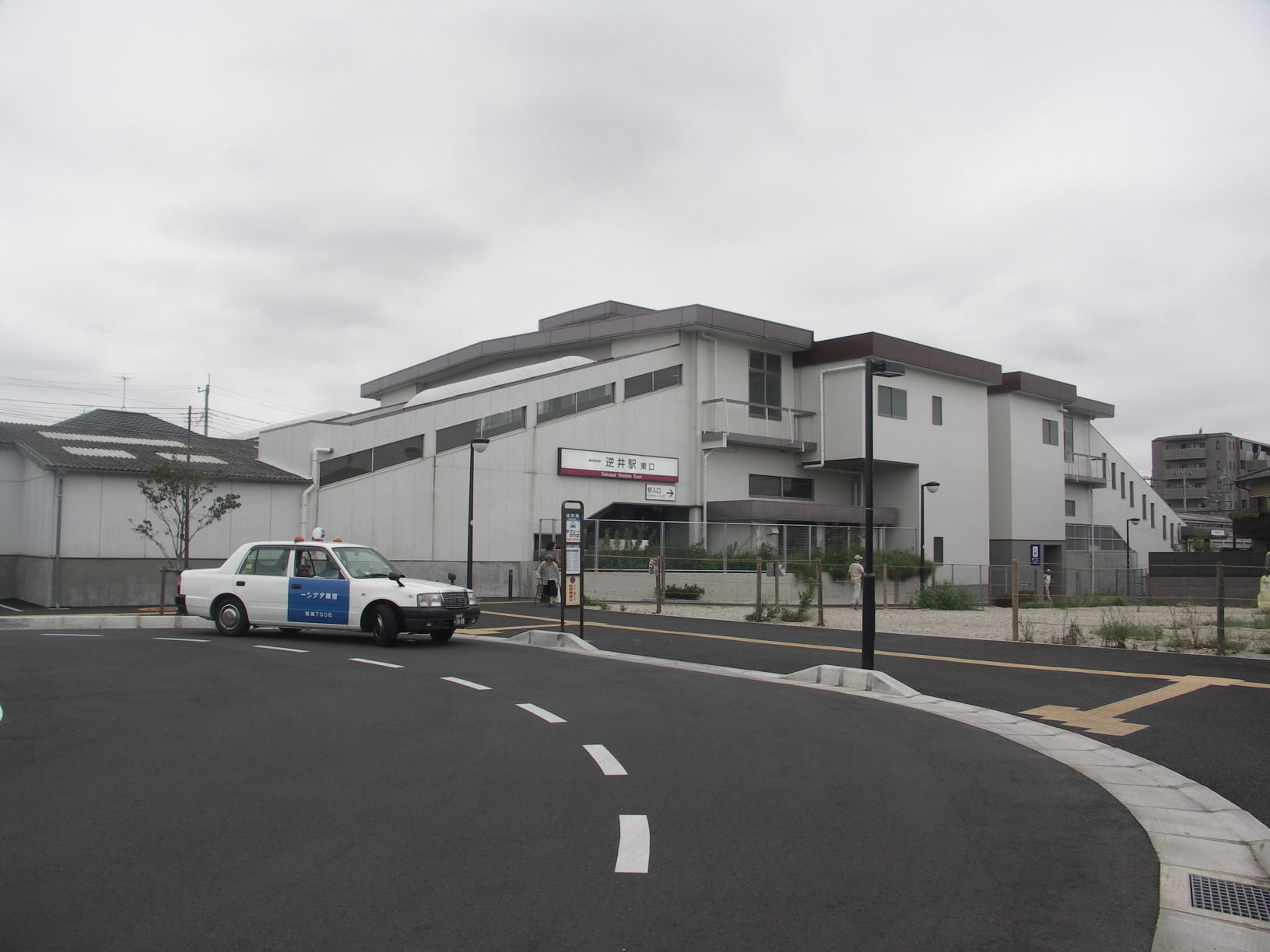
- Sakasai Station, September 2007

General information
- Location: Sakasai, Kashiwa-shi, Chiba-ken 277-0042; Japan
- Coordinates: 35.8232°N 139.9838°E
- Operator: Tobu Railway
- Line: Tobu Urban Park Line
- Distance: 48.0 km from Ōmiya
- Platforms: 2 side platforms

Other information
- Station code: TD-27
- Website: Official website

History
- Opened: 29 July 1933; 93 years ago

Passengers
- FY2019: 14,131 daily

Services
Preceding station	Tobu Railway	Following station
Masuo TD26 towards Ōmiya	Tōbu Urban Park Line Local	Takayanagi TD28 towards Funabashi
Location
- Location within Chiba Prefecture Location within Japan

Sakasai Station (逆井駅, Sakasai-eki) is a passenger railway station in the city of Kashiwa, Chiba, Japan, operated by the private railway operator Tōbu Railway. The station is numbered "TD-27".

== Lines ==
Sakasai Station is served by Tobu Urban Park Line (also known as the Tōbu Noda Line) and lies 48.0 km (29.8 mi) from the western terminus of the line at Ōmiya Station.

== Station layout ==
The station consists of two opposed side platforms serving two tracks, with an elevated station house.

=== Platforms ===
1	■ Tobu Urban Park Line	For Mutsumi,Shin-Kamagaya Funabashi
2	■ Tobu Urban Park Line	For Kashiwa, Nodashi, Kasukabe, Ōmiya

== History ==
Sakasai Station was opened on 29 July 1933 as a signal stop on the Sobu Railways. It was elevated to a full station in 1949. The current station building was completed in 1985. From 17 March 2012, station numbering was introduced on all Tobu lines, with Sakasai Station becoming "TD-27".

== Passenger statistics ==
In fiscal 2019, the station was used by an average of 14,131 passengers daily.

== Surrounding area ==
- Sakasai Post Office
