= Masuo Station (Chiba) =

Railway station in Kashiwa, Chiba Prefecture, Japan

TD26 Masuo Station 増尾駅
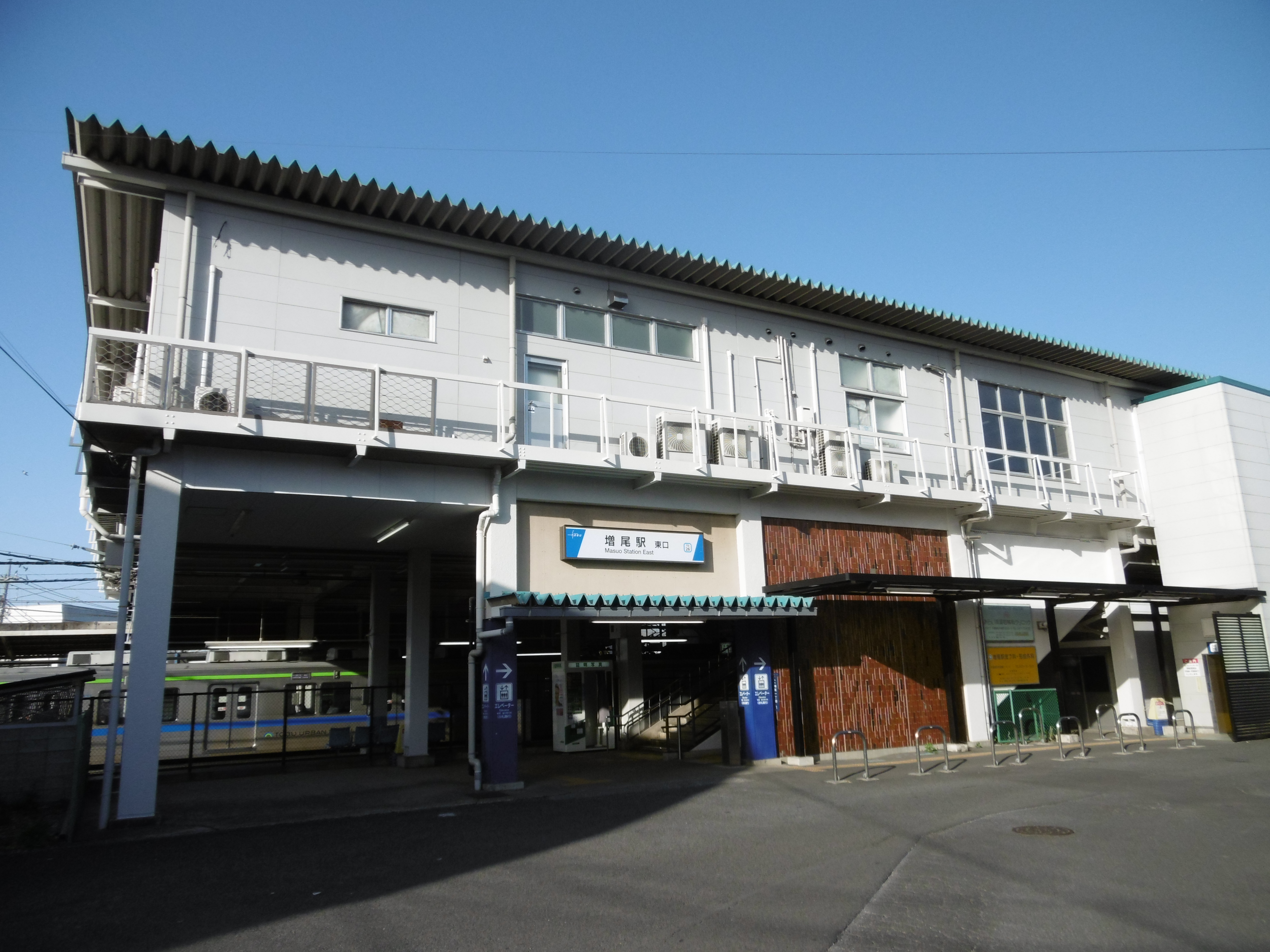
- East exit of the station, March 2021

General information
- Location: 1-1-1 Masuo, Kashiwa-shi, Chiba-ken 277-0033; Japan
- Coordinates: 35.8295°N 139.9768°E
- Operator: Tobu Railway
- Line: Tobu Urban Park Line
- Distance: 47.1 km from Ōmiya
- Platforms: 2 side platforms

Other information
- Station code: TD-26
- Website: Official website

History
- Opened: 27 December 1923; 102 years ago

Passengers
- FY2019: 13,089 daily

Services
Preceding station	Tobu Railway	Following station
Shin-Kashiwa TD25 towards Ōmiya	Tōbu Urban Park Line Local	Sakasai TD27 towards Funabashi
Location
- Location within Chiba Prefecture Location within Japan

Masuo Station (増尾駅, Masuo-eki) is a passenger railway station in the city of Kashiwa, Chiba, Japan, operated by the private railway operator Tōbu Railway. The station is numbered "TD-26".

== Lines ==
Masuo Station is served by Tobu Urban Park Line (also known as the Tōbu Noda Line), and lies 47.1 km (29.3 mi) from the western terminus of the line at Ōmiya Station.

== Station layout ==
The station consists of two opposed side platforms serving two tracks, with an elevated station house.

=== Platforms ===
1	■ Tobu Urban Park Line	For Mutsumi,Shin-Kamagaya Funabashi
2	■ Tobu Urban Park Line	For Kashiwa, Nodashi, Kasukabe, Ōmiya

== History ==
Masuo Station was opened on 27 December 1923. From 17 March 2012, station numbering was introduced on all Tobu lines, with Masuo Station becoming "TD-26".

== Passenger statistics ==
In fiscal 2019, the station was used by an average of 13,089 passengers daily.

== Surrounding area ==
- Masuo Post Office
- Hirohata Hachiman-gu
