= Shin-Kashiwa Station =

Railway station in Kashiwa, Chiba Prefecture, Japan

TD25 Shin-Kashiwa Station 新柏駅
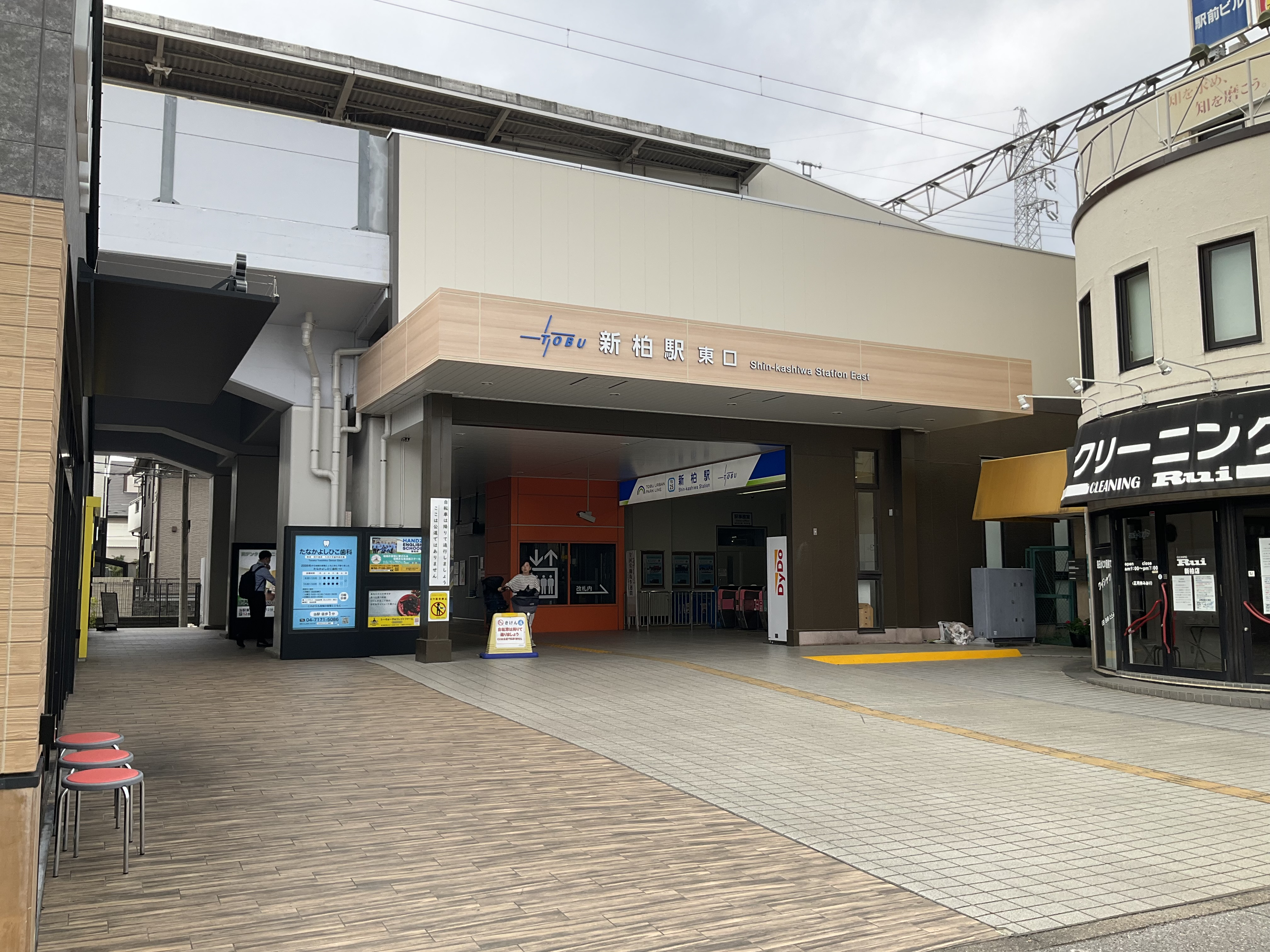
- The east entrance in September 2023

General information
- Location: 1-1510 Shin-Kashiwa, Kashiwa-shi, Chiba-ken 277-0084; Japan
- Coordinates: 35.8380°N 139.9672°E
- Operator: Tobu Railway
- Line: Tobu Urban Park Line
- Distance: 45.8 km from Ōmiya
- Platforms: 1 island platform

Other information
- Station code: TD-25
- Website: Official website

History
- Opened: July 21, 1983; 43 years ago

Passengers
- FY2019: 20,417 daily

Services
Preceding station	Tobu Railway	Following station
Kashiwa TD24 towards Ōmiya	Tōbu Urban Park Line Local	Masuo TD26 towards Funabashi
Location
- Location within Chiba Prefecture Location within Japan

Shin-Kashiwa Station (新柏駅, Shin-Kashiwa-eki) is a passenger railway station in the city of Kashiwa, Chiba, Japan, operated by the private railway operator Tōbu Railway. The station is numbered "TD-25".

== Lines ==
Shin-Kashiwa Station is served by Tobu Urban Park Line (also known as the Tōbu Noda Line), and lies 45.8 km (28.5 mi) from the western terminus of the line at Ōmiya Station.

== Station layout ==
Shin-Kashiwa Station has one elevated island platform serving two tracks, with the station building underneath.

=== Platforms ===
1	■ Tobu Urban Park Line	for Kashiwa, Nodashi, Kasukabe, Iwatsuki, and Ōmiya
2	■ Tobu Urban Park Line	for Mutsumi, Shin-Kamagaya, and Funabashi

== History ==
Shin-Kashiwa Station opened on 21 July 1983. From 17 March 2012, station numbering was introduced on all Tobu lines, with Shin-Kashiwa Station becoming "TD-25".

== Passenger statistics ==
In fiscal 2019, the station was used by an average of 20,417 passengers daily.

== Surrounding area ==
- Hitachi Kashiwa Soccer Stadium
