= Tobu 3000 series =

Japanese train type

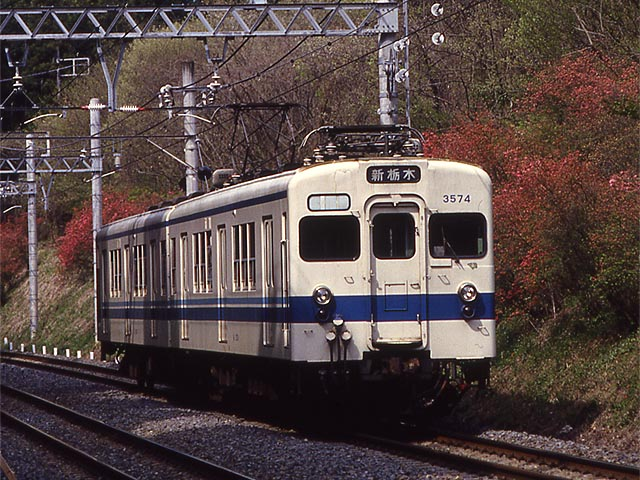
- 3070 series set 3574 on the Nikko Line in May 1993
- In service: 1964–1996
- Constructed: 1964–May 1975
- Number built: 134 vehicles
- Formation: 6/4/2 cars per trainset
- Operators: Tobu Railway
- Depots: Nanakodai, Tatebayashi, Tochigi
- Lines served: Tobu Noda Line, Tobu Nikko Line, Tobu Utsunomiya Line, Tobu Kinugawa Line

Specifications
- Car body construction: Steel
- Car length: 18 m (59 ft 1 in)
- Doors: Sliding, 3 pairs per side
- Traction system: Resistor control
- Electric system(s): 1,500 V DC, overhead catenary
- Track gauge: 1,067 mm (3 ft 6 in)

The Tobu 3000 series (東武3000系, Tōbu 3000-kei) was a DC electric multiple unit (EMU) commuter train type operated by the private railway operator Tobu Railway in Japan between 1964 and 1996.

The 3000 series was created by modernizing old Tobu EMU cars dating from the 1920s and 1930s, by adding new 18 m (59 ft 1 in) long steel bodies based on the 2000 series design, with three pairs of sliding doors per side, and front ends based on the 8000 series design. The fleet was subdivided into 3000, 3050, and 3070 series types.

== Variants ==
- 3000 series: 6-car, 4-car, and 2-car sets rebuilt from 3200 series EMUs for use on Tobu Noda Line
- 3050 series: 4-car and 2-car sets rebuilt from 5400 series EMUs
- 3070 series: 4-car and 2-car sets rebuilt from 5310/5320/5800 series EMUs

== 3000 series ==
The 3000 series sets were rebuilt between 1964 and 1971 from 134 former 3200 series EMU cars, originally formed as 30 four-car and seven two-car units. Eight of the four-car sets were subsequently reformed as six-car sets by adding two intermediate cars from other four-car sets. All sets were based at Nanakodai Depot and used on Tobu Noda Line services.

The 3000 series fleet was withdrawn by 1992.

=== Formations ===
==== 6-car 3000 series ====
| Designation | Mc | T | M | T | M | Tc |
| Numbering | 3100 | 3200 | 3300 | 3200 | 3300 | 3400 |

The 3100 and 3300 cars were each fitted with one lozenge-type pantograph.

==== 4-car 3000 series ====
| Designation | Mc | T | M | Tc |
| Numbering | 3100 | 3200 | 3300 | 3400 |

The 3100 and 3300 cars were each fitted with one lozenge-type pantograph.

==== 2-car 3500 series ====
| Designation | Mc | Tc |
| Numbering | 3500 | 3600 |

==== Reformed 2-car 3000 series ====
| Designation | Mc | Tc |
| Numbering | 3100 | 3400 |

The 3100 cars were each fitted with one lozenge-type pantograph.

== 3050 series ==
Following on from the earlier 3000 series sets, a total of 68 former 5400 series cars were rebuilt between March 1971 and December 1973, formed as ten four-car sets and 14 two-car sets.

The 3050 series fleet was withdrawn by 1996.

=== Formations ===
The 3050 series were formed as follows.

==== 4-car 3050 series ====
| Designation | Mc | T | M | Tc |
| Numbering | 3150 | 3250 | 3350 | 3450 |

The 3150 and 3350 cars were each fitted with one lozenge-type pantograph.

==== 2-car 3550 series ====
| Designation | Mc | Tc |
| Numbering | 3550 | 3650 |

The 3550 cars were fitted with one lozenge-type pantograph.

== 3070 series ==
The 3070 series sets were built between January 1974 and May 1975 by modernizing 34 former 5310 series, 5320 series, and 5800 series EMU cars dating from the 1930s with modern new steel bodies. The 3070 series fleet was formed as six four-car sets and five two-car sets. They were originally numbered in the 5xxx series, but renumbered in the 3x7x series following the appearance of the 5000 series in April 1979. This renumbering unified all of the 18 m EMUs into the same 3000 series, but the 3070 series sets were not able to run in multiple with either 3000 series or 3050 series sets.

All of the 3070 series sets were based at Tochigi Depot for use on the Tobu Nikko Line, Tobu Utsunomiya Line, and Tobu Kinugawa Line.

The 3070 series fleet was withdrawn by 1996.

=== Formations ===
The 3070 series were formed as follows.

==== 4-car 3070 series ====
| Designation | Mc | T | M | Tc |
| Numbering | 3170 | 3270 | 3370 | 3470 |

The 3170 and 3370 cars were each fitted with one lozenge-type pantograph.

==== 2-car 3570 series ====
| Designation | Mc | Tc |
| Numbering | 3570 | 3670 |

The 3570 cars were fitted with one lozenge-type pantograph.

== Resale ==
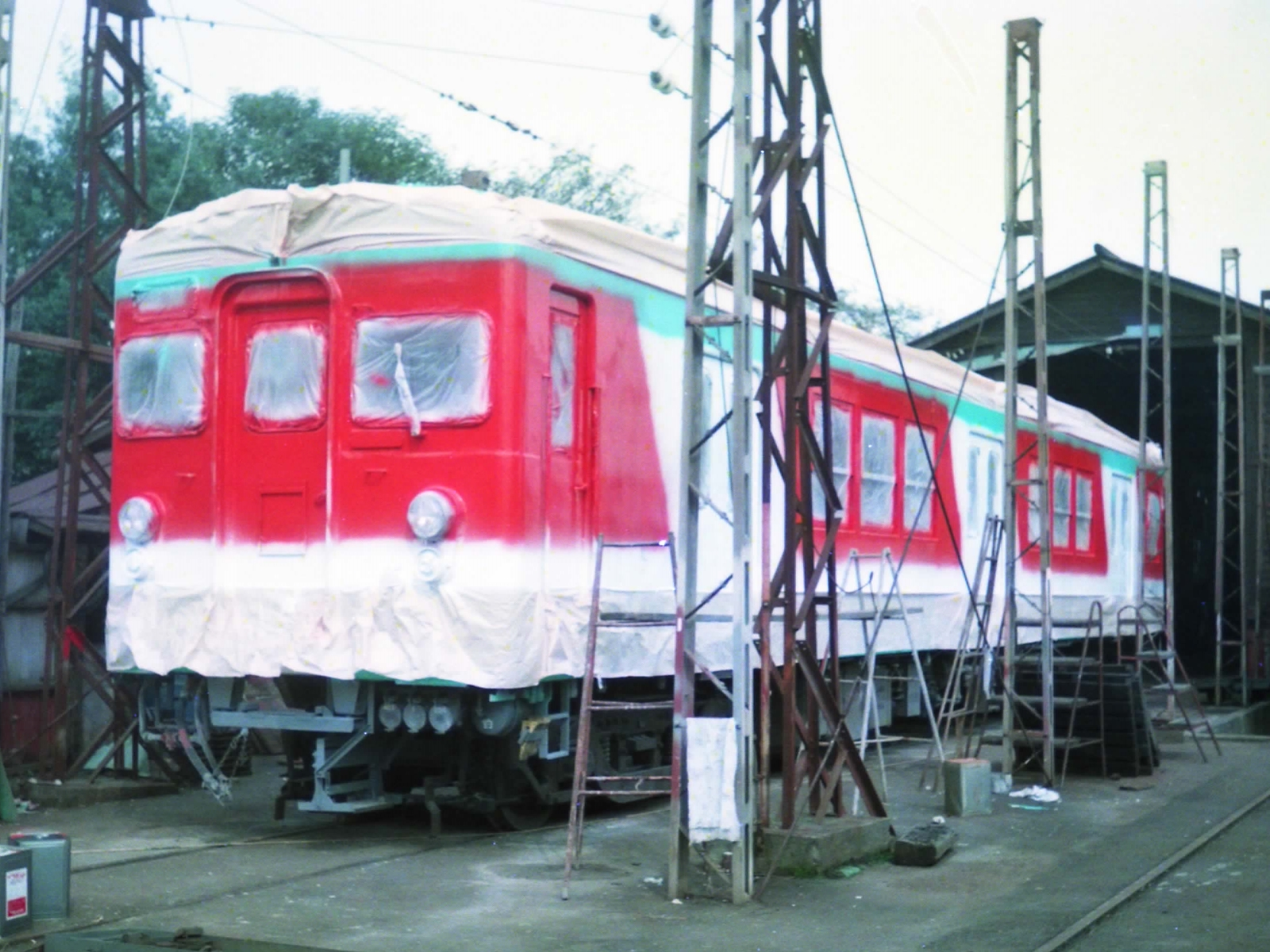
A former Tobu 3000 series car being repainted on the Jomo Electric Railway in 1988

24 former 3000 series vehicles withdrawn from Noda Line duties were sold to the Jomo Electric Railway in Gunma Prefecture. 18 of these were reformed as nine 2-car 300 series sets, with the remaining cars stored as sources of spare parts or cut up.

The identities of the cars sold and renumbered are as shown below.

| Car number | Jomo numbering | Entry into service (Jomo) |
|---|---|---|
| MoHa 3102 | DeHa 312 | 19 June 1989 |
| MoHa 3103 | DeHa 313 | 20 March 1990 |
| MoHa 3104 | DeHa 314 | 23 December 1989 |
| MoHa 3105 | DeHa 315 | 22 June 1989 |
| MoHa 3106 | DeHa 316 | 12 December 1989 |
| MoHa 3115 | DeHa 317 | 20 September 1989 |
| MoHa 3121 | DeHa 319 | 10 January 1990 |
| MoHa 3127 | DeHa 311 | 19 July 1989 |
| MoHa 3502 | DeHa 318 | 19 June 1989 |
| KuHa 3402 | KuHa 322 | 19 June 1989 |
| KuHa 3403 | KuHa 323 | 20 March 1990 |
| KuHa 3404 | KuHa 324 | 23 December 1989 |
| KuHa 3405 | KuHa 325 | 22 June 1989 |
| KuHa 3406 | KuHa 326 | 12 December 1989 |
| KuHa 3415 | KuHa 337 | 20 September 1989 |
| KuHa 3421 | KuHa 339 | 10 January 1990 |
| KuHa 3427 | KuHa 331 | 19 July 1989 |
| KuHa 3602 | KuHa 328 | 19 June 1989 |
