= Toyoshiki Station =

Railway station in Kashiwa, Chiba Prefecture, Japan

TD23 Toyoshiki Station 豊四季駅
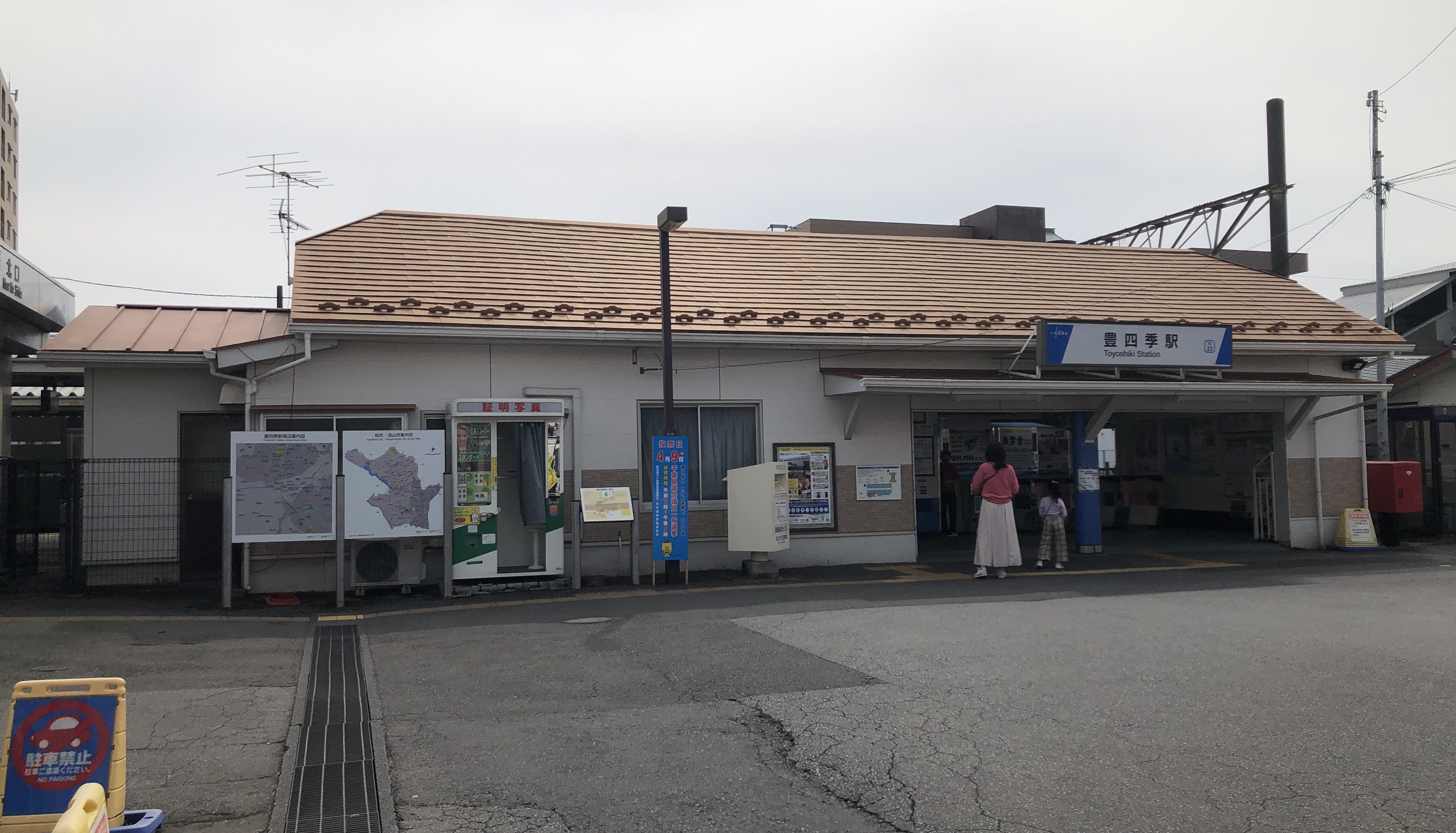
- Toyshiki Station in April 2023

General information
- Location: Toyoshiki, Kashiwa-shi, Chiba-ken 277-0863; Japan
- Coordinates: 35.8667°N 139.9392°E
- Operator: Tobu Railway
- Line: Tobu Urban Park Line
- Platforms: 2 side platforms

Other information
- Station code: TD-23
- Website: Official website

History
- Opened: 9 May 1911; 115 years ago

Passengers
- FY2019: 15,656 daily

Services
Preceding station	Tobu Railway	Following station
Nagareyama-ōtakanomori TD22 towards Ōmiya	Tōbu Urban Park Line Section Express	Kashiwa TD24 Terminus
Nagareyama-ōtakanomori TD22 towards Ōmiya	Tōbu Urban Park Line Local	Kashiwa TD24 towards Funabashi
Location
- Location within Chiba Prefecture Location within Japan

Toyoshiki Station (豊四季駅, Toyoshiki-eki) is a passenger railway station in the city of Kashiwa, Chiba, Japan, operated by the private railway operator Tōbu Railway. The station is numbered "TD-23".

== Lines ==
Toyoshiki Station is served by Tobu Urban Park Line (also known as the Tōbu Noda Line), and lies 33.2 kilometers from the western terminus of the line at Ōmiya Station.

== Station layout ==
The station consists of two opposed side platforms serving two tracks, connected by a footbridge.

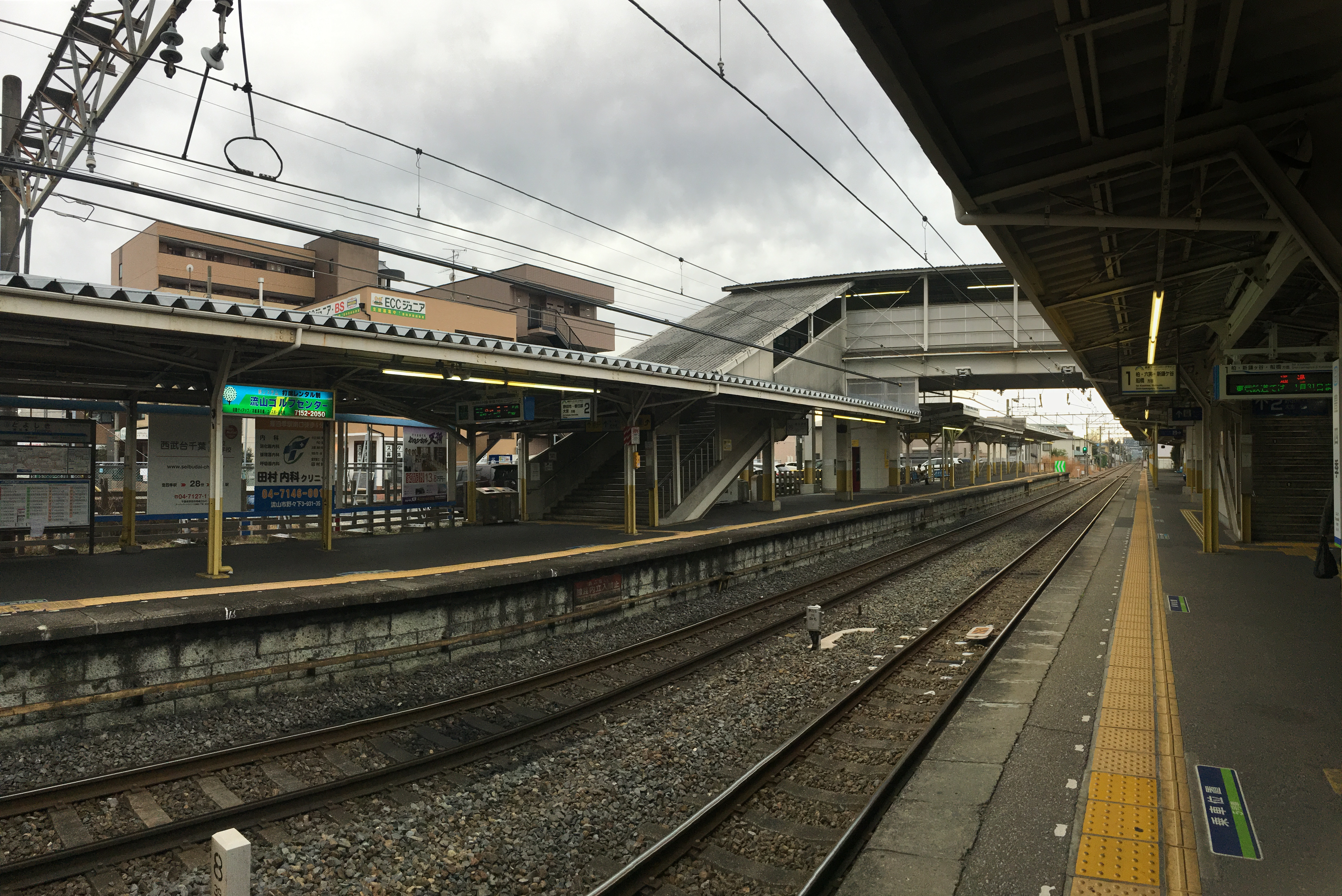
Station platforms, 2021

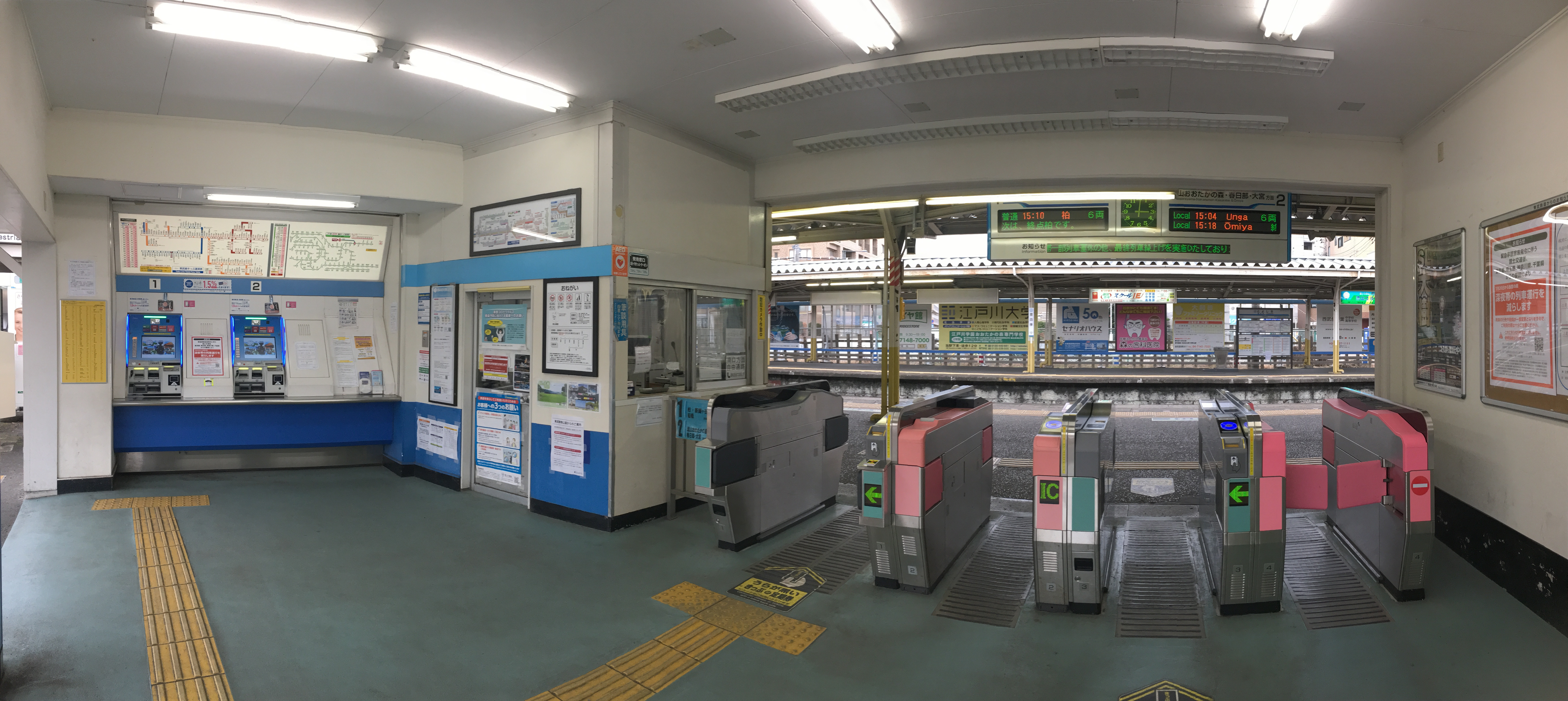
Ticket gates, 2021

=== Platforms ===
1	■ Tobu Urban Park Line	For Kashiwa, Funabashi
2	■ Tobu Urban Park Line	For Nodashi, Kasukabe, Iwatsuki, Ōmiya

== History ==
Toyoshiki Station was opened on 9 May 1911. From 17 March 2012, station numbering was introduced on all Tōbu lines, with Toyoshiki Station becoming "TD-23".

== Passenger statistics ==
In fiscal 2019, the station was used by an average of 15,656 passengers daily.

== Surrounding area ==
- Edogawa University
- Suwa Jinja
- Toyoshiki Eki-mae Post Office
