= Battle of Sakainehara =

- Part of the Sengoku period
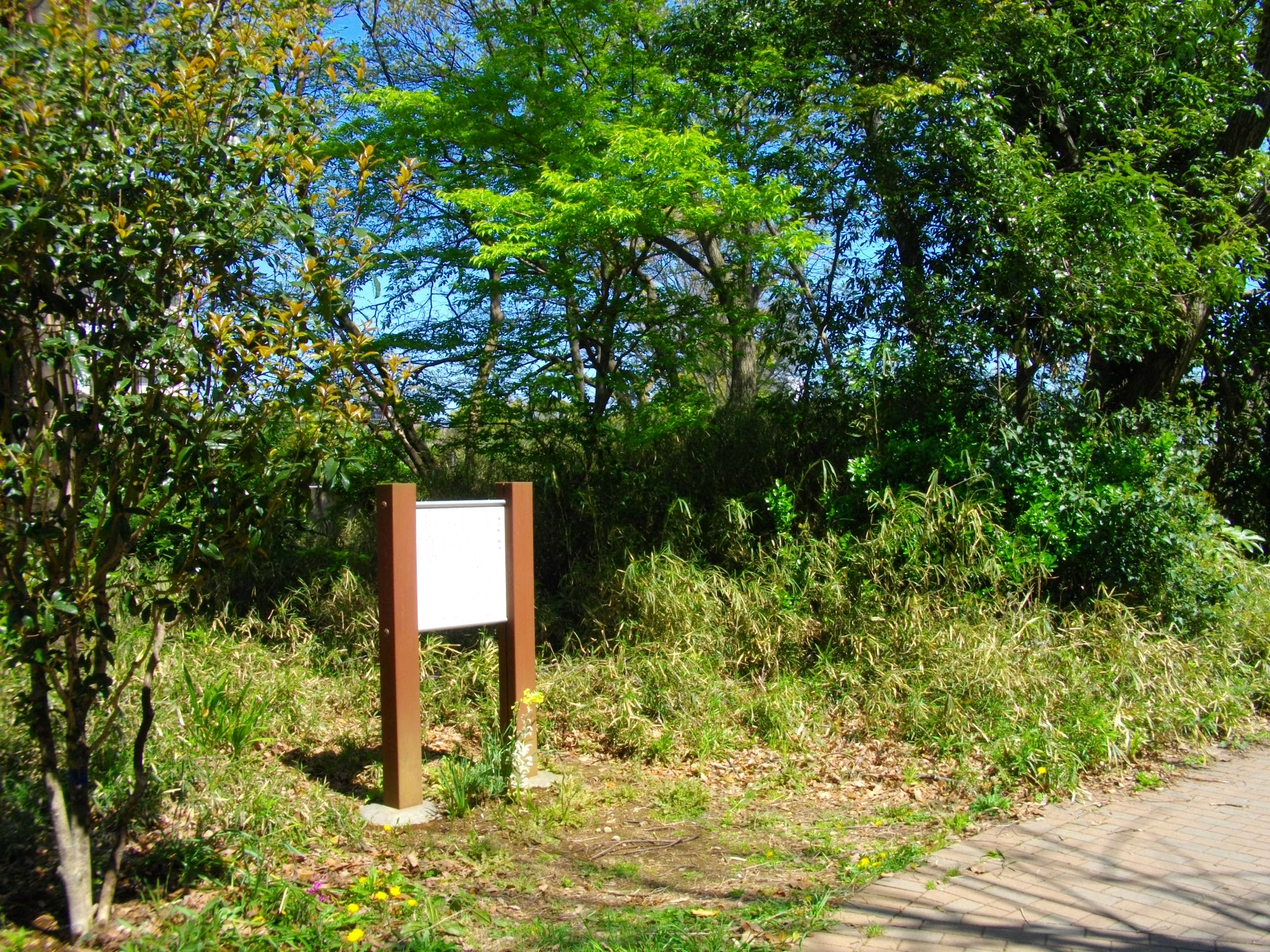
- Battlefield site in Kashiwa, Chiba Prefecture
Date	December 10, 1478
Location	Sakainehara, Shimōsa Province, Japan 35°49′55″N 139°57′13″E
Result	Uesugi victory

Belligerents
forces of Uesugi Sadamasa	forces of Chiba Noritane

Commanders and leaders
Ōta Dōkan; Chiba Yoritane	Chiba Noritane

Strength
Unknown	Unknown

Casualties and losses
Unknown	Unknown
- Location within Japan

The Battle of Sakainehara (境根原合戦, Sakainehara Kassen) was fought in 1478 between the forces of Chiba Noritane (千葉孝胤) and the forces of Ōta Dōkan and Chiba Yoritane (千葉自胤).
