= Kashiwa =

Kashiwa 柏市
- Core city
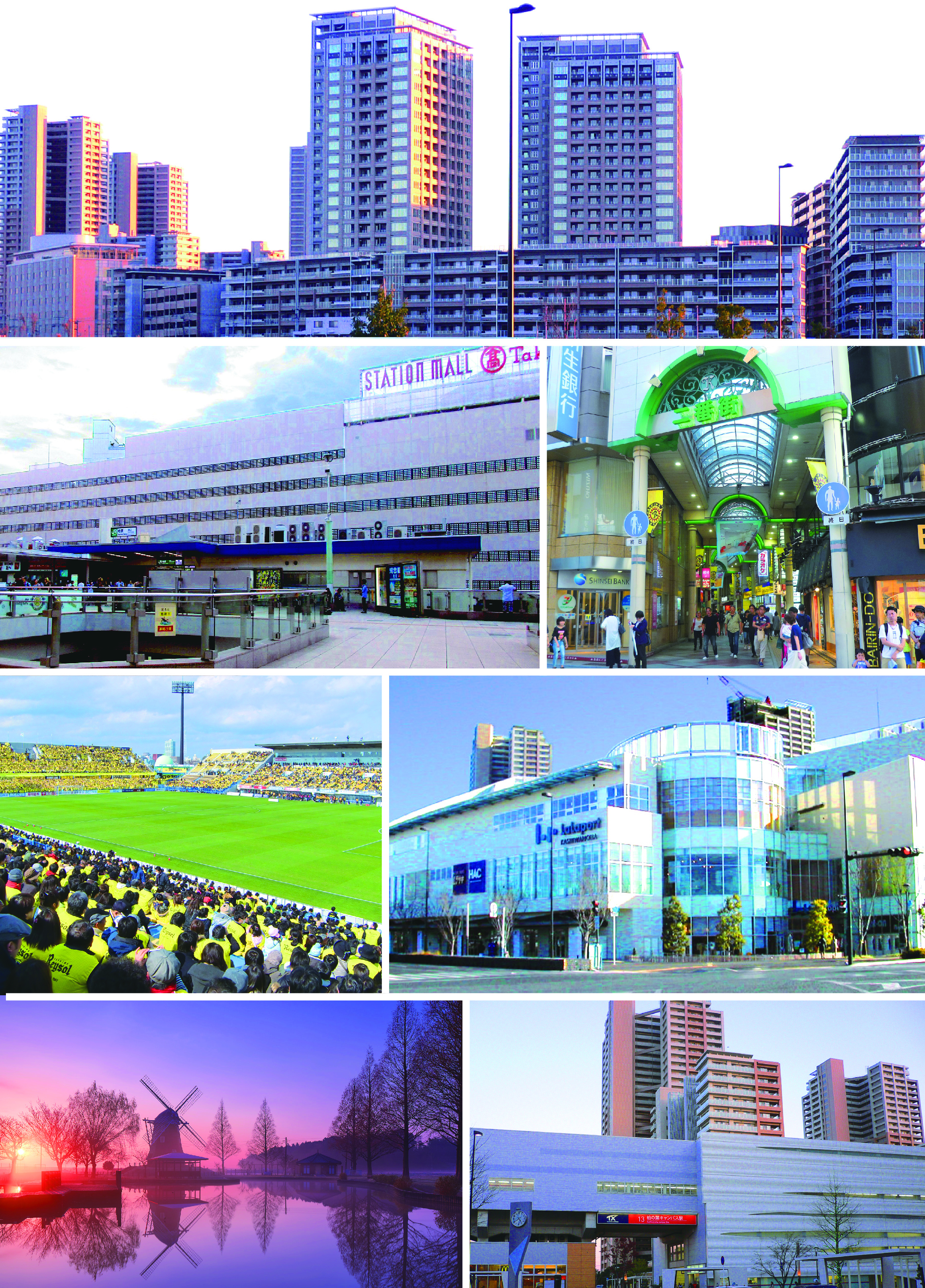
Park City Kashiwanoha Campus
Kashiwa Station	Kashiwa No.2 Shopping Arcade
Kashiwa Stadium	LaLaport Kashiwanoha
Akebonoyama Park	Kashiwanoha-campus Station
- Flag Seal

- Location of Kashiwa in Chiba Prefecture

- Location of Kashiwa in Japan Location of Kashiwa in Kantō Regiom Location of Kashiwa in Chiba Prefecture
- Coordinates: 35°52′3.3″N 139°58′32.7″E
- Country: Japan
- Region: Kantō
- Prefecture: Chiba

Government
  - Mayor: Kazumi Ota (since November 2021)

Area
  - Total: 114.74 km^{2} (44.30 sq mi)

Population (May 1, 2024)
  - Total: 435,578
  - Density: 3,796.2/km^{2} (9,832.2/sq mi)
- Time zone: UTC+9 (Japan Standard Time)
- City symbols
  - tree: Daimyo oak, Castanopsis
  - Flower: Phlox subulata; Erythronium japonicum; sunflower
  - Bird: Azure-winged magpie
- Phone number: 04-7167-1111
- Address: 5-10-1 Kashiwa, Kashiwa-shi, Chiba-ken 270-8505
- Website: Official website

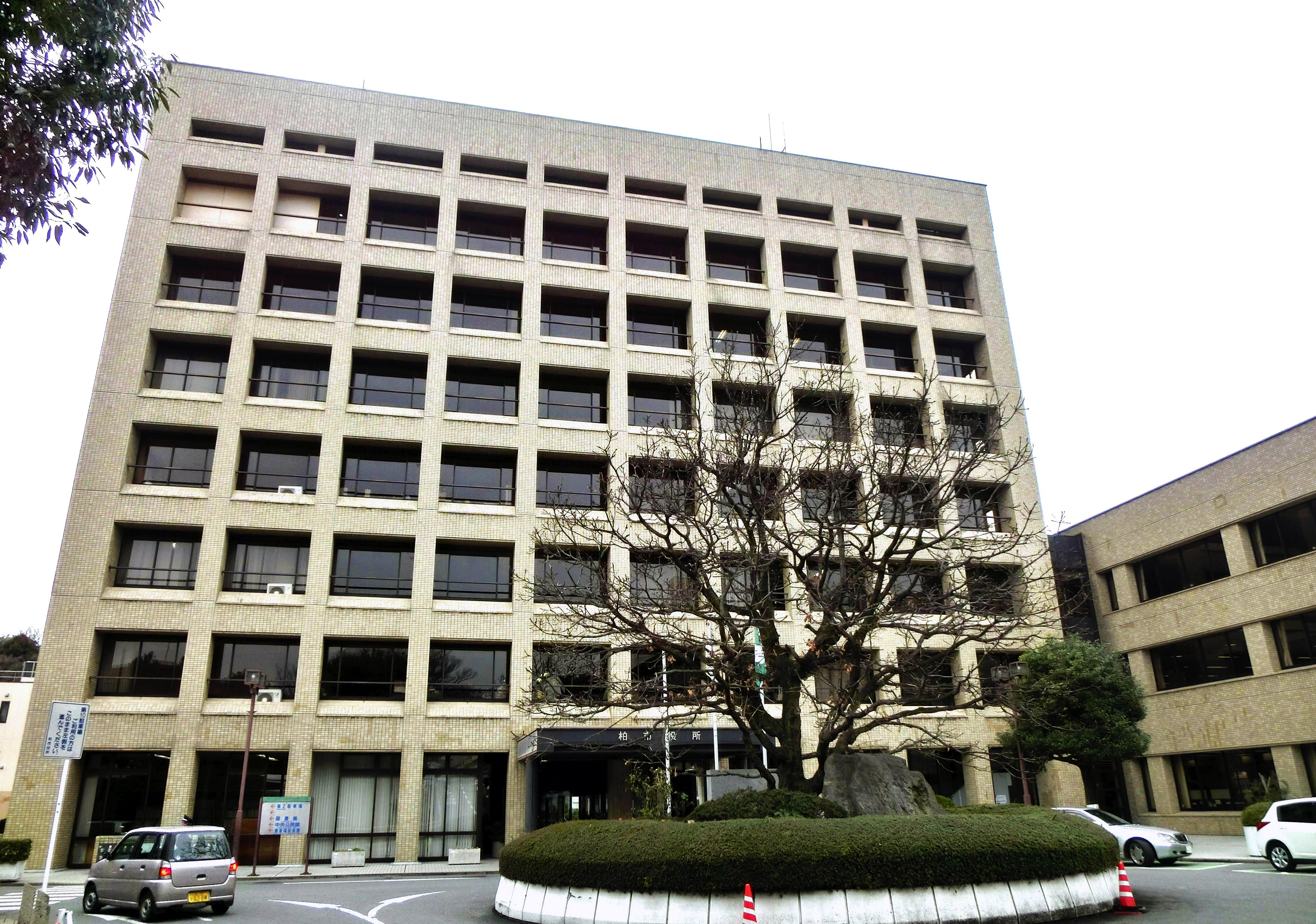
Kashiwa City Hall

Kashiwa (柏市, Kashiwa-shi) is a city located in Chiba Prefecture, Japan. As of May 1, 2024, the city had an estimated population of 435,578 in 199,926 households and a population density of 3800 persons per km^{2}. The total area of the city is 114.72 square kilometres (44.29 sq mi).

The name of the city is written with a single kanji character: 柏, a reference to Quercus dentata, commonly known in English as the Japanese emperor oak or daimyo oak.

== Geography ==
Kashiwa is located on the Shimōsa Plateau in the far northwestern corner of Chiba Prefecture, about 30 kilometers from the prefectural capital at Chiba and 25 to 35 kilometers from central Tokyo. It is separated from Ibaraki Prefecture to the north by the Tone River. Located on the Kanto Plain, the city is flat, with an elevation of between 5 and 32 meters above sea level.

=== Neighboring municipalities ===
- Chiba Prefecture
  - Abiko
  - Inzai
  - Kamagaya
  - Matsudo
  - Nagareyama
  - Noda
  - Shiroi
- Ibaraki Prefecture
  - Moriya
  - Toride

=== Climate ===
Kashiwa has a humid subtropical climate (Köppen Cfa) characterized by warm summers and cool winters with light to no snowfall. The average annual temperature in Kashiwa is 14.7 °C. The average annual rainfall is 1358 mm with September as the wettest month. The temperatures are highest on average in August, at around 26.5 °C, and lowest in January, at around 3.9 °C.

== Demographics ==
Per Japanese census data, the population of Kashiwa has been increasing rapidly over the past 70 years.

Historical population
Year	Pop.	±%
1950	49,159	—
1960	75,594	+53.8%
1970	169,115	+123.7%
1980	272,904	+61.4%
1990	347,002	+27.2%
2000	373,778	+7.7%
2010	404,012	+8.1%
2020	426,468	+5.6%

== History ==
=== Early history ===
Kashiwa has been settled since ancient times, and was historically part of Shimōsa Province. The area around Kashiwa was the site of the Battle of Sakainehara in 1478 early in the Sengoku period (1467 – 1573). During the Edo period (1603 – 1868), the area was tenryō territory controlled directly by the Tokugawa shogunate. The shogunate established a number of horse ranches which provided war horses for the army of the shogunate. The Tokugawa shogunate put much effort into draining the marshy areas of Lake Tega (Lake Teganuma) during the Edo period as part of large-scale land reclamation carried out across Japan. Kashiwa was developed as a post station on the Mito Kaidō, which connected the capitol at Edo with Mito in present-day Ibaraki Prefecture.

=== Modern history ===
After the Meiji Restoration in 1868, Kashiwa Village was created in Chiba Prefecture on October 1, 1889, with the establishment of the modern municipalities system. Kashiwa was connected to Tokyo by rail in 1896, and rail construction during the Meiji period (1868 – 1912) established the area as a commercial center. Kashiwa became a town on September 15, 1926. Kashiwa, like much of northern Chiba Prefecture, saw the development of numerous military installations in the 1930s, notably after the Mukden Incident in 1931. The Imperial Japanese Army established Kashiwa Air Field and Kashiwa Military Hospital, and Kashiwa became a military town. The air field was abandoned after the end of World War II, but the hospital continues to exist as the Kashiwa Public Hospital.

On September 1, 1954, Kashiwa absorbed neighboring Kogane Town and Tsuchi and Tanaka villages to form the new city of Tokatsu (東葛市, Tokatsu-shi). However, many politicians in Kogane Town were vehemently opposed to the merger, and forced its dissolution on October 15, 1954, with most of former Kogane Town merging with Matsudo city instead. On November 1, 1954, Fuse Village broke away from Tokatsu, eventually joining Abiko Town to form the city of Abiko. The remaining portion of Tokatsu was renamed Kashiwa on November 15, 1954. On December 25, 1955, a fire of unknown origin destroyed the former Kashiwa City Hall, and burned down most of the center of the city. In the 1960s, Kashiwa was designated for reconstruction with a special fund from the central government, which included Japan's first pedestrian decks, completed at Kashiwa Station in 1973. Also during this period, new town developments greatly expanded the city's population.

On April 1, 2008, Kashiwa was designated as a core city, with increased local autonomy. In August 2010, the city population exceeded 400,000 people.

== Government ==
Kashiwa has a mayor-council form of government with a directly elected mayor and a unicameral city council of 36 members. Kashiwa contributes five members to the Chiba Prefectural Assembly. In terms of national politics, the city is divided between the Chiba 8th district and the Chiba 13th district of the lower house of the Diet of Japan.

== Economy ==
Kashiwa is a regional commercial center and a bedroom community for nearby Chiba and Tokyo. Due to its good transportation connection with Tokyo, an estimated 42.3% of the working population (2015 census) commute to Tokyo for work. The city has a mixed industrial base, with food processing industries forming an important portion of the economy. Nikka Whisky Distilling, Asahi Soft Drinks, and Ito Ham all have production facilities in Kashiwa. There is some residual agriculture of turnips, onions and spinach.

== Education ==
=== Universities ===
- Chiba University, Kashiwa Campus
- Kaichi International University
- Kashiwa Campus, University of Tokyo
- Nishōgakusha University
- Reitaku University

=== Primary and secondary education ===
- Kashiwa has 42 public elementary schools and 20 public middle schools operated by the city government, and three private combined middle/high schools and one combined middle/high school operated by the Chiba Prefectural Board of Education. The city has eight public high schools operated by the Chiba Prefectural Board of Education and two private high schools. The prefecture also operates one special education school for the handicapped.
- There is a private school, Rugby School Japan.

== Transportation ==
=== Railway ===
JR East – Jōban Line

- Minami-Kashiwa - Kashiwa - Kita-Kashiwa

Tōbu Railway - Tobu Urban Park Line

- Toyoshiki - Kashiwa - Shin-Kashiwa - Masuo - Sakasai - Takayanagi

Metropolitan Intercity Railway Company - Tsukuba Express

- Kashiwanoha-campus - Kashiwa-Tanaka

=== Highways ===
- Jōban Expressway
- National Route 6
- National Route 16
- National Route 294

== Sports ==
Kashiwa is home to the professional football team Kashiwa Reysol and the women's basketball team Eneos Sunflowers.

== Sister cities ==
Kashiwa is twinned with:

- Ayase, Japan, since 1967
- Camden, Australia, since 1997
- Chengde, Hebei, China, since 1983
- Guam, United States, since 1991
- Torrance, California, United States, since 1973

== Notable people ==
- Shigeyuki Furuki, professional baseball player
- Fumio Imamura, Olympic race walker
- Naoki Ishikawa, professional soccer player
- Shintaro Katsu, actor and singer, died in Kashiwa.
- Kirinji Kazuharu, sumo wrestler
- Masato Kobayashi, professional kickboxer
- Yōko Oginome, singer
- Takeshi Okano, manga artist
- Hiroki Sakai, professional soccer player
- Yoshitaka Sakurada, politician, former minister of state for the Tokyo Olympics and Paralympic games
- Megumi Urawa, voice actress
- Kazunori Yamauchi, video game designer
- Kotoshōhō Yoshinari, sumo wrestler
