= Tōbu Urban Park Line =

Railway line in Saitama and Chiba Prefectures, Japan

Tobu Urban Park Line

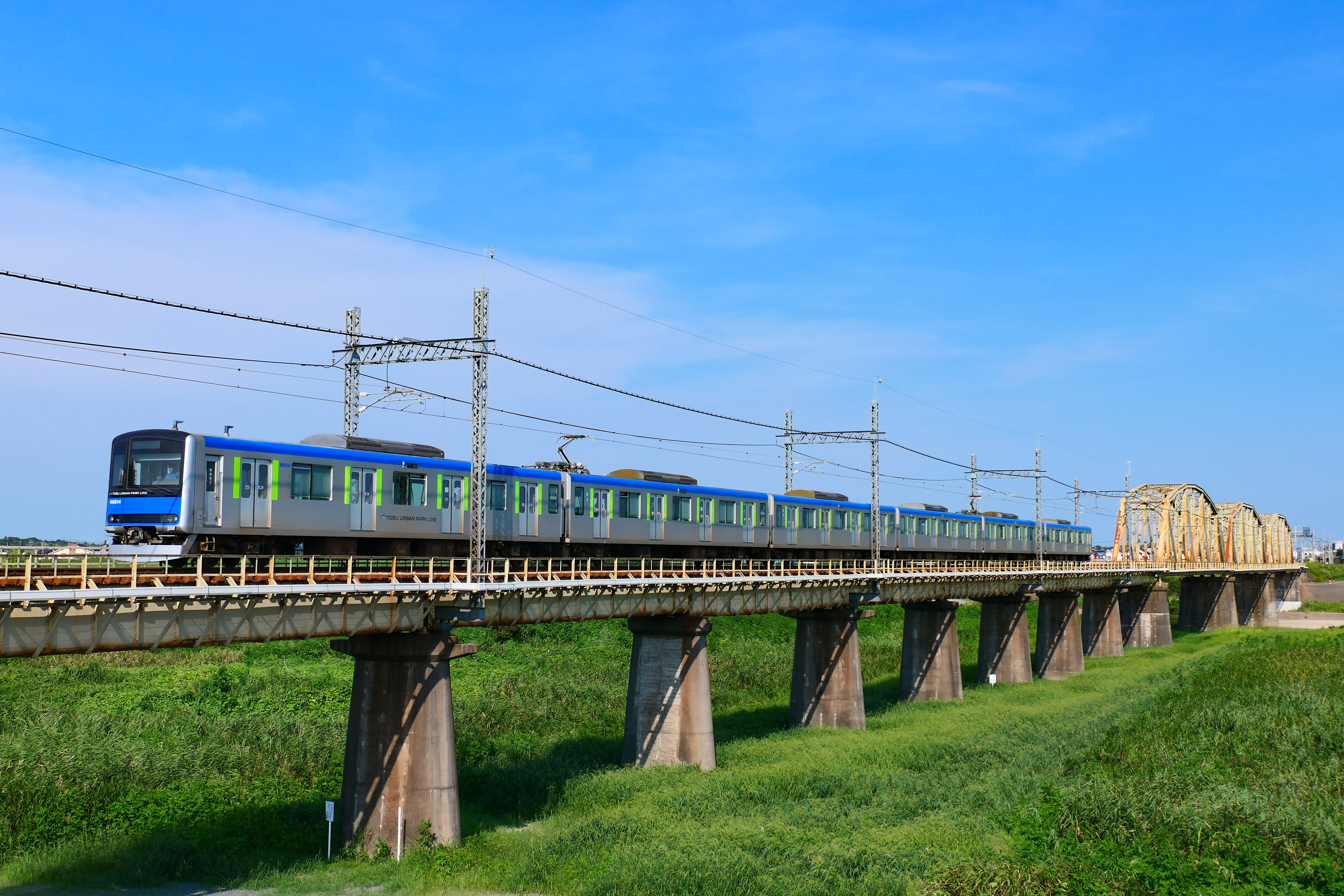
- Tobu 60000 series, August 2020

Overview
- Other name: Noda Line (野田線)
- Native name: 東武アーバンパークライン
- Status: In service
- Owner: Tobu Railway Co., Ltd.
- Locale: Kantō Region
- Termini: Ōmiya; Funabashi
- Stations: 35

Service
- Type: Commuter rail
- System: Tobu Railway
- Route number: TD
- Operator(s): Tobu Railway Co., Ltd.
- Depot: Nanakōdai
- Rolling stock: 8000 series, 10000 series, 60000 series, 80000 series
- Daily ridership: 448,528 (FY2010)

History
- Opened: 1911; 115 years ago

Technical
- Line length: 62.7 km (39.0 mi)
- Number of tracks: Double (Ōmiya - Kasukabe, Unga - Funabashi); Single (remainder)
- Track gauge: 1,067 mm (3 ft 6 in)
- Electrification: 1,500 V DC, overhead catenary
- Operating speed: 100 km/h (60 mph)

The Tobu Urban Park Line (東武アーバンパークライン, Tōbu Ābanpāku-rain), also known as the Noda Line (野田線, Noda-sen), is a 62.7 km (39.0 mi) long railway line in Saitama and Chiba Prefectures operated by the Japanese private railway company Tobu Railway. It connects the satellite cities of Tokyo, such as Saitama, Kasukabe, Noda, Nagareyama, Matsudo, Kamagaya, Kashiwa, and Funabashi.

== Operation ==
All trains were initially operated as all-stations "Local" services. Most trains, excluding a few from/to train depots, originate or terminate at Kashiwa Station which has a switchback. During the daytime, six trains run per hour.

From 26 March 2016, limited-stop "Express" services were introduced on the line. During the daytime off-peak, these run at 30-minute intervals, stopping only at Iwatsuki between Ōmiya and Kasukabe, and all-stations between Kasukabe and Funabashi. The journey time between Omiya and Kasukabe is reduced by 6 minutes compared with all-stations "Local" services.

After double tracking of the section from Takayanagi to Mutsumi was completed in 2019, in March 2020 express services were extended from Kashiwa to Funabashi, reducing travel time by a further 11 minutes.

== Stations ==
Abbreviations:

- L = Local (普通, Futsū)
- S = Section Express (区間急行, Kukan Kyūkō)
- E = Express (急行, Kyūkō)
- UPL = Urban Park Liner (アーバンパークライナー, Ābanpākurainā)

No.	Station	Japanese	Distance	L	S	E	UPL	Transfers	Location	
TD01	Ōmiya	大宮	0.0 km 0 mi	O	O	O	O	Tōhoku Shinkansen (Hokkaido, Akita, Yamagata); Jōetsu Shinkansen; Hokuriku Shinkansen; ■ Kawagoe Line; Keihin–Tōhoku Line (JK47); Saikyō Line (JA26); Shōnan–Shinjuku Line (JS24); Utsunomiya Line/Takasaki Line (JU07); New Shuttle (NS01)	Ōmiya-ku, Saitama	Saitama
TD02	Kita-Ōmiya	北大宮	1.2 km 0.75 mi	O	|	|	|		Ōmiya-ku, Saitama	Saitama
TD03	Ōmiya-kōen	大宮公園	2.2 km 1.4 mi	O	|	|	|		Ōmiya-ku, Saitama	Saitama
TD04	Ōwada	大和田	4.0 km 2.5 mi	O	|	|	|		Minuma-ku, Saitama	Saitama
TD05	Nanasato	七里	5.6 km 3.5 mi	O	|	|	|		Minuma-ku, Saitama	Saitama
TD06	Iwatsuki	岩槻	8.5 km 5.3 mi	O	O	O	O		Iwatsuki-ku, Saitama	Saitama
TD07	Higashi-Iwatsuki	東岩槻	10.9 km 6.8 mi	O	|	|	|		Iwatsuki-ku, Saitama	Saitama
TD08	Toyoharu	豊春	12.2 km 7.6 mi	O	|	|	|		Kasukabe	Saitama
TD09	Yagisaki	八木崎	14.1 km 8.8 mi	O	|	|	O		Kasukabe	Saitama
TD10	Kasukabe	春日部	15.2 km 9.4 mi	O	O	O	O	Tobu Skytree Line (TS27)	Kasukabe	Saitama
TD11	Fujino-ushijima	藤の牛島	17.8 km 11.1 mi	O	O	O	O		Kasukabe	Saitama
TD12	Minami-Sakurai	南桜井	20.6 km 12.8 mi	O	O	O	O		Kasukabe	Saitama
TD13	Kawama	川間	22.9 km 14.2 mi	O	O	O	O		Noda	Chiba
TD14	Nanakōdai	七光台	25.1 km 15.6 mi	O	O	O	O		Noda	Chiba
TD15	Shimizu-kōen	清水公園	26.6 km 16.5 mi	O	O	O	O		Noda	Chiba
TD16	Atago	愛宕	27.7 km 17.2 mi	O	O	O	O		Noda	Chiba
TD17	Nodashi	野田市	28.6 km 17.8 mi	O	O	O	O		Noda	Chiba
TD18	Umesato	梅郷	30.9 km 19.2 mi	O	O	O	O		Noda	Chiba
TD19	Unga	運河	33.2 km 20.6 mi	O	O	O	O		Nagareyama	Chiba
TD20	Edogawadai	江戸川台	35.1 km 21.8 mi	O	O	|	|		Nagareyama	Chiba
TD21	Hatsuishi	初石	36.8 km 22.9 mi	O	O	|	|		Nagareyama	Chiba
TD22	Nagareyama-ōtakanomori	流山おおたかの森	38.4 km 23.9 mi	O	O	O	O	Tsukuba Express (TX12)	Nagareyama	Chiba
TD23	Toyoshiki	豊四季	39.7 km 24.7 mi	O	O	|	|		Kashiwa	Chiba
TD24	Kashiwa	柏	42.9 km 26.7 mi	O	O	O	O	Jōban Line (Rapid) (JJ07); Jōban Line (Local) (JL28)	Kashiwa	Chiba
TD25	Shin-Kashiwa	新柏	45.8 km 28.5 mi	O		|			Kashiwa	Chiba
TD26	Masuo	増尾	47.1 km 29.3 mi	O		|			Kashiwa	Chiba
TD27	Sakasai	逆井	48.0 km 29.8 mi	O		|			Kashiwa	Chiba
TD28	Takayanagi	高柳	50.2 km 31.2 mi	O		O			Kashiwa	Chiba
TD29	Mutsumi	六実	51.9 km 32.2 mi	O		|			Matsudo	Chiba
TD30	Shin-Kamagaya	新鎌ヶ谷	53.3 km 33.1 mi	O		O		Matsudo Line (KS78); Hokusō Line (HS08); Narita Sky Access Line (HS08)	Kamagaya	Chiba
TD31	Kamagaya	鎌ヶ谷	55.2 km 34.3 mi	O		|			Kamagaya	Chiba
TD32	Magomezawa	馬込沢	57.7 km 35.9 mi	O		|			Funabashi	Chiba
TD33	Tsukada	塚田	60.1 km 37.3 mi	O		|			Funabashi	Chiba
TD34	Shin-Funabashi	新船橋	61.3 km 38.1 mi	O		|			Funabashi	Chiba
TD35	Funabashi	船橋	62.7 km 39.0 mi	O		O		Sōbu Line (JO25); Chūō–Sōbu Line (JB31); Main Line (Keisei Funabashi; KS22)	Funabashi	Chiba

== Rolling stock ==
- 8000 series 6-car (including 2+4-car) EMUs (since 3 June 1977)
- 10030/10050 series 6-car EMUs (since 20 April 2013)
- 60000 series 6-car EMUs (since 15 June 2013)
- 80000 series 5-car EMUs (since 8 March 2025)

Trains are formed of 6-car (or 4+2-car) 8000 series EMUs, introduced from 1997. New 6-car 60000 series EMUs were introduced on the line from 15 June 2013, replacing the older 8000 series sets. Eight sets are scheduled to be delivered by the end of fiscal 2013.

From 3 March 2012, test running using 10030 series EMUs commenced on the line, with the first reliveried set entering revenue service from 20 April 2013.

From 21 April 2017, new Tobu 500 series three-car EMUs operate on Urban Park Liner limited express services on the line. Services operate between Asakusa in Tokyo (Tobu Skytree Line) and Omiya and Nodashi on the Tobu Urban Park Line, with trains dividing and joining at Kasukabe. The 500 series trains are also used on Urban Park Liner services operating between Omiya and Unga on the Tobu Urban Park Line.

Tobu Railway announced on 16 April 2024 that 25 80000 series 5-car sets would be introduced on the line, replacing all remaining 8000 and 10000 series trains in service on the Urban Park Line. In addition, the 18 60000 series sets are expected to be shortened to 5 cars per trainset with one surplus car from each set slated to be modified and incorporated into 18 of the 80000 series sets.

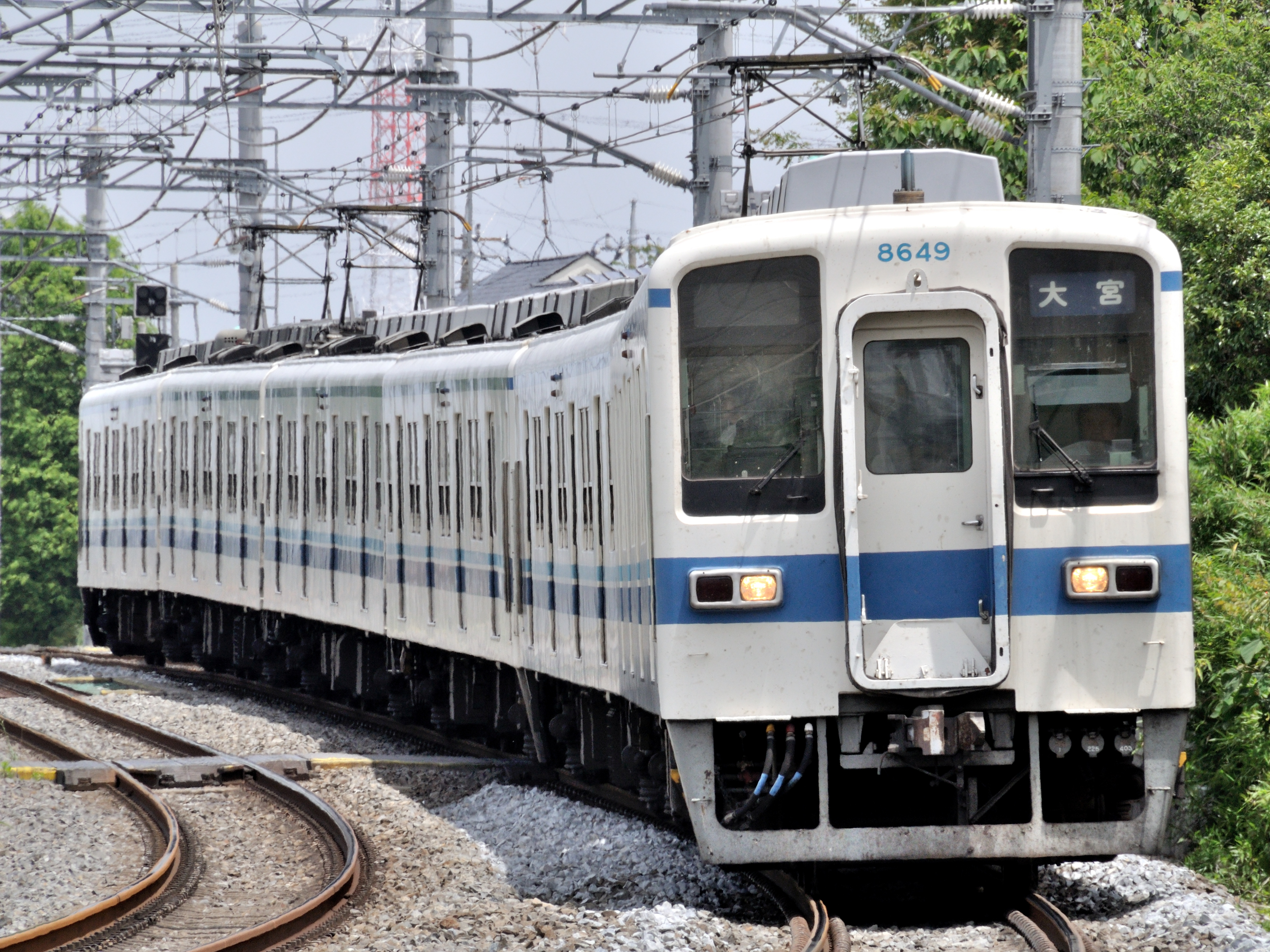
A 6-car 8000 series in June 2013

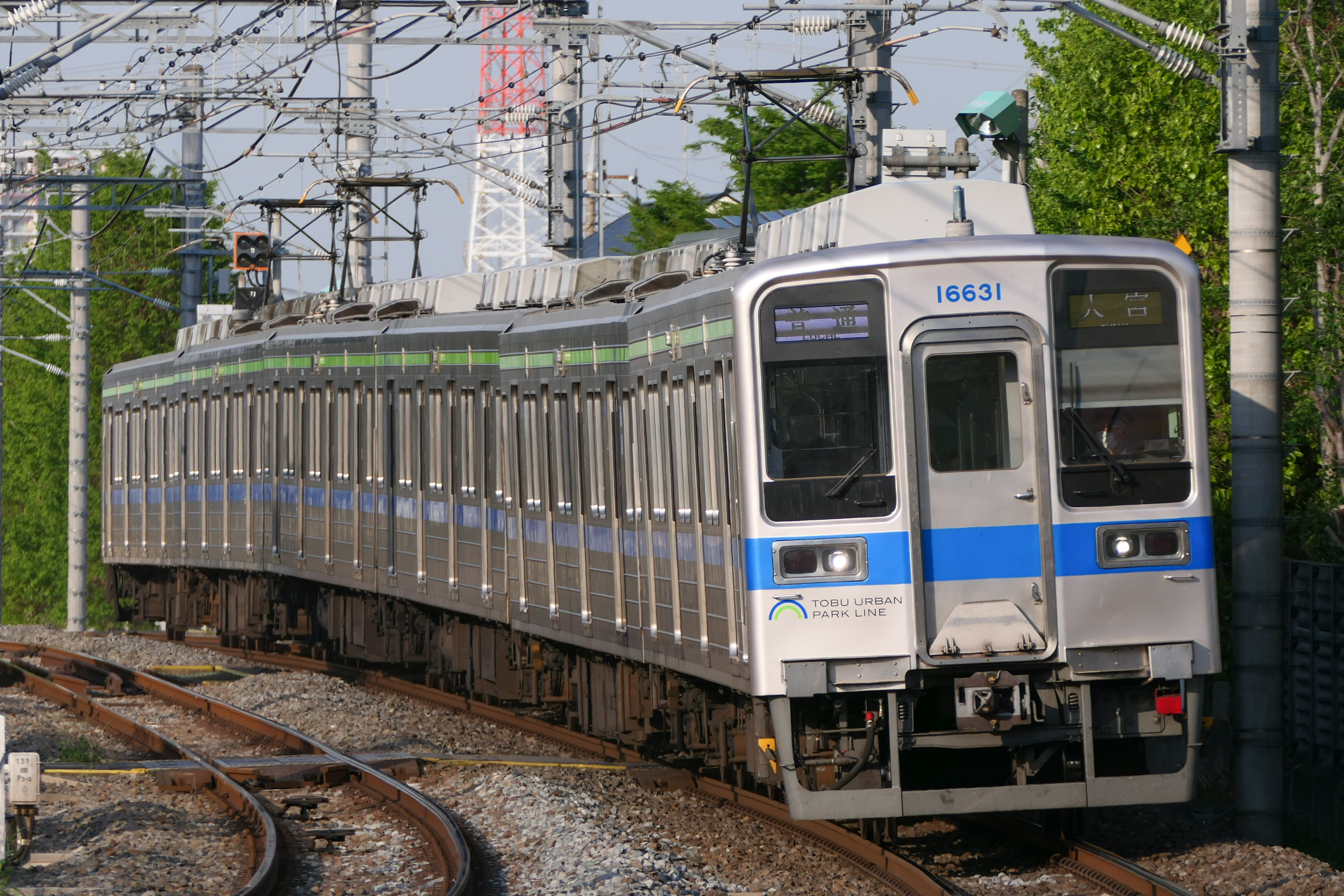
10030 series 6-car set 11631 in new colour scheme and Urban Park Line branding in April 2021

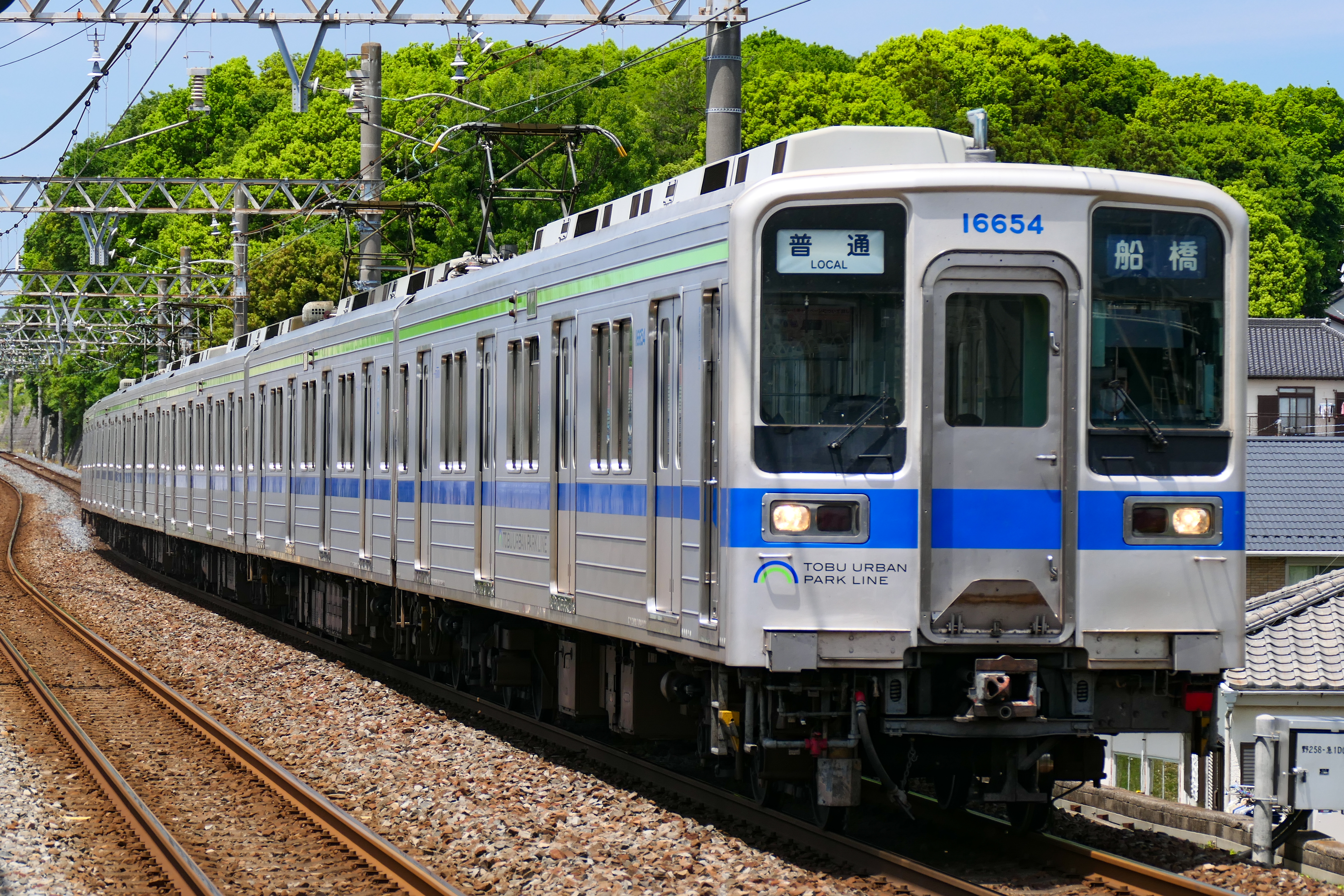
10050 series 6-car set 11654 in new colour scheme and Urban Park Line branding in May 2022

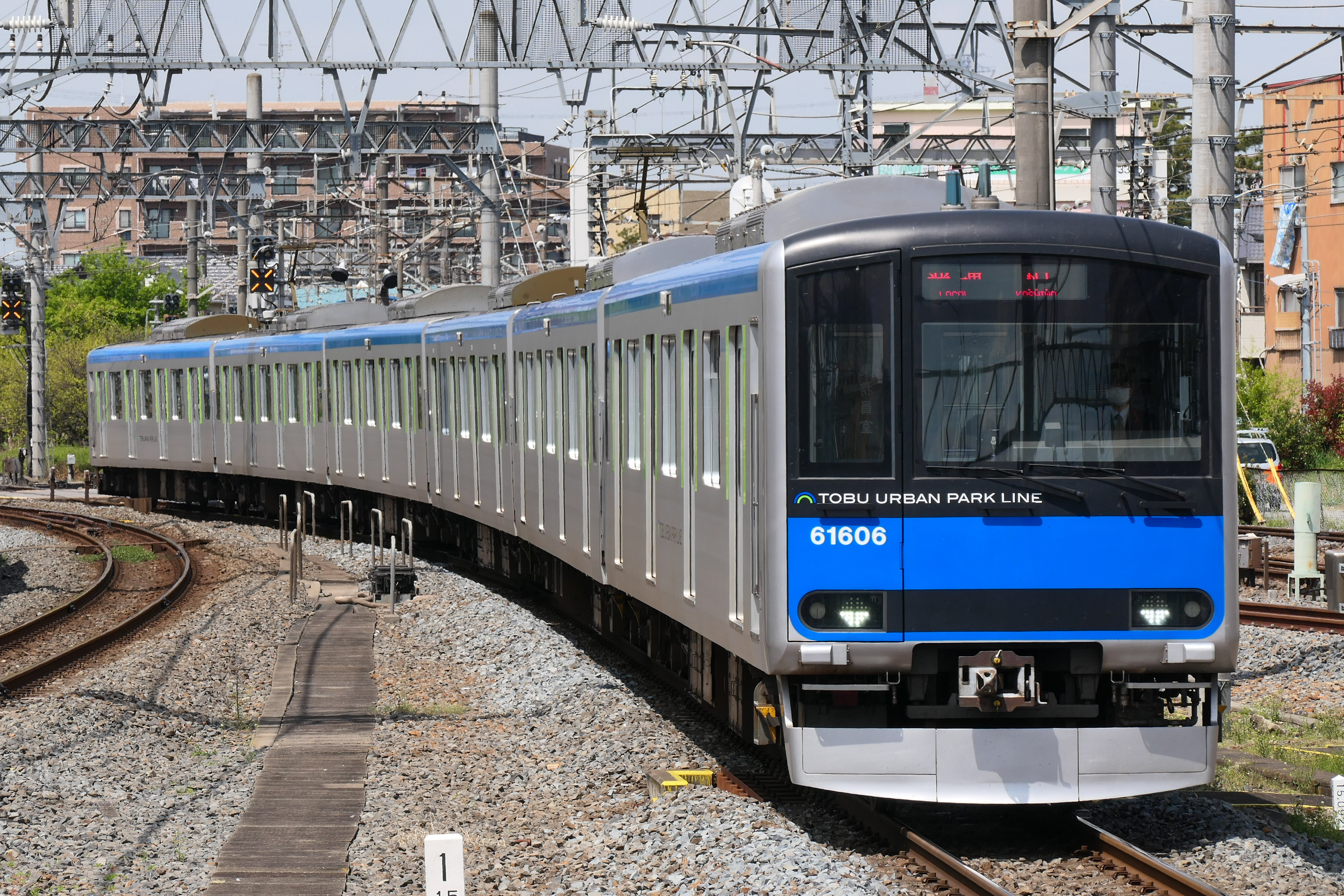
A 6-car 60000 series in April 2021

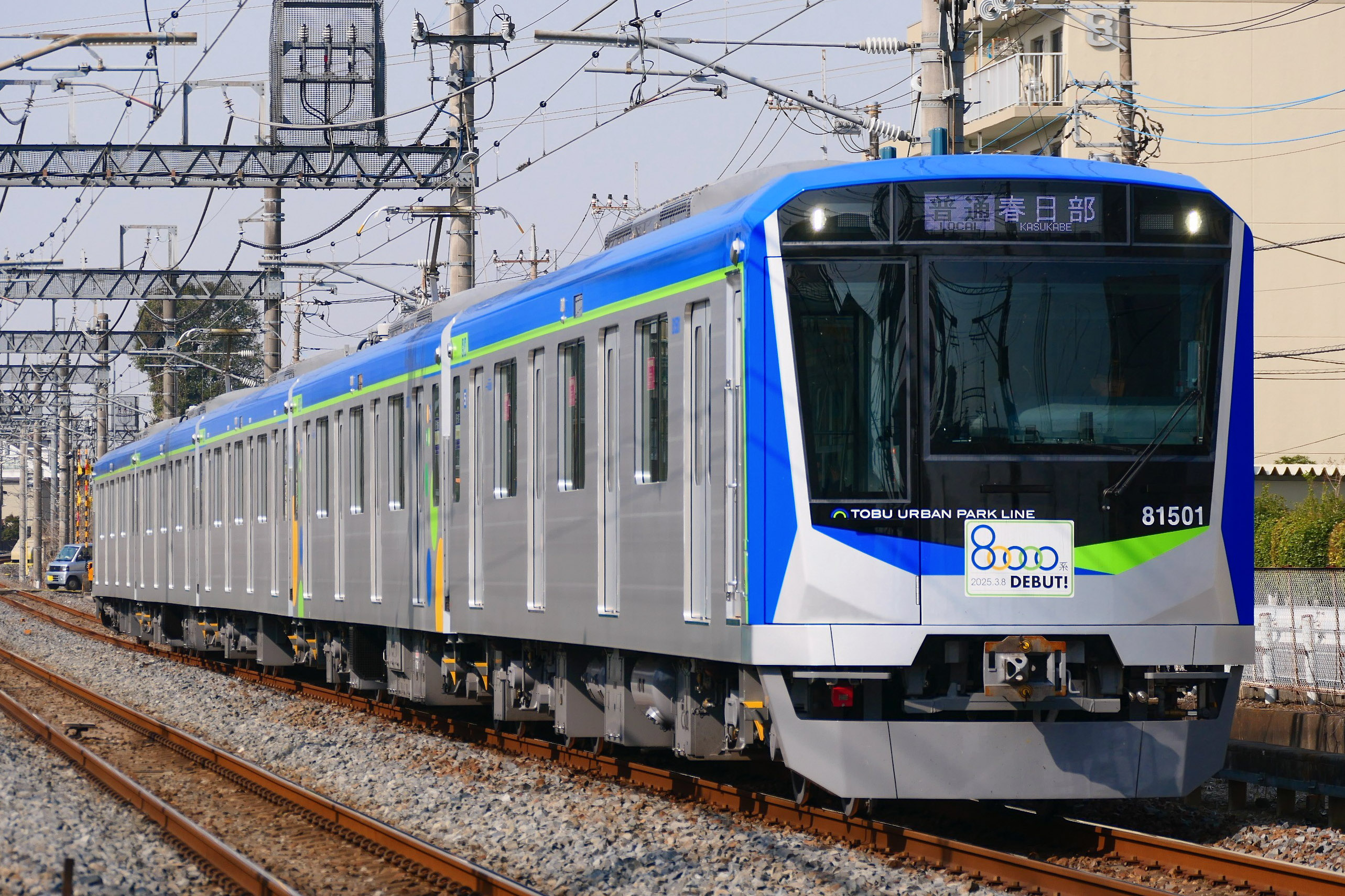
A 5-car 80000 series in March 2025

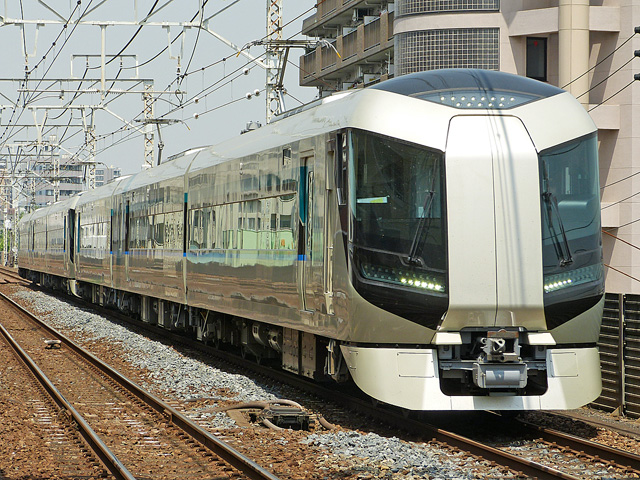
A 500 series EMU in May 2017

=== Former rolling stock ===
- 1000 series 16 m long electric cars (1001–1004, 1101–1104,1201–1202), built in 1929 by Nippon Sharyo
- 6300 series 20 m long electric cars (former JNR 63000 series), from March 1947 until 1950
- 3200 series
- 7800 series 20 m long electric cars, from February 1958
- 7300 series 20 m long electric cars (rebuilt from 6300 series), from 1963
- 3000 series 6-car (including 2+4-car) EMUs, rebuilt from 3200 series, from May 1965 until 1992
- 5400 series EMUs, from November 1967 until 1972
- 3050 series EMUs, rebuilt from 5400 series, from March 1971 until 1992
- 3070 series EMUs, rebuilt from 5300 series, from 1974 until 1992
- 5000 series 6-car (including 2+4-car) EMUs, rebuilt from 7800 series, from March 1983 until November 1994
- 2080 series 6-car EMUs x2, from May 1988 until November 1992
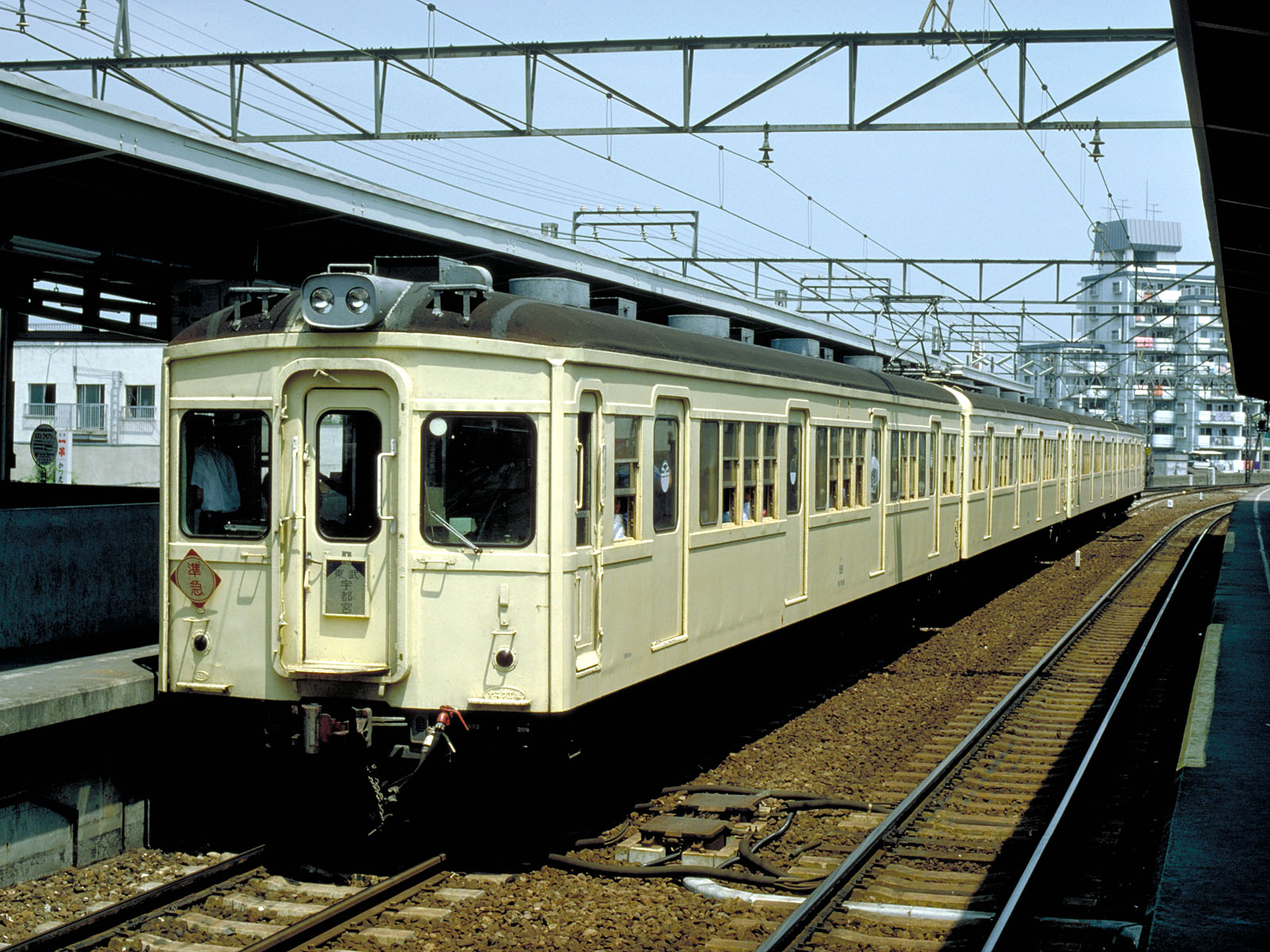
7800 series

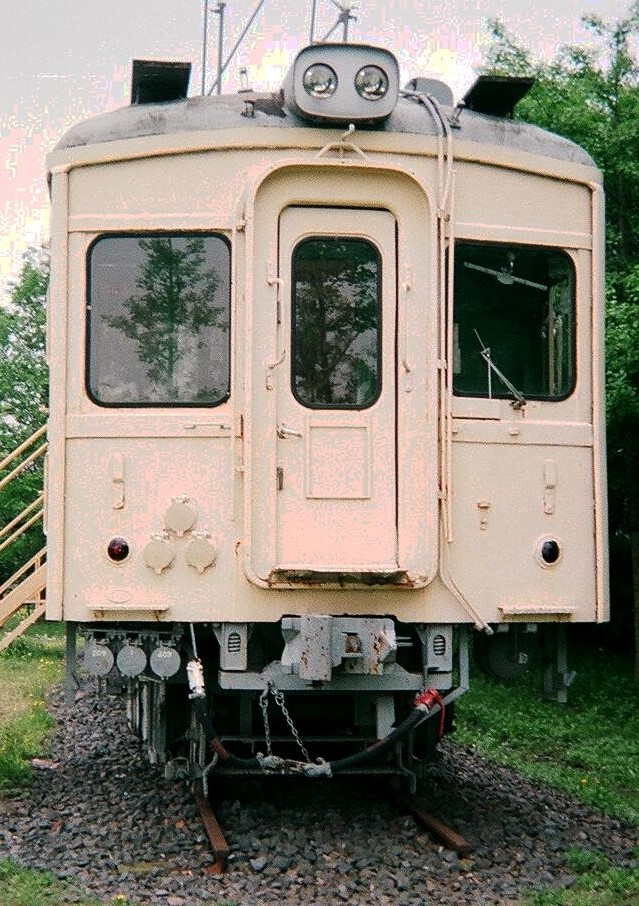
7300 series

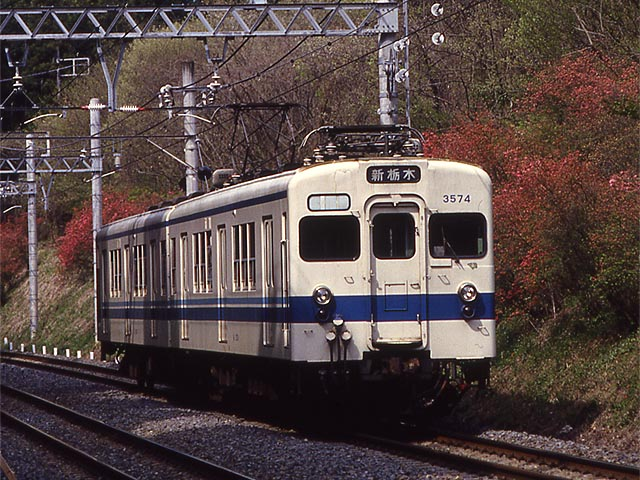
3070 series

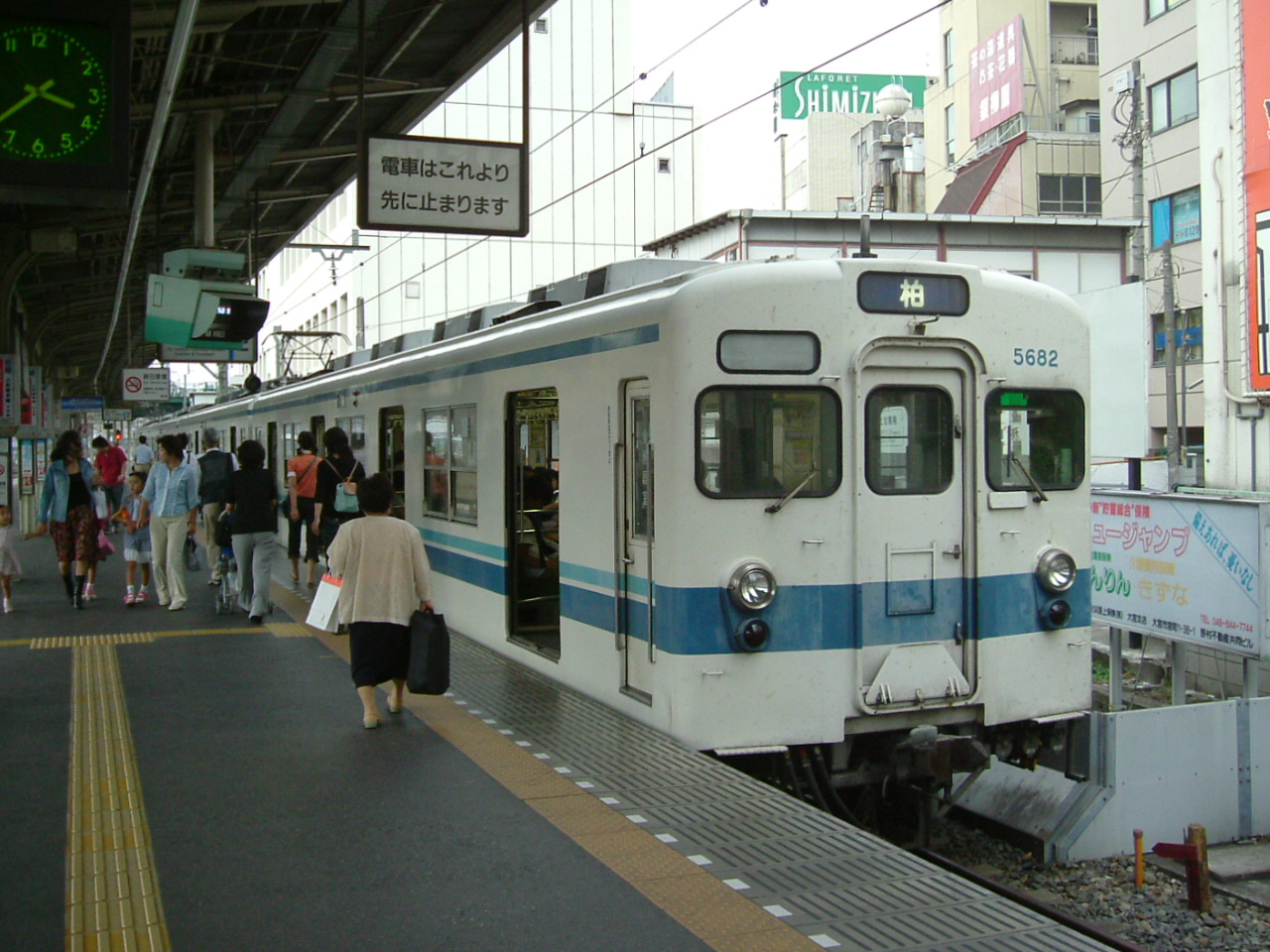
A Noda Line 5070 series in September 2004

== History ==
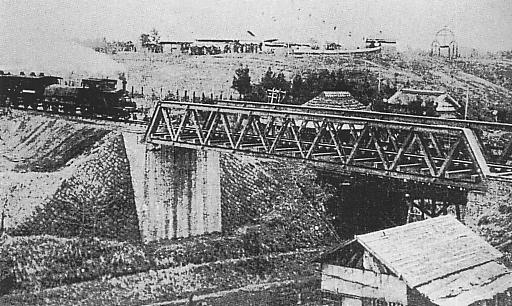
The Chiba Prefectural Railway Noda Line

The line first opened as the Chiba Prefectural Railway Noda Line (千葉県営鉄道野田線, Chiba Ken'ei Tetsudō Noda-sen) on 9 May 1911, from Kashiwa to Nodamachi (now Nodashi), a distance of 14.7 kilometres (9 miles 10 chains) using steam haulage. In 1923, the line was privatized and the operator was named Hokusō Railway (北総鉄道, Hokusō Tetsudō) (separate from the present Hokusō Railway), and also opened its own line from Funabashi Station to Kashiwa Station, a distance of 19.6 km (12 mi 14 ch).

The company gradually extended the line to Ōmiya, and changed its name in 1929 to Sōbu Railway (総武鉄道, Sōbu Tetsudō) (not to be confused with the present Sōbu Main Line). The line was completed in 1930 with the completion of the bridge over the Edo River.

On 1 March 1944, the company merged with the Tobu Railway, and the line became the Tobu Noda Line. 6-car trains were introduced from November 1972.

Electrification was commenced in 1929 between Kasukabe and Ōmiya, and while the section from Kashiwa to Funabashi was still unelectrified when the operation of the line was taken over by Tobu in 1944, the remaining section was electrified by 1 March 1947.

The Omiya to Kasukabe section was double-tracked between 1957 and 2011, the Nodashi to Umesato section in 2011, the Unga to Sakasai section between 1960 and 1991, and the Mutsumi to Funabashi section between 1964 and 1999.

Six-car 8000 series EMUs were phased in from 1997, displaced by new 30000 series EMUs introduced on the Tobu Isesaki Line. The last remaining 5070 series EMUs were withdrawn from the start of the revised timetable on 19 October 2004, and the line's maximum speed was raised from 90 km/h to 100 km/h at the same time.

From 17 March 2012, station numbering was introduced on all Tobu lines, with Noda Line stations receiving numbers prefixed with the letters "TD".

From 1 April 2014, the line was given the nickname "Tobu Urban Park Line" (東武アーバンパークライン).

== See also ==
- List of railway lines in Japan
