= Kaichi International University =

Private university in Chiba, Japan

Coordinates: 35°51′45.37″N 139°59′20.35″E

- 開智国際大学; Kaichi kokusai daigaku
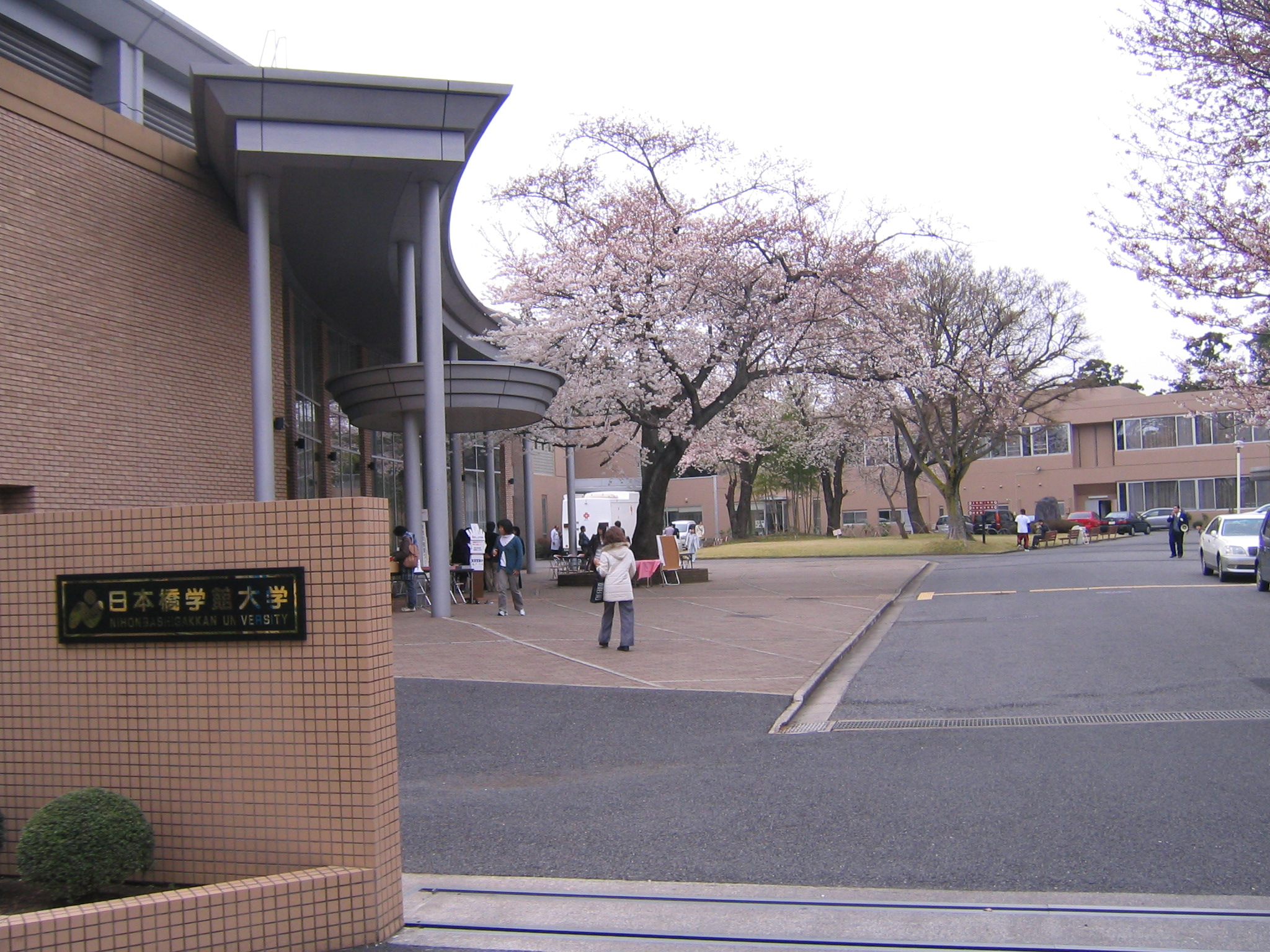
- Type: Private
- Established: 1904
- Location: Kashiwa, Chiba, Japan
- Website: Official website

Kaichi International University (開智国際大学, Kaichi kokusai daigaku) is a private university in Kashiwa, Chiba, Japan. The predecessor of the school was founded in 1904, and it was chartered as a junior college in 1987. In 2000 it became a four-year university. In 2015, the university was renamed the Kaichi International University from Nihonbashi Gakkan University (日本橋学館大学, Nihonbashi gakkan daigaku).
