= Minami-Kashiwa Station =

Railway station in Kashiwa, Chiba Prefecture, Japan

JL27 Minami-Kashiwa Station 南柏駅
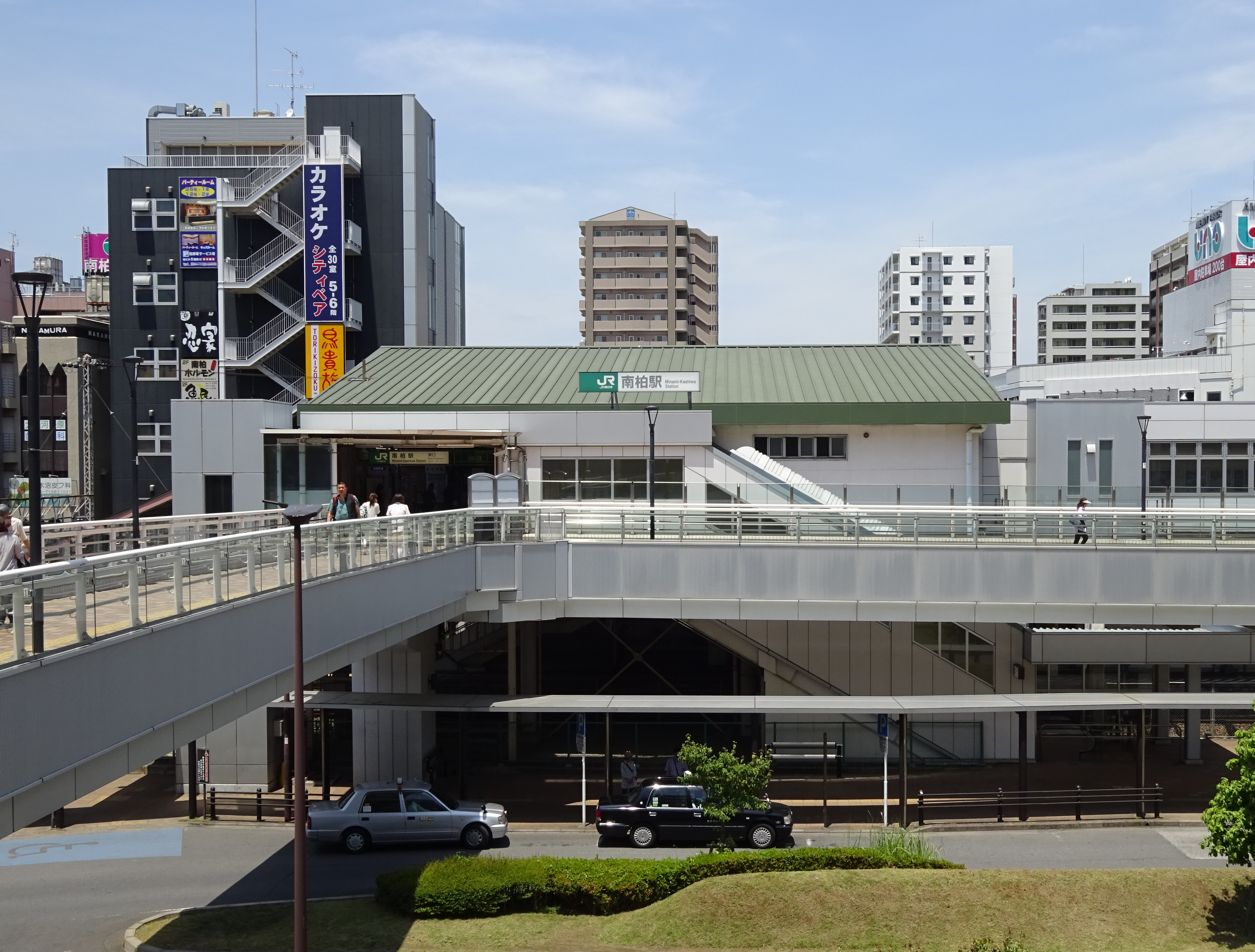
- Minami-Kashiwa Station, June 2016

General information
- Location: 1-1-1 Minamikashiwa, Kashiwa-shi, Chiba-ken 277-0075; Japan
- Coordinates: 35.8445°N 139.9540°E
- Operator: JR East
- Line: Jōban Line (Local)
- Distance: 24.5 km from Nippori
- Platforms: 1 island platform

Other information
- Status: Staffed
- Station code: JL27
- Website: www.jreast.co.jp/estation/station/info.aspx?StationCd=1479

History
- Opened: October 1, 1953

Passengers
- FY2019: 32,930 daily

Services
Preceding station	JR East	Following station
Kita-Kogane JL26 towards Ayase	Jōban Line (Local) Local-Kankō	Kashiwa JL28 towards Toride
Location
- Location within Chiba Prefecture Location within Japan

Minami-Kashiwa Station (南柏駅, Minamikashiwa-eki) is a passenger railway station in the city of Kashiwa, Chiba, Japan, operated by East Japan Railway Company (JR East).

== Lines ==
Minami-Kashiwa Station is served by the Jōban Line from Ueno in Tokyo and is 24.5 km from the terminus of the line at Nippori Station in Tokyo.

== Station layout ==
The station is an elevated station with a single island platform serving two tracks. The station is staffed.

=== Platforms ===
1	Jōban Line (Local)	for Kashiwa, Abiko, and Toride
2	Jōban Line (Local)	for Matsudo, Ayase; Tokyo Metro Chiyoda Line for Kita-senju, Nishi-nippori and Yoyogi-uehara

== History ==
Minami-Kashiwa Station was opened on October 1, 1953, as a station on the Japan National Railways (JNR). A new elevated station building was completed in December 1971. Minami-Kashiwa Station was absorbed into the JR East network upon the privatization of the JNR on April 1, 1987.

== Passenger statistics ==
In fiscal 2019, the station was used by an average of 32,930 passengers daily.

== Surrounding area ==
- National Route 6
- Kashiwa Municipal Yutaka Elementary School
- Nagareyama Municipal Mukaikogane Elementary School

== See also ==
- List of railway stations in Japan
