= Takayanagi Station =

Railway station in Kashiwa, Chiba Prefecture, Japan

TD28 Takayanagi Station 高柳駅
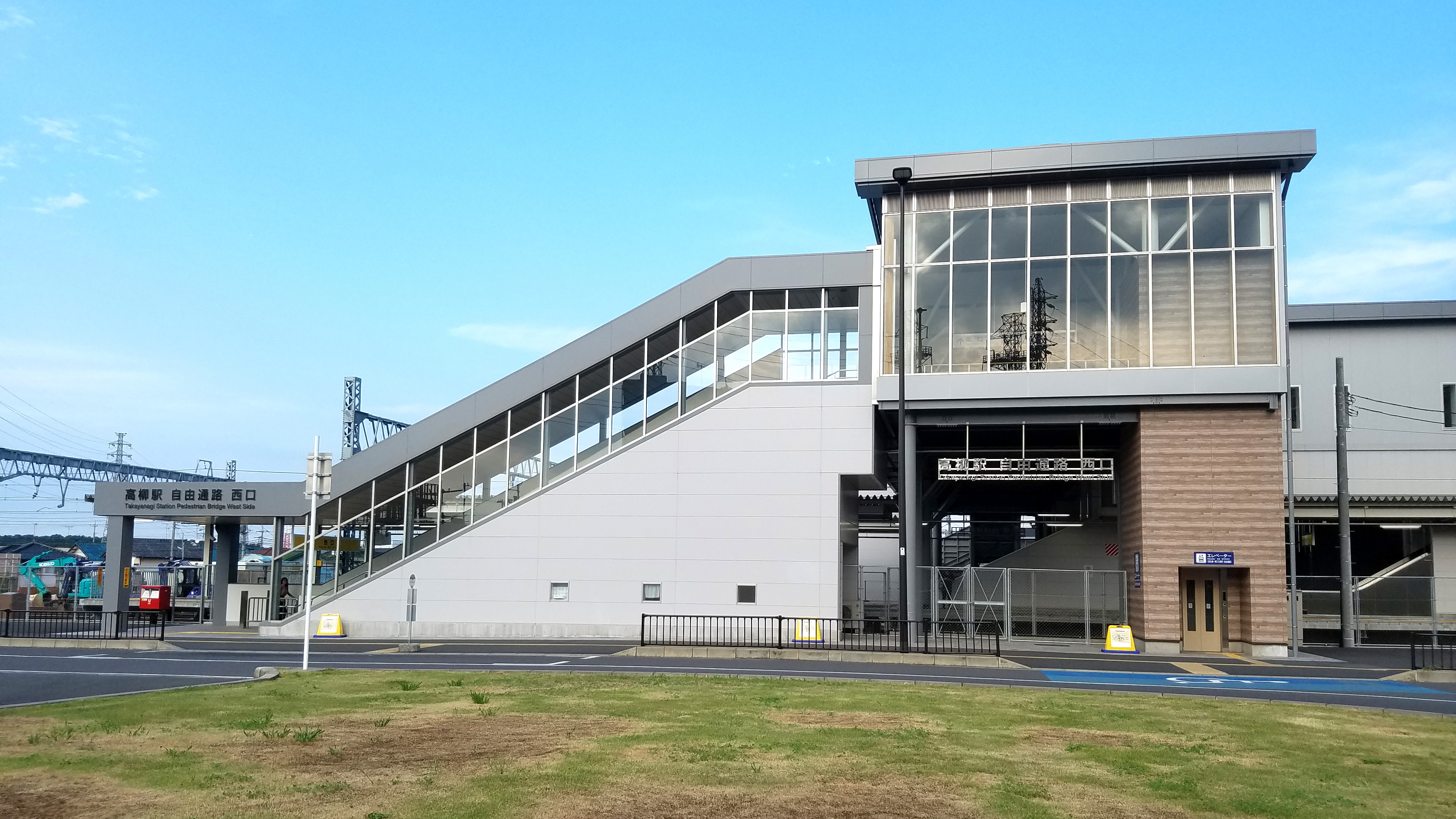
- Takayanagi Station in September 2019

General information
- Location: 1489 Takayanagi, Kashiwa-shi, Chiba-ken 277-0941; Japan
- Coordinates: 35.8083°N 139.9986°E
- Operator: Tobu Railway
- Line: Tobu Urban Park Line
- Distance: 52.0 km from Ōmiya
- Platforms: 2 island platforms

Construction
- Structure type: At grade

Other information
- Station code: TD-28
- Website: Official website

History
- Opened: 27 December 1923; 102 years ago

Passengers
- FY2019: 14,701 daily

Services
Preceding station	Tobu Railway	Following station
Kashiwa TD24 towards Ōmiya	Tōbu Urban Park Line Express	Shin-Kamagaya TD30 towards Funabashi
Sakasai TD27 towards Ōmiya	Tōbu Urban Park Line Local	Mutsumi TD29 towards Funabashi
Location
- Location within Chiba Prefecture Location within Japan

Takayanagi Station (高柳駅, Takayanagi-eki) is a passenger railway station in the city of Kashiwa, Chiba, Japan, operated by the private railway operator Tōbu Railway. The station is numbered "TD-28".

== Lines ==
Takayanagi Station is served by the Tōbu Urban Park Line (also known as the Tōbu Noda Line), and lies 50.2 km (31.2 mi) from the western terminus of the line at Ōmiya Station.

== Station layout ==
The station consists of two island platforms connected by a footbridge. Originally, these platforms were side platforms, but they were converted to island platforms, with construction occurring between 2016 and 2020.

=== Platforms ===
1-2	Tobu Urban Park Line	for Mutsumi, Shin-Kamagaya, and Funabashi
3-4	Tobu Urban Park Line	for Kashiwa, Nodashi, Kasukabe, and Ōmiya

== History ==
The station opened on 27 December 1923. From 17 March 2012, station numbering was introduced on all Tobu lines, with Takayanagi Station becoming "TD-28".

== Passenger statistics ==
In fiscal 2019, the station was used by an average of 14,701 passengers daily.

== Surrounding area ==
- JMSDF Shimofusa Air Base

== See also ==
- List of railway stations in Japan
