= Tobu 2000 series =

Japanese train type

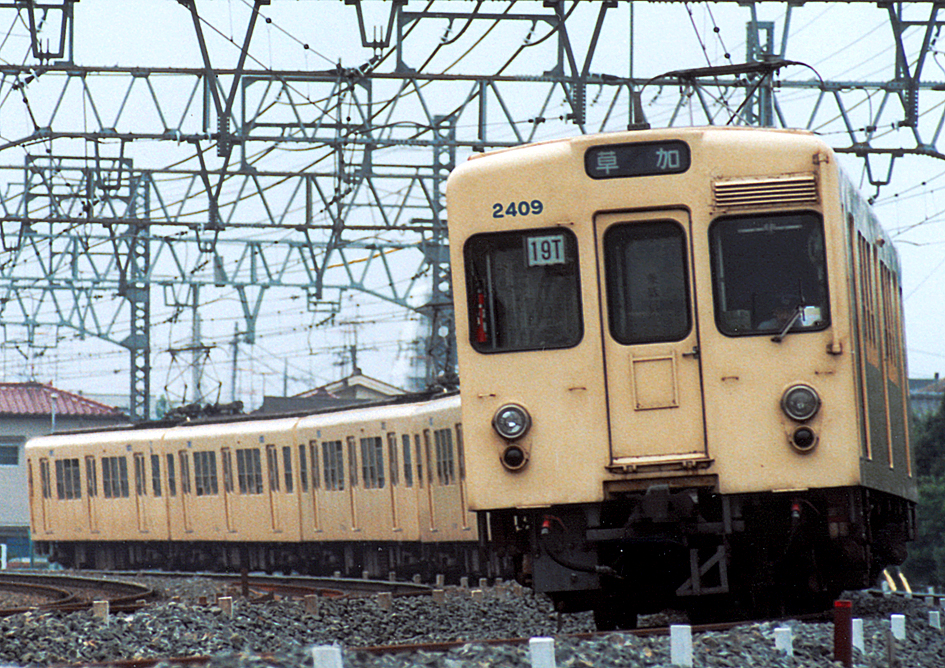
- 2000 series set 2109 on the Isesaki Line in 1988
- In service: 1961–1993
- Number built: 160 vehicles (20 sets)
- Number scrapped: 160 vehicles
- Formation: 4/6/8 cars per trainset
- Fleet numbers: 2101-2120, 2181-2182
- Operator: Tobu Railway
- Depot: Kasukabe
- Lines served: Tobu Isesaki Line, Tokyo Metro Hibiya Line, Tobu Noda Line

Specifications
- Car body construction: Steel
- Car length: 18,000 mm (59 ft 1 in)
- Width: 2,800 mm (9 ft 2 in)
- Height: 3,995 mm (13 ft 1.3 in)
- Doors: Sliding, 3 pairs per side
- Power output: 75 kW x 4 per car
- Electric systems: 1,500 V DC overhead catenary
- Current collection: Pantograph
- Track gauge: 1,067 mm (3 ft 6 in)

The Tobu 2000 series (東武2000系, Tōbu 2000-kei) was a DC electric multiple unit (EMU) commuter train type operated by the private railway operator Tobu Railway in Japan between 1961 and 1993.

Originally built for use on inter-running services between the Tobu Isesaki Line and Tokyo Metro Hibiya Line, two sets were later rebuilt for use on the Tobu Noda Line.

== Variants ==
- 2000 series: 4-car, 6-car, and ultimately 8-car sets used on Tobu Isesaki Line and Tokyo Metro Hibiya Line inter-running services
- 2080 series: Two 6-car sets rebuilt from 2000 series cars in 1988 for use on the Tobu Noda Line
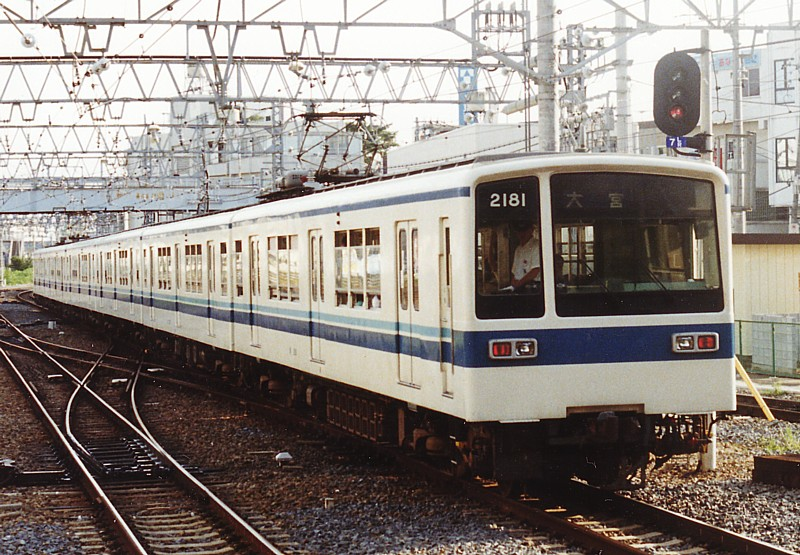
Noda Line 2080 series set 2181 in 1992

== History ==
Ten four-car sets were introduced from 1961 on inter-running services between the Tobu Isesaki Line and Tokyo Metro Hibiya Line. These were lengthened to six cars per set in 1964 to cope with increased ridership, and ten more six-car sets were delivered between May 1966 and September 1970. The fleet was increased to eight cars per set from May 1972.

Two six-car sets were rebuilt from 2000 series cars in 1988 with new cab fronts for use on the Tobu Noda Line, and reclassified 2080 series. These two sets were withdrawn in 1992.

The last remaining 2000 series sets were withdrawn in 1993.

None of the Tobu 2000 Series cars were preserved.

== Formations ==
=== 2000 series ===
The eight-car sets (2101 to 2120) were formed as follows.

Designation	Mc	M'	M	M'	M	M'	M	M'c
Numbering	21xx	22xx	23xx	22xx	25xx	26xx	23xx	24xx

The "M" and "Mc" cars were each fitted with one lozenge-type pantograph.

=== 2080 series ===
The two six-car 2080 series sets (2181 and 2182) were formed as follows.

Designation	Mc	M	T	T	M	Mc
Numbering	218x	228x	238x	248x	258x	268x

The 2180 and 2580 cars each had one lozenge-type pantograph.

== Conversion and renumbering details ==
The former identities of the 2080 series cars were as shown below.

Set No.	Car No.	Original number
2181	KuMoHa 2181	MoHa 2560
2181	MoHa 2281	MoHa 2663
2181	SaHa 2381	MoHa 2556
2181	SaHa 2481	MoHa 2656
2181	MoHa 2581	MoHa 2563
2181	KuMoHa 2681	MoHa 2660
2182	KuMoHa 2182	MoHa 2552
2182	MoHa 2282	MoHa 2651
2182	SaHa 2382	MoHa 2558
2182	SaHa 2482	MoHa 2658
2182	MoHa 2582	MoHa 2551
2182	KuMoHa 2682	MoHa 2652
