= Kashiwa Station =

Railway station in Kashiwa, Chiba Prefecture, Japan

Kashiwa Station 柏駅
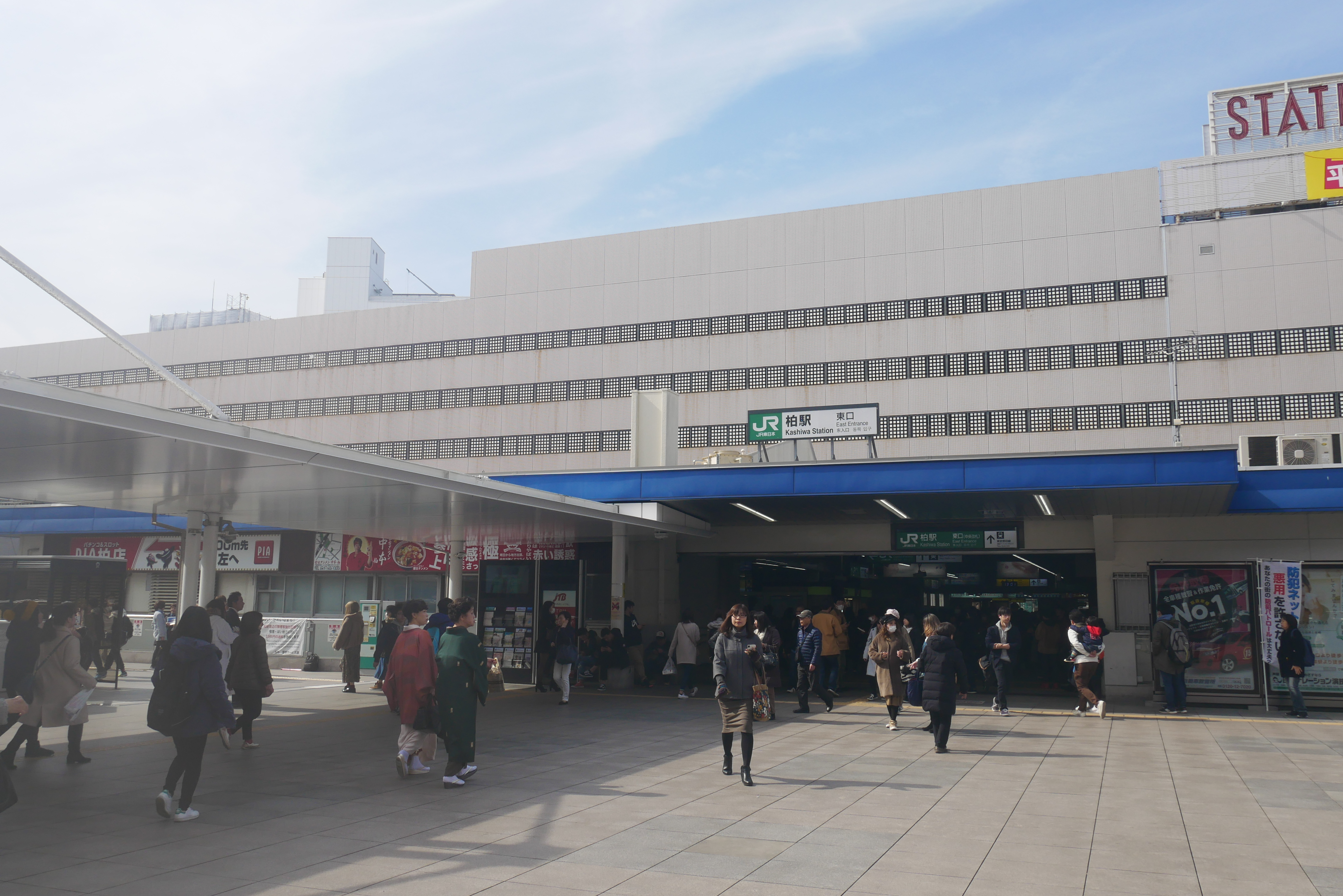
- JR East Kashiwa Station February 2019

General information
- Location: 1-1-1 Kashiwa, Kashiwa City, Chiba Prefecture 277-0005; Japan
- Coordinates: 35.8623°N 139.9713°E
- Operator: JR East; Tobu Railway
- Lines: ■ Jōban Line; Tobu Urban Park Line
Location
- Location within Chiba Prefecture Location within Kanto Area Location within Japan

Kashiwa Station (柏駅, Kashiwa-eki) is an interchange passenger railway station in the city of Kashiwa, Chiba, Japan, jointly operated by East Japan Railway Company (JR East) and the private railway operator Tōbu Railway.

== Lines ==
Kashiwa Station is served by the JR East Jōban Line from Ueno in Tokyo, and is 26.9 kilometers from the official starting point of that line at Nippori Station. It is also served by the radial Tobu Urban Park Line (also known as the Tōbu Noda Line) from Ōmiya in Saitama Prefecture to Funabashi in Chiba Prefecture. It lies 42.9 km (26.7 mi) from the western terminus of the Tōbu Noda Line at Ōmiya.

=== JR East ===
JJ07 JL28 Kashiwa Station 柏駅
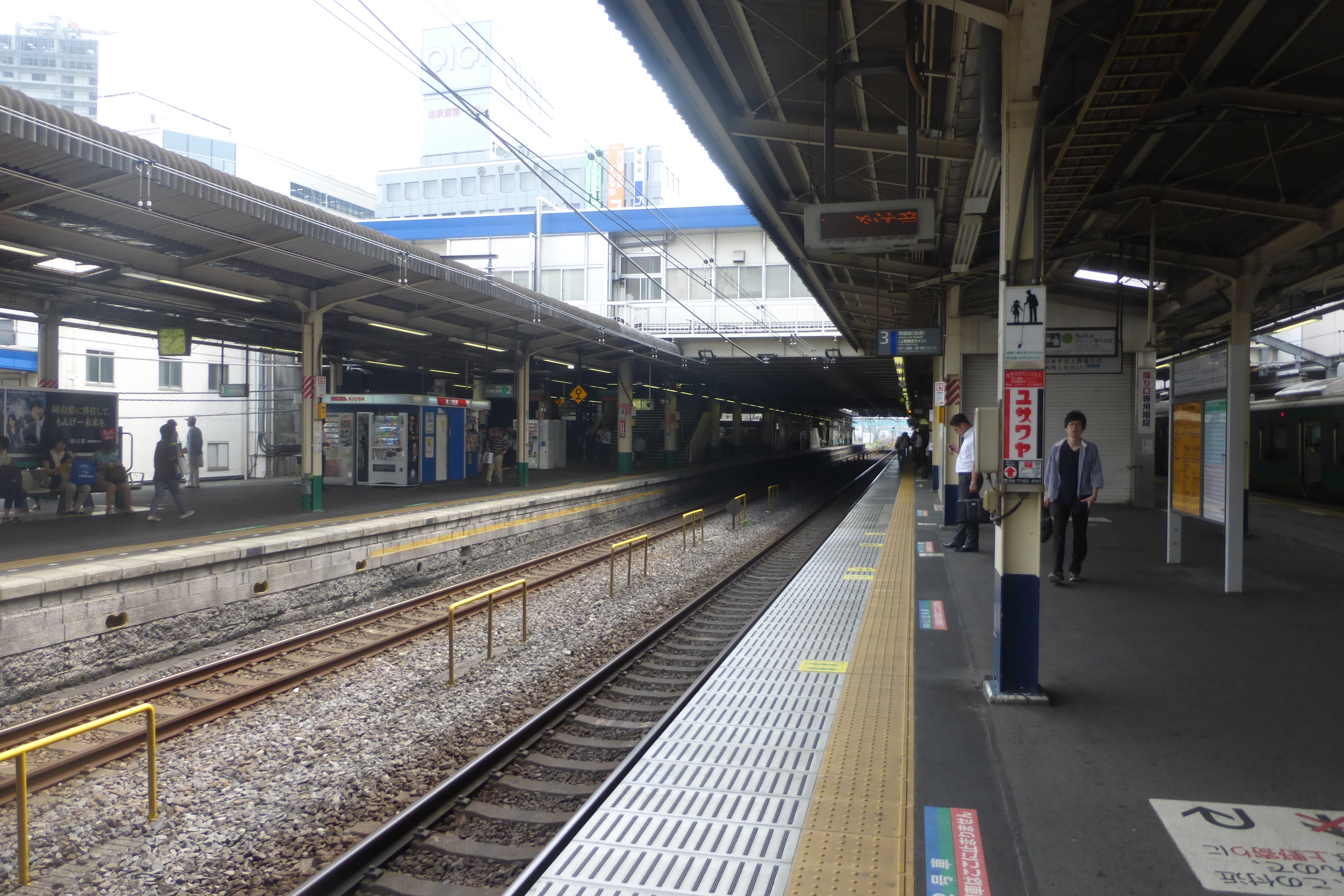
- The Joban Line (Rapid) platform 3 in July 2015

General information
- Location: 1-1-1 Kashiwa, Kashiwa City, Chiba Prefecture 277-0005; Japan
- Operator: JR East
- Lines: Jōban Line (Rapid); Jōban Line (Local)
- Platforms: 2 island platforms
- Tracks: 4

Construction
- Structure type: At grade

Other information
- Station code: JJ07 / JL28

History
- Opened: 25 December 1896; 129 years ago

Passengers
- FY2019: 125,490

Services
Preceding station	JR East	Following station
Ueno towards Shinagawa	Hitachi (limited service)	Tsuchiura (limited service) towards Sendai
Nippori (limited service) towards Shinagawa	Tokiwa	Ryūgasakishi towards Takahagi
Matsudo JJ06 towards Shinagawa	Jōban Line Special Rapid	Toride JJ10 towards Tsuchiura
Matsudo JJ06 towards Shinagawa	Jōban Line (Rapid) Rapid	Abiko JJ08 towards Toride
Matsudo JJ06 towards Shinagawa	Jōban Line Local-Futsuu	Abiko JJ08 towards Sendai
Minami-Kashiwa JL27 towards Ayase	Jōban Line (Local) Local-Kankō	Kita-Kashiwa JL29 towards Toride
Location

The JR East portion of the station has a Midori no Madoguchi staffed ticket office. There are two island platforms serving four tracks, with an elevated station building located above the platforms.

==== Platforms ====
1	Jōban Line (Local)	for Shim-Matsudo, and Ayase; Tokyo Metro Chiyoda Line for Yoyogi-Uehara
2	Jōban Line (Local)	for Kita-Kashiwa, Abiko, and Toride
3	Jōban Line (Rapid)	for Matsudo, Nippori, Ueno; Ueno-Tokyo Line for Tokyo and Shinagawa
4	Jōban Line (Rapid)	for Abiko, Toride, Tsuchiura, Ishioka, Mito and Iwaki ■ Narita Line for Narita (via Abiko)

=== Tōbu ===
TD24 Kashiwa Station 柏駅
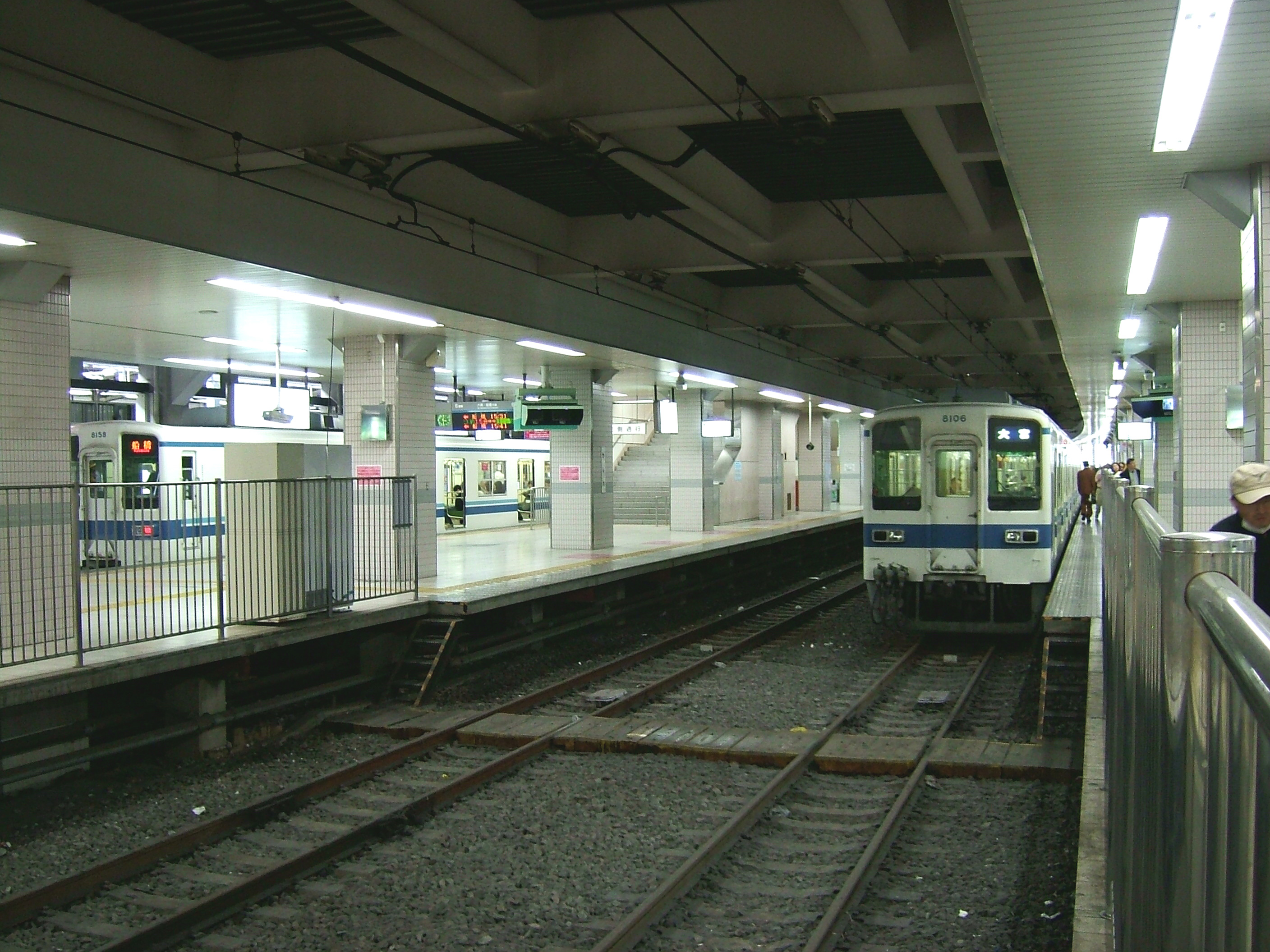
- Tobu Kashiwa platforms, April 2007

General information
- Location: 1-1 Suehiro-cho, Kashiwa-shi, Chiba; Japan
- System: Tobu Station
- Operator: Tōbu Railway
- Line: Tobu Urban Park Line
- Platforms: 2 bay platforms

Other information
- Station code: TD-24

History
- Opened: 9 May 1911

Passengers
- FY2019: 147,553 daily
Services
Preceding station	Tobu Railway	Following station
Nagareyama-ōtakanomori TD22 towards Ōmiya	Urban Park Liner	Terminus
Nagareyama-ōtakanomori TD22 One-way operation	Urban Park Liner from Asakusa	Terminus
Nagareyama-ōtakanomori TD22 towards Ōmiya	Tōbu Urban Park Line Express	Takayanagi TD28 towards Funabashi
Toyoshiki TD23 towards Ōmiya	Tōbu Urban Park Line Section Express	Terminus
Toyoshiki TD23 towards Ōmiya	Tōbu Urban Park Line Local	Shin-Kashiwa TD25 towards Funabashi
Location

The Tōbu station has two bay platforms serving four tracks. All trains reverse at this station. The station building is elevated and located above the platforms. It is connected to the JR station by a concourse on the second floor.

==== Platforms ====
Track layout for Tōbu Kashiwa Station

1/2	Tōbu Urban Park Line	for Unga, Nodashi, Kasukabe, and Ōmiya
3/4	Tōbu Urban Park Line	for Mutsumi, Shin-Kamagaya, and Funabashi

== History ==
The present-day JR East station opened on 25 December 1896. The Tobu station opened on 9 May 1911. The station was absorbed into the JR East network upon the privatization of JNR on 1 April 1987. In July 1998, the platforms for the Jōban Line were lengthened by three meters. The South Exit to the station was opened on 8 April 1999.

From 17 March 2012, station numbering was introduced on all Tōbu lines, with Kashiwa Station becoming "TD-24".

== Passenger statistics ==
In fiscal 2019, the JR portion of the station was used by an average of 125,490 passengers daily, making it the 27th busiest on the JR East network.

In fiscal 2019, the Tobu station was used by an average of 147,553 passengers daily (entering and exiting passengers). The average daily passenger figures for each operator in previous years are as shown below.

Fiscal year	JR East	Tobu
2000	149,376	
2005	135,074	
2010	119,825	
2011	118,611	136,499
2012	119,064	138,686
2013	121,061	

== Surrounding area ==
- Kashiwa City Office
- Chiba Prefectural Higashi Katsushika High School
- Kashiwa Junior High School

== See also ==
- List of railway stations in Japan
