= Mutsumi Station =

Railway station in Matsudo, Chiba Prefecture, Japan

TD29 Mutsumi Station 六実駅
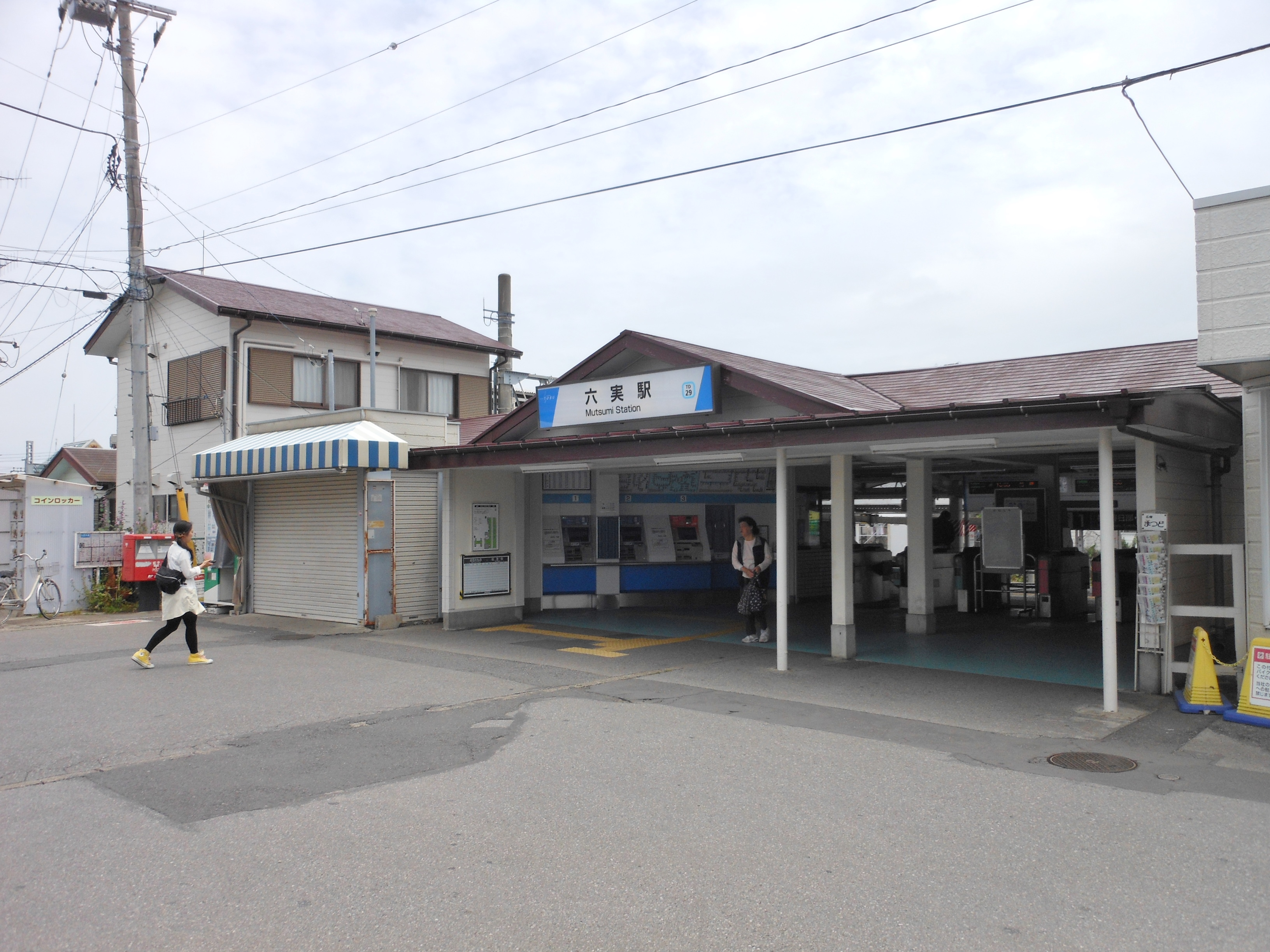
- Mutsumi Station, June 2013

General information
- Location: 4-6-1 Mutsumi, Matsudo-shi, Chiba-ken 270-2204; Japan
- Coordinates: 35.7937°N 139.9990°E
- Operator: Tobu Railway
- Line: Tobu Urban Park Line
- Platforms: 2 side platforms

Other information
- Station code: TD-29
- Website: Official website

History
- Opened: 27 December 1923; 102 years ago

Passengers
- FY2019: 15,840 daily

Services
| Preceding station | Tobu Railway | Following station |
|---|---|---|
| Takayanagi TD28 towards Ōmiya | Tōbu Urban Park Line Local | Shin-Kamagaya TD30 towards Funabashi |
Location
- Location within Chiba Prefecture Location within Japan

Mutsumi Station (六実駅, Mutsumi-eki) is a passenger railway station in the city of Matsudo, Chiba, Japan, operated by the private railway operator Tōbu Railway. The station is numbered "TD-29".

== Lines ==
Mutsumi Station is served by Tobu Urban Park Line (also known as the Tobu Noda Line), and lies 51.9 km (32.2 mi) from the western terminus of the line at Ōmiya Station.

== Station layout ==
The station consists of one island platform and one side platform serving three tracks, connected to the station building by a footbridge.

=== Platforms ===
| 1 | ■ Tobu Urban Park Line | for Kashiwa, Nodashi, Kasukabe, and Ōmiya |
| 2, 3 | ■ Tobu Urban Park Line | for Shin-Kamagaya and Funabashi |

== History ==
The station opened on 27 December 1923. From 17 March 2012, station numbering was introduced on all Tobu lines, with Mutsumi Station becoming "TD-29".

== Passenger statistics ==
In fiscal 2019, the station was used by an average of 14,840 passengers daily.

== Surrounding area ==
- Mutsumi Post Office
- Toho Kamagaya Hospital

== See also ==
- List of railway stations in Japan
