= Iyotetsu 7000 series =

Japanese electric multiple unit train type

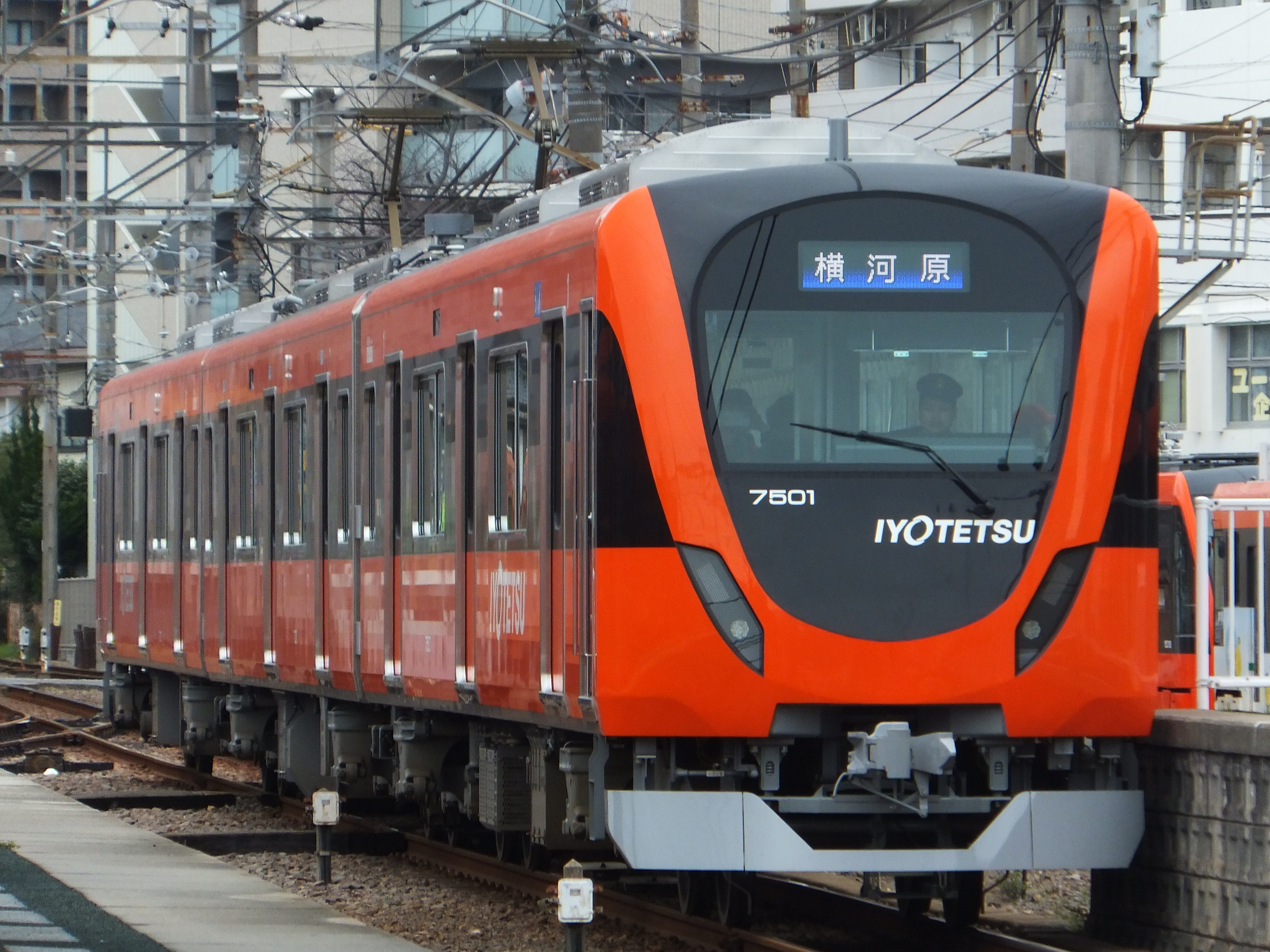
- A 7000 series train in March 2025
- In service: 21 February 2025 – present
- Manufacturer: Kinki Sharyo
- Family name: Smart Sigma
- Replaced: 700 series
- Constructed: 2024–
- Number under construction: 6 vehicles (2 sets)
- Number built: 12 vehicles (4 sets)
- Formation: 3 cars per trainset
- Fleet numbers: 7301–
- Operator: Iyo Railway
- Lines served: Yokogawara Line, Takahama Line, Gunchū Line

Specifications
- Car body construction: Stainless steel
- Car length: 18,000 mm (59 ft 1 in)
- Width: 2,700 mm (8 ft 10 in)
- Traction system: Variable-frequency
- Current collection: Pantograph
- Braking system: Regenerative braking

The Iyotetsu 7000 series (伊予鉄7000系, Iyotetsu 7000-kei) is an electric multiple unit (EMU) train type operated by the private railway operator Iyo Railway (Iyotetsu) in Japan. Six three-car sets are to be built.

== Overview ==
Details of the new trains on order were first announced by Iyo Railway on 14 November 2023. The 7000 series is expected to replace ageing 700 series sets converted from Keio 5000 series cars, over which they offer 50% energy savings.

Part of Kinki Sharyo's "Smart Sigma" platform, the trains have lightweight stainless steel car bodies. They use variable-frequency drive inverters and regenerative braking. LCD passenger information displays are provided above the doors. LED lighting is used throughout.

== Formation ==
Sets are formed as shown below.

	← Yokogawara Gunchū Port, Takahama →		
Designation	Tc	M	Tc
Numbering	7500	7100	7300

- The M cars are fitted with two single-arm pantographs.
- The Tc cars each have a wheelchair space.

== History ==
In November 2024, the first two sets (7301 and 7302) were delivered from the Kinki Sharyo factory. Sets 7303 and 7304 were delivered in November 2025.

The first two 7000 series sets entered revenue service from 21 February 2025. A further two sets are planned to be introduced every year until 2027.

The 7000 series received the 2026 Laurel Prize, presented annually by the Japan Railfan Club. It is the first train type operated by a private railway in Shikoku to receive the award.

== See also ==
- Tobu 80000 series – 2026 Laurel Prize co-recipient
