= Tobu 80000 series =

Japanese electric multiple unit train type

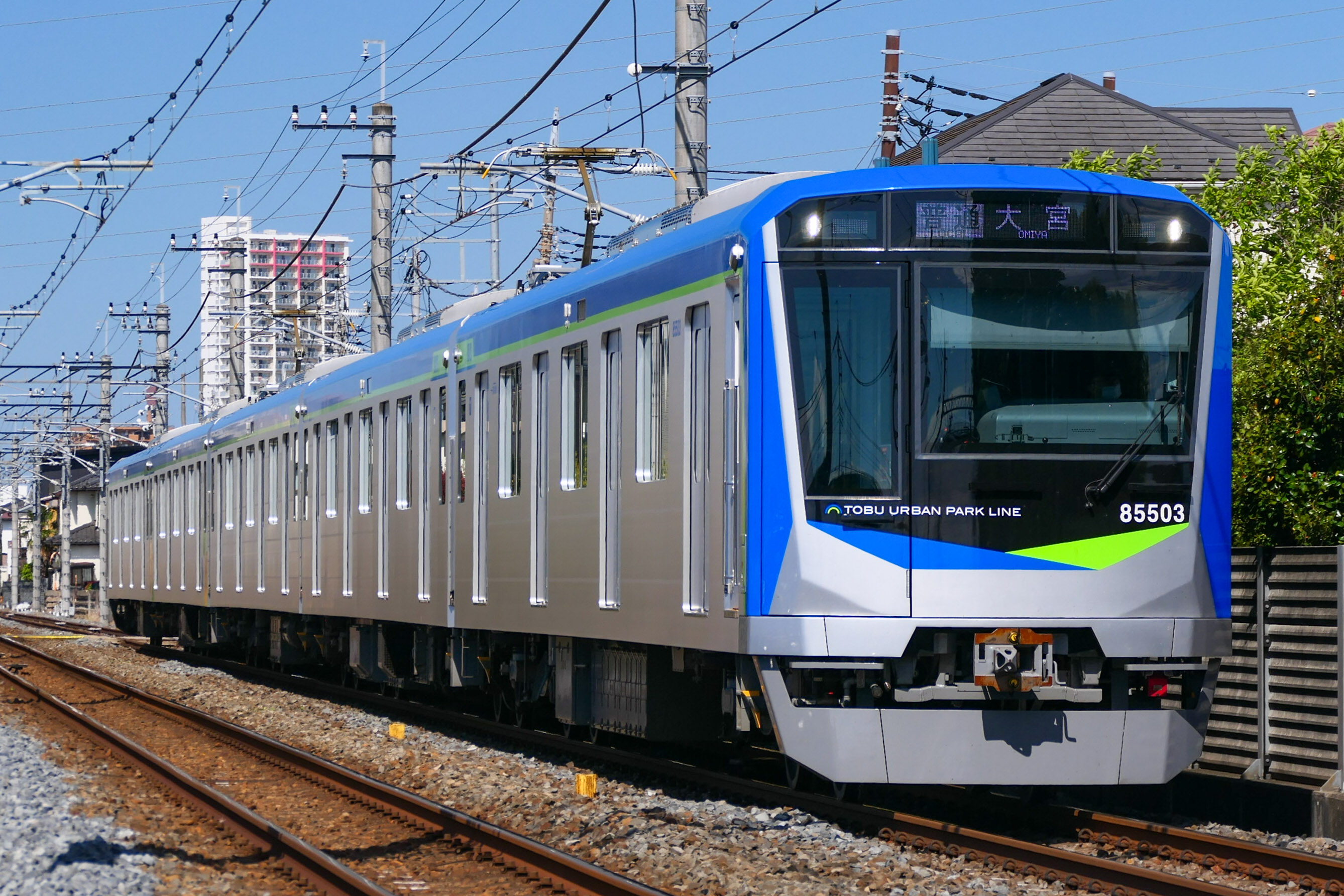
- An 80000 series set in April 2025
- In service: 2025–present
- Manufacturer: Kinki Sharyo
- Replaced: 8000 series; 10000 series
- Constructed: 2024–
- Entered service: 8 March 2025
- Number under construction: 110 vehicles (22 sets) (Note: Includes eighteen 60000 series intermediate cars to be modified.)
- Number built: 15 vehicles (3 sets) as of February 2025
- Formation: 5 cars per trainset
- Operator: Tobu Railway
- Line served: Tōbu Urban Park Line

Specifications
- Car body construction: Aluminium, double-skin
- Car length: 20,470 mm (67 ft 2 in) (end cars); 20,000 mm (65 ft 7 in) (intermediate cars)
- Width: 2,800 mm (9 ft 2 in) (body)
- Height: 4,065 mm (13 ft 4 in); 4,090 mm (13 ft 5 in) (pantograph raised)
- Maximum speed: 120 km/h (75 mph) (design)
- Traction system: Variable frequency (Mitsubishi SynTRACS SiC-MOSFET)
- Traction motors: TM-24 synchronous reluctance motor
- Power output: 250 kW (340 hp) per motor
- Acceleration: 2.23 km/(h⋅s) (1.39 mph/s)
- Deceleration: 3.7 km/(h⋅s) (2.3 mph/s) (service); 4.5 km/(h⋅s) (2.8 mph/s) (emergency)
- Headlight type: LED

Notes/references
- Specification sources: (unless otherwise specified)

The Tobu 80000 series (Japanese: 東武80000系, romanized: Tōbu 80000-kei) is a commuter electric multiple unit (EMU) train type operated by the private railway operator Tobu Railway in Japan. Twenty-five 5-car sets are to be built.

== Overview ==
The 80000 series is slated to replace ageing 8000 and 10000 series EMUs, which were relegated from services on busier lines. The 25 sets will be built by Kinki Sharyo. Seven sets will be entirely new-build, and the remainder will be built as 4-car sets, each receiving a modified 60000 series intermediate car to form a 5-car set.

== Design ==
The 80000 series uses the same body construction as that of the 60000 series, although the type incorporates a curved front-end design. The trains carry a "future blue" and "bright green" livery.

Internally, the trains feature longitudinal seating throughout. A Tanoshiito (たのしーと, lit. 'fun') space is provided at the end of car 4. Sets of 17.5-inch information displays are staggered above the doorways.

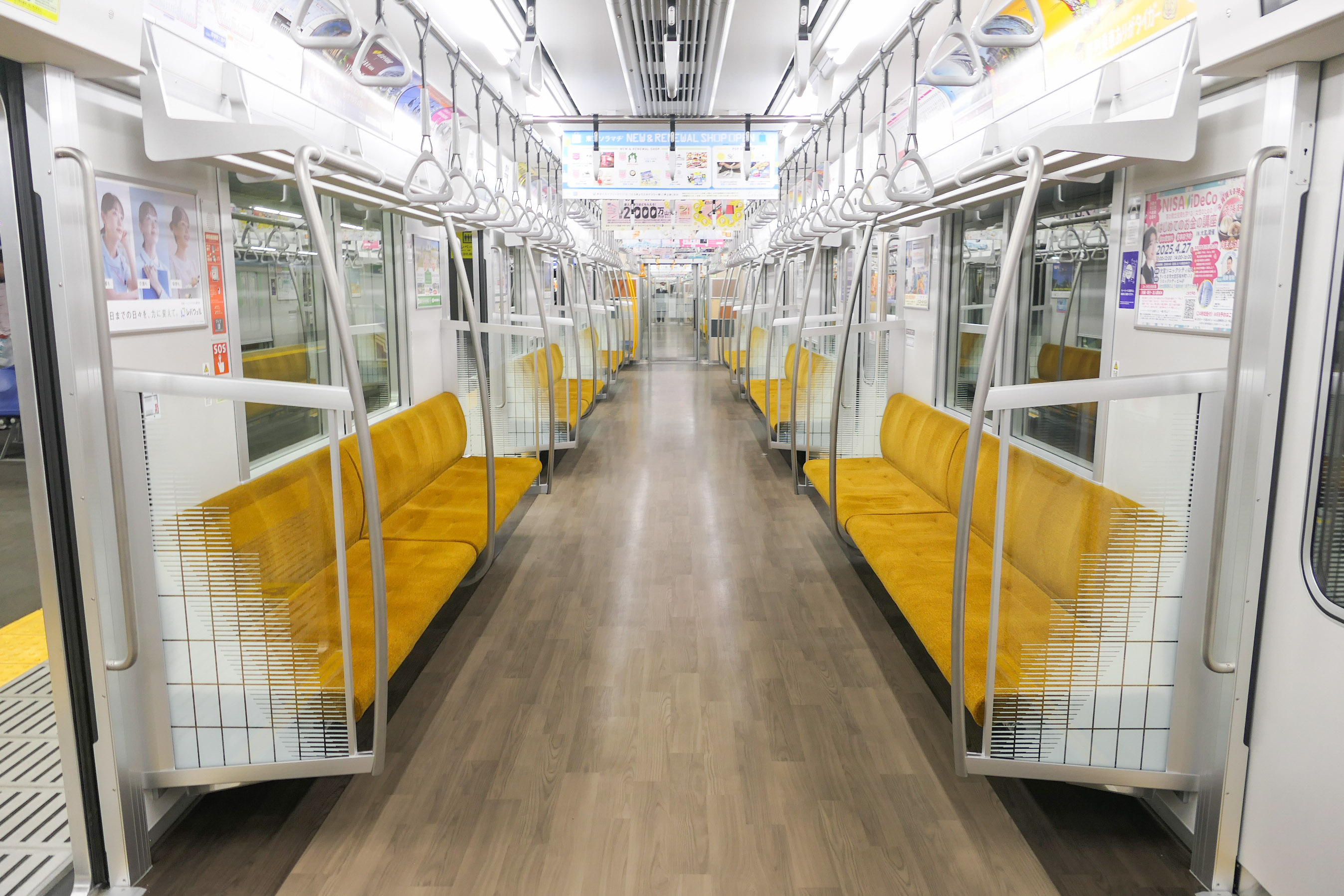
Interior

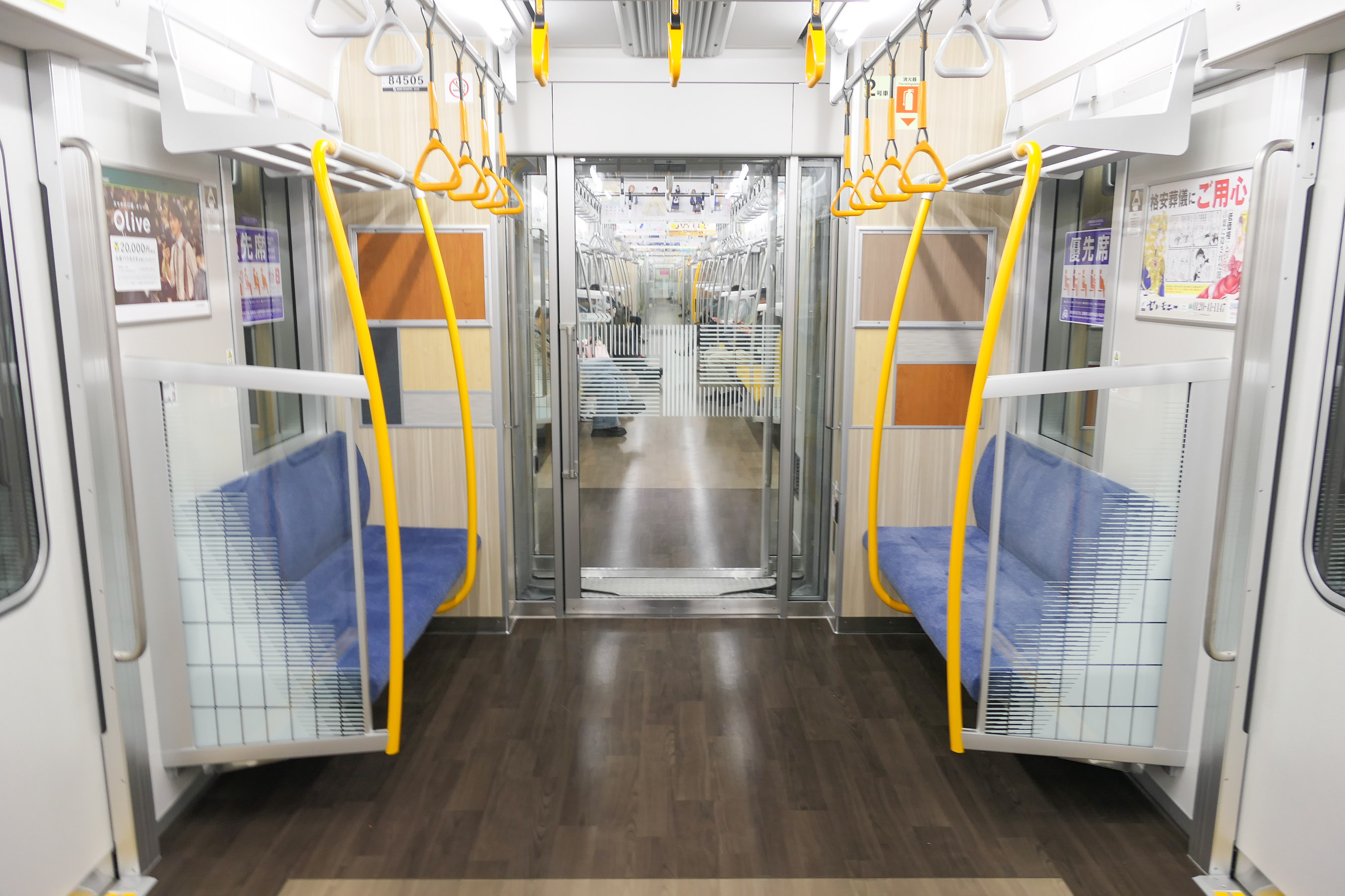
Priority seating

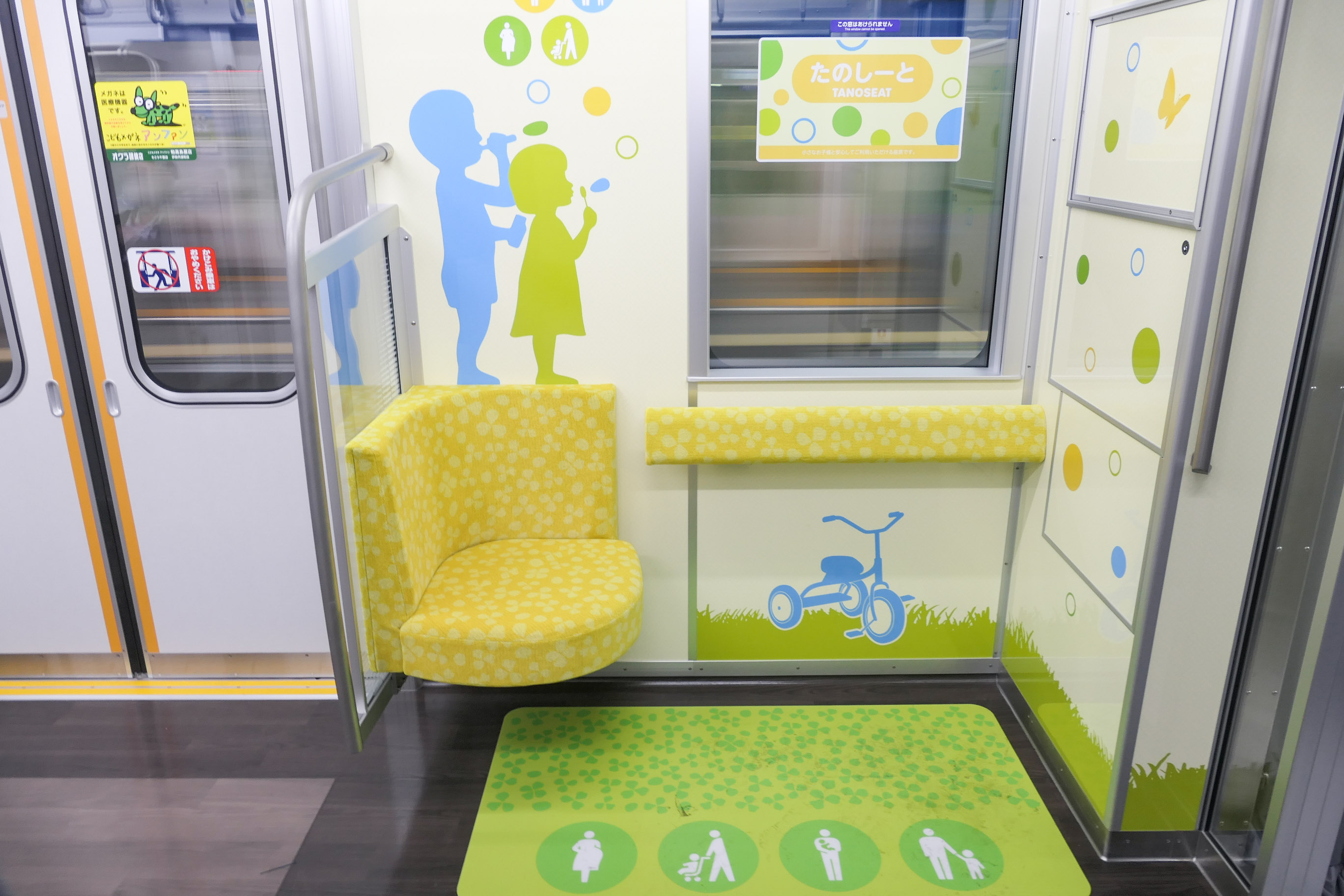
Tanoshiito space

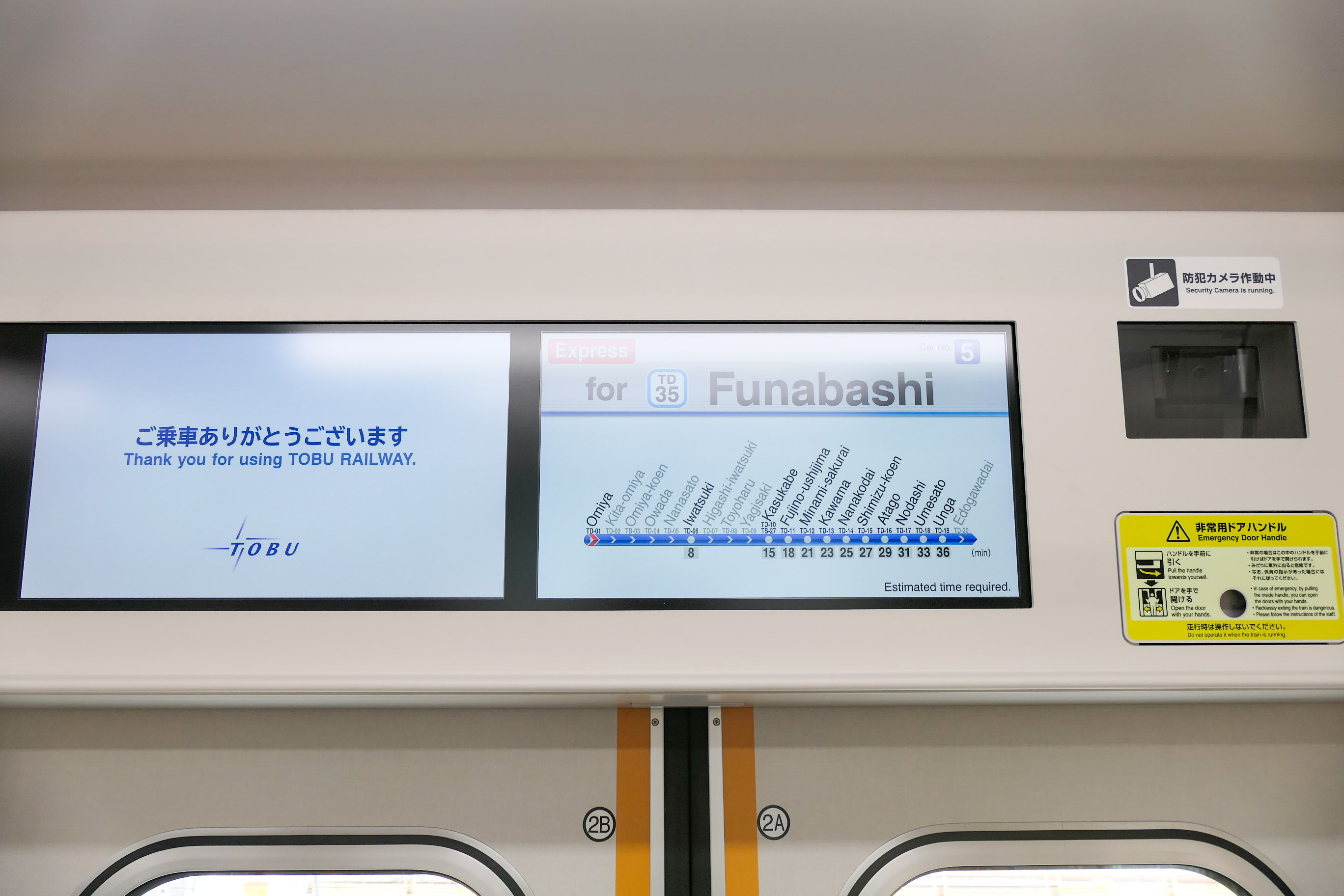
LCD information display

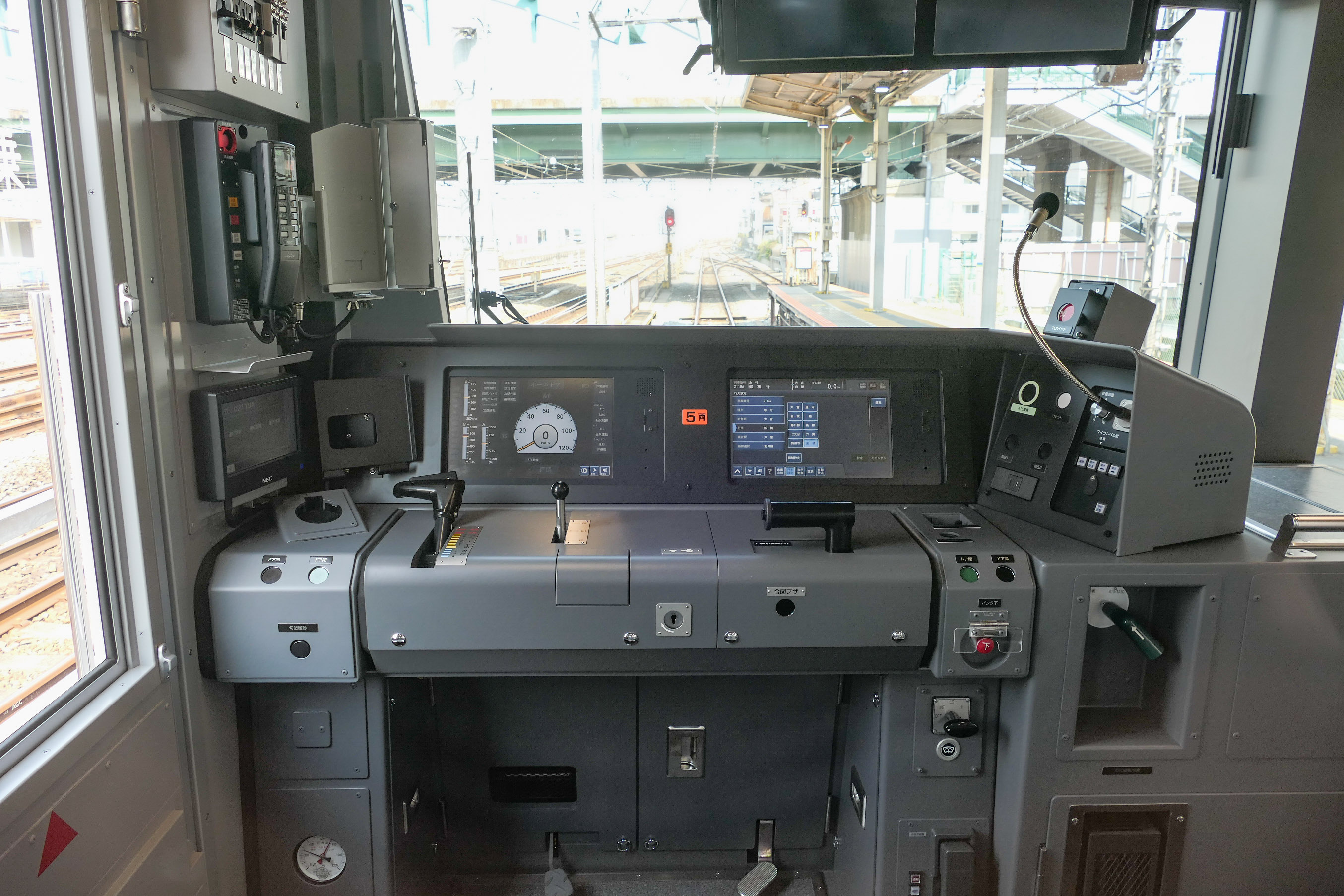
Driver's cab

== Technical details ==
Running sound at Shin-Kamagaya Station (TD-30)

The trains use a SynTRACS variable-frequency traction system incorporating synchronous reluctance motors (SynRM), a first for major private railways in Japan. Unlike permanent-magnet synchronous motors, SynRMs do not use rare-earth magnets and allow for simpler circuitry.

To reduce power losses, the power produced by the trains' regenerative braking system is used to charge the trains' onboard battery system instead of being returned to the overhead lines.

Tobu Railway states that the new traction system, alongside more efficient power supplies and a battery backup system, allow the 80000 series to offer at least 40% energy savings over the earlier 8000 series.

== Formations ==
The sets are formed of two motored cars and three trailer cars, as follows:

	← Kashiwa				
Car No.	5	4	3	2	1
Designation	81500 (Tc1)	82500 (M1)	83300 (T_{x}) (Note: Trailer cars with inspection equipment are designated "T2", ex-60000 series trailer cars are designated "T3", and trailer cars that fit into neither category are designated "T1".)	84400 (M2)	85500 (Tc2)
Weight (t)	29.5	36.3	26.3 (Note: 26.3 tonnes for T1 cars, 30.0 tonnes for T2 cars, 24.7 tonnes for T3 cars)	36.7	29.7

== History ==
Details of the 80000 series trains on order were first announced in April 2024. In light of declining ridership on the Tobu Urban Park Line following the COVID-19 pandemic, Tobu Railway decided to reduce train capacity (from 6-car sets to 5-car sets) instead of reducing frequency.

The first two sets were delivered from the Kinki Sharyo plant in December 2024. These sets are entirely new-build. By February 2025, three completely new-build sets had been delivered.

The 80000 series first entered service on the Urban Park Line on 8 March 2025. Initially intended to operate alongside older 6-car sets, Tobu Railway plans to complete the Urban Park Line's transition to 5-car sets by March 2029.

The 80000 series received the 2026 Laurel Prize, presented annually by the Japan Railfan Club.

== See also ==
- Iyotetsu 7000 series – Laurel Prize co-recipient
