= 60000 series =

60000 series may refer to:

== Japanese train types ==
- Odakyu 60000 series MSE electric multiple unit
- Tobu 60000 series electric multiple unit
