= Tobu 60000 series =

Electric multiple unit operated by Tobu Railway in Japan

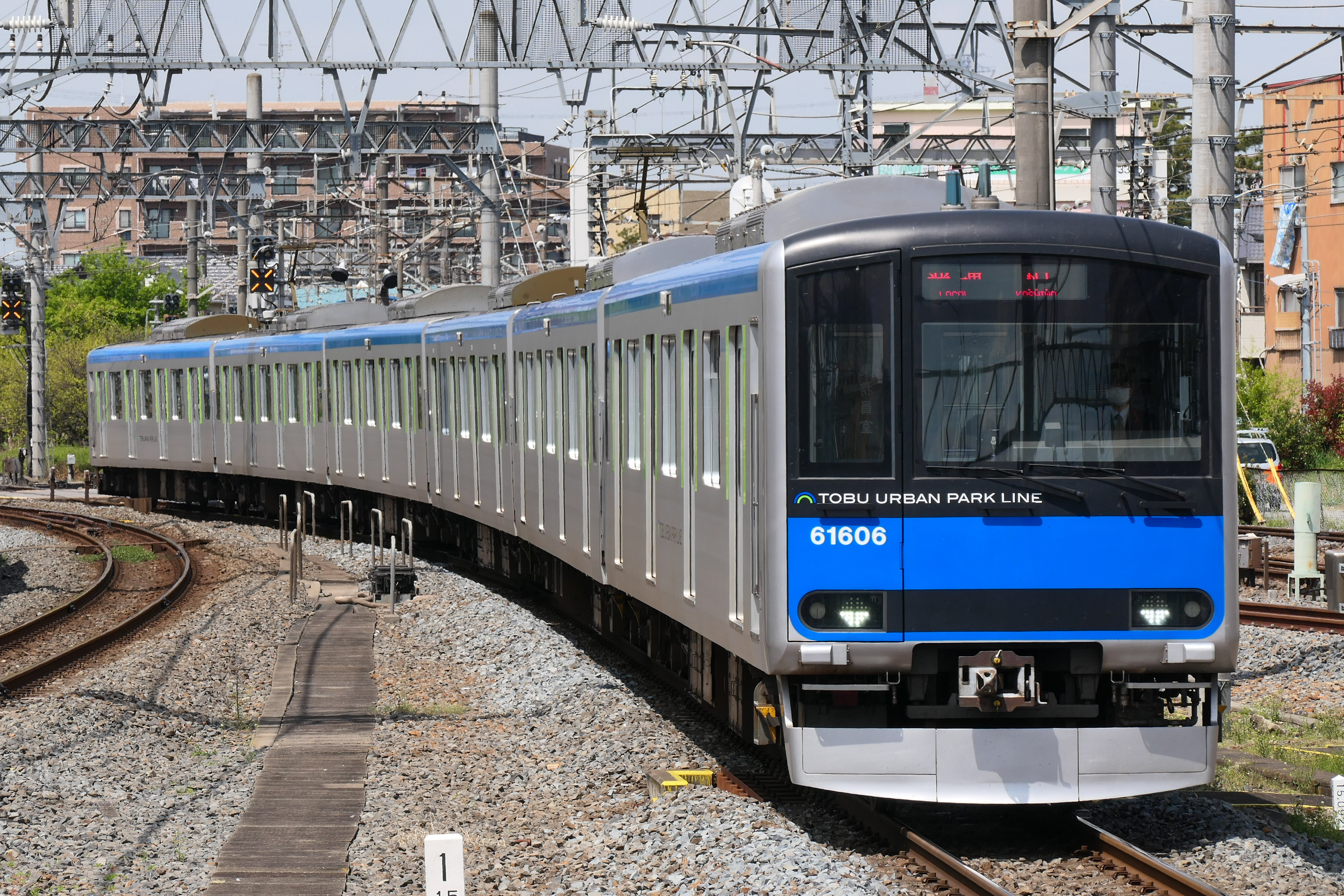
- Set 61606 on the Noda Line, April 2021
- In service: 15 June 2013 – present
- Manufacturer: Hitachi
- Built at: Kudamatsu, Yamaguchi
- Family name: A-train
- Replaced: 8000 series
- Constructed: 2013–2015
- Number built: 108 vehicles (18 sets)
- Number in service: 106 vehicles (18 sets)
- Formation: 5/6 cars per trainset
- Fleet numbers: 61601–
- Capacity: 850 per set
- Operator: Tobu Railway
- Depot: Nanakodai
- Line served: Tobu Urban Park Line

Specifications
- Car body construction: Aluminium alloy
- Car length: 20,130 mm (66 ft 1 in) (end cars); 20,000 mm (65 ft 7 in) (int. cars)
- Width: 2,800 mm (9 ft 2 in)
- Height: 4,050 mm (13 ft 3 in)
- Floor height: 1,125 mm (3 ft 8.3 in)
- Doors: 4 pairs per side
- Maximum speed: 120 km/h (75 mph)
- Traction system: IGBT–VVVF (Hitachi)
- Traction motors: 12 × Hitachi TM-12 165 kW (221 hp) fully-enclosed 3-phase AC induction motor
- Power output: 1.98 MW (2,660 hp)
- Acceleration: 2.23 km/(h⋅s) (1.39 mph/s)
- Deceleration: 3.5 km/(h⋅s) (2.2 mph/s) (service); 4.5 km/(h⋅s) (2.8 mph/s) (emergency)
- Electric systems: 1,500 V DC (overhead line)
- Current collection: PT7112-B single-arm pantograph
- Bogies: TRS-12M (motored); TRS-12T (trailer)
- Braking system: Electronically controlled pneumatic brakes
- Safety system: Tobu ATS
- Track gauge: 1,067 mm (3 ft 6 in)

The Tobu 60000 series (東武60000系, Tōbu 60000-kei) is a Japanese DC electric multiple unit (EMU) commuter train type operated by the private railway operator Tobu Railway on Tobu Urban Park Line services since June 2013.

== Overview ==
The first two six-car sets were introduced on the 62.7 km (39.0 mi) Tobu Noda Line from 15 June 2013, replacing older 8000 series sets. A further six sets (36 vehicles) were introduced during fiscal 2013.

Based on the 50000 series EMUs first introduced in 2004, the 60000 series have aluminium alloy bodies with a double-skin construction manufactured using friction stir welding (FSW). The trains feature VVVF control, and use fully enclosed motors reducing environmental noise.

Externally, the front ends and upper bodysides are finished in "future blue", the colour used for the Tobu corporate logo, and "bright green" highlights are used on either side of the doors.

== Formation ==
As of 1 April 2016, the fleet consists of 18 six-car sets based at Nanakodai Depot. Trainsets consist of three motored (M) cars and three unpowered trailer (T) cars, and are formed as shown below with the Tc1 cars at the Kashiwa end.

	← Kashiwa Funabashi →					
Designation	Tc1	M1	M2	T1	M3	Tc2
Numbering	61600	62600	63600	64600	65600	66600
Capacity (total/seated)	133/48	146/51	146/51	146/51	146/51	133/48
Weight (t)	27.7	33.1	33.1	28.1	31.9	27.8

The M1 and M3 cars each have one PT7112-B single-arm pantograph. Car 4 is designated as a mildly air-conditioned car.

== Interior ==
Internally, the trains use LED lighting throughout, with the illumination level capable of being adjusted to 100%, 50%, or 25% brightness. LCD passenger information displays are provided above the doors, and a Wi-Fi service is provided – for the first time on Tobu Railway trains.

Seating consists of longitudinal bench seats throughout, with a seat width of 460 mm (18 in) per person. Wheelchair spaces are provided at one end of each of the four intermediate cars.

The glass panels on the doors separating each car are decorated with designs depicting the five different "city flowers" of the eight cities served by the Noda Line: cherry blossom (Saitama), wysteria (Kasukabe), sunflower (Kashiwa and Funabashi), rhododendron (Noda, Nagareyama, Matsudo), and Japanese bellflower (Kamagaya).

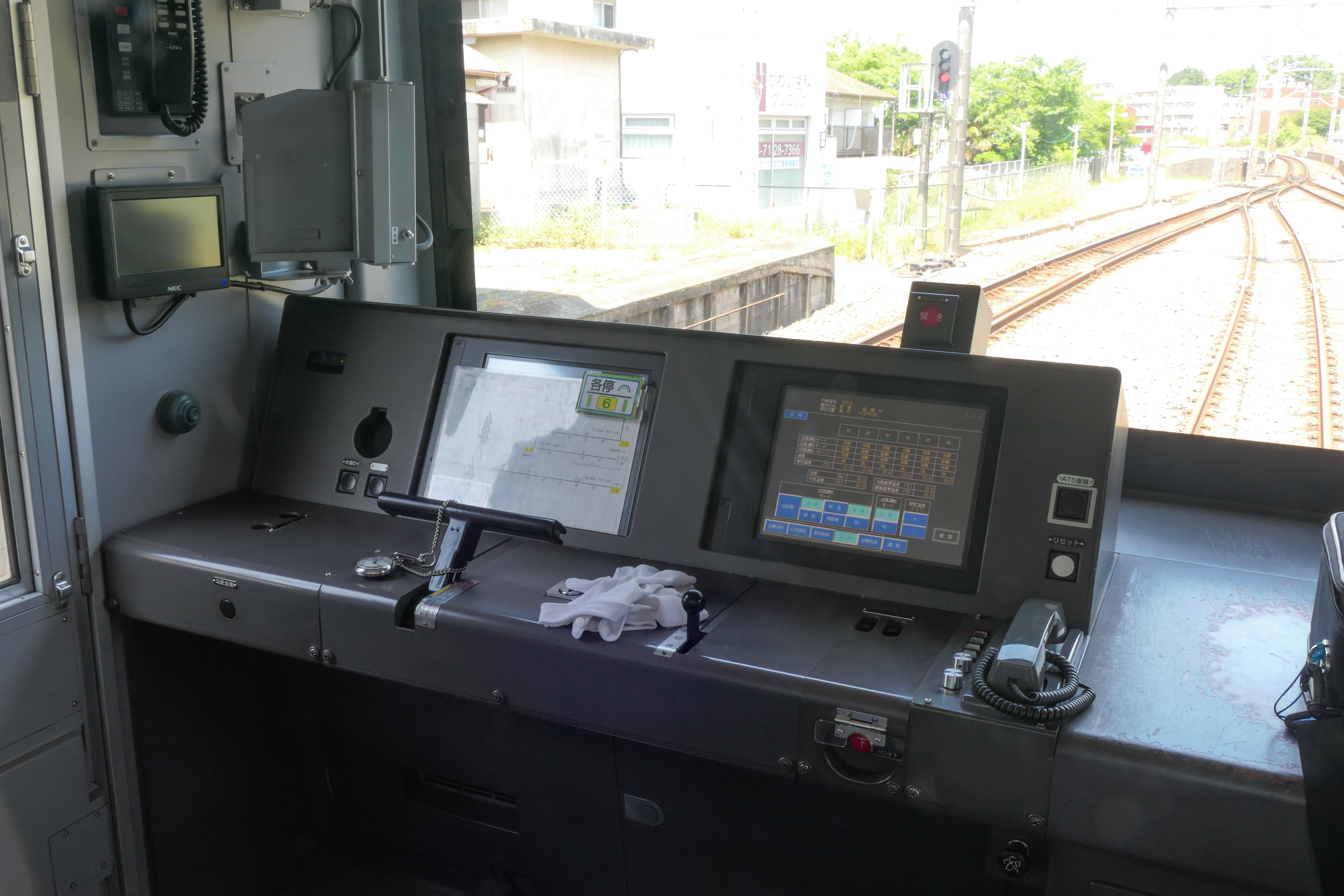
Driver's cab

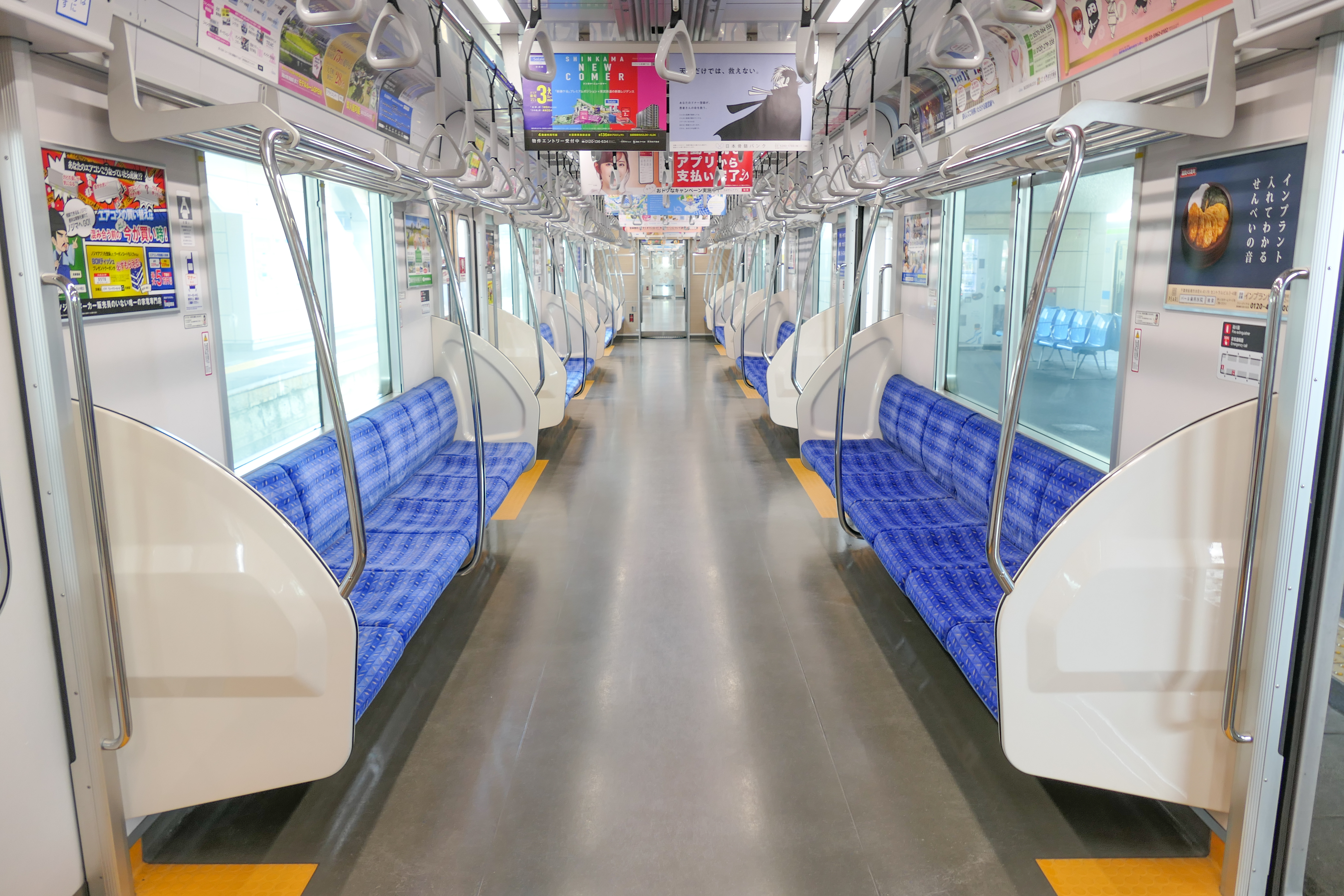
Interior view

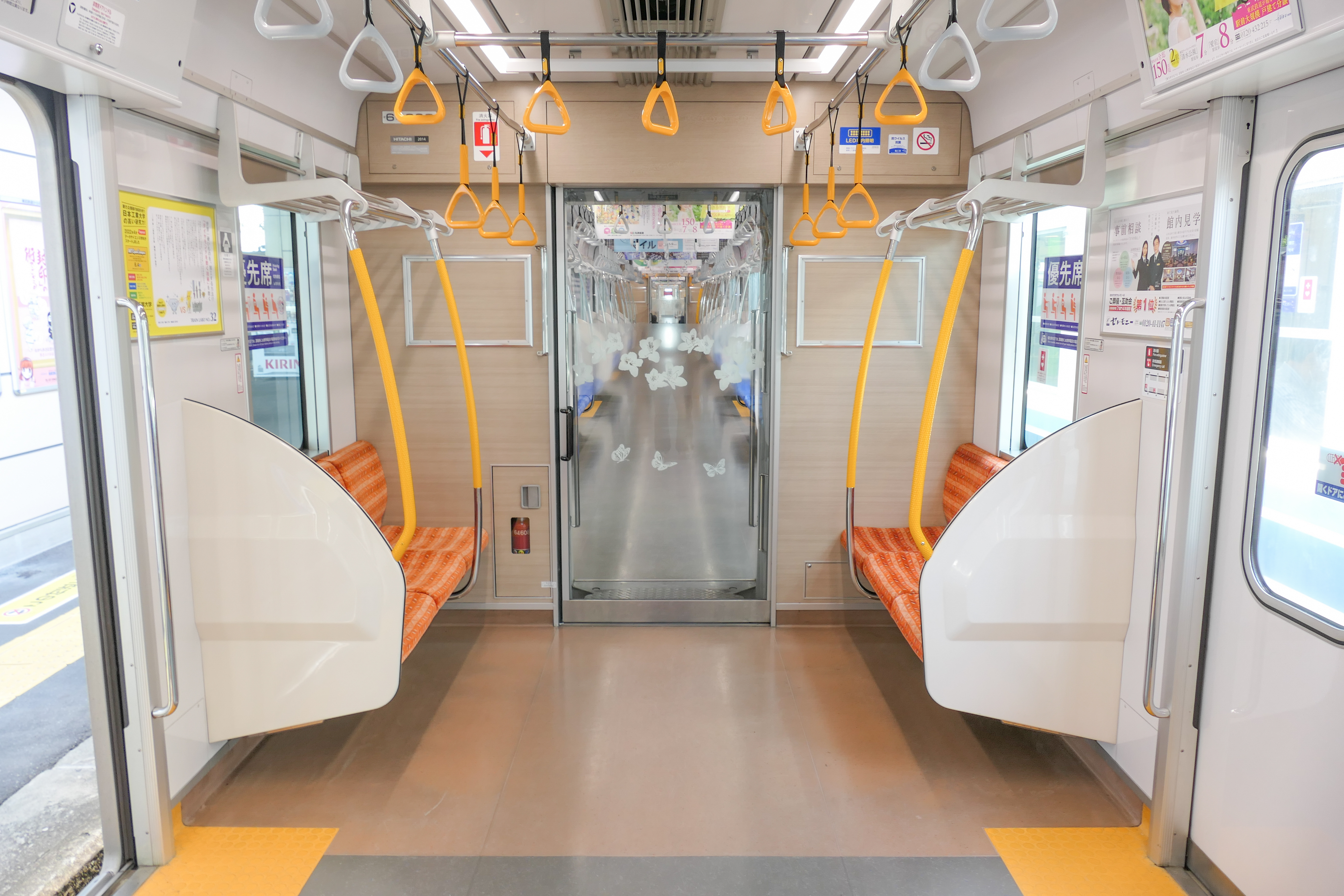
Priority seating

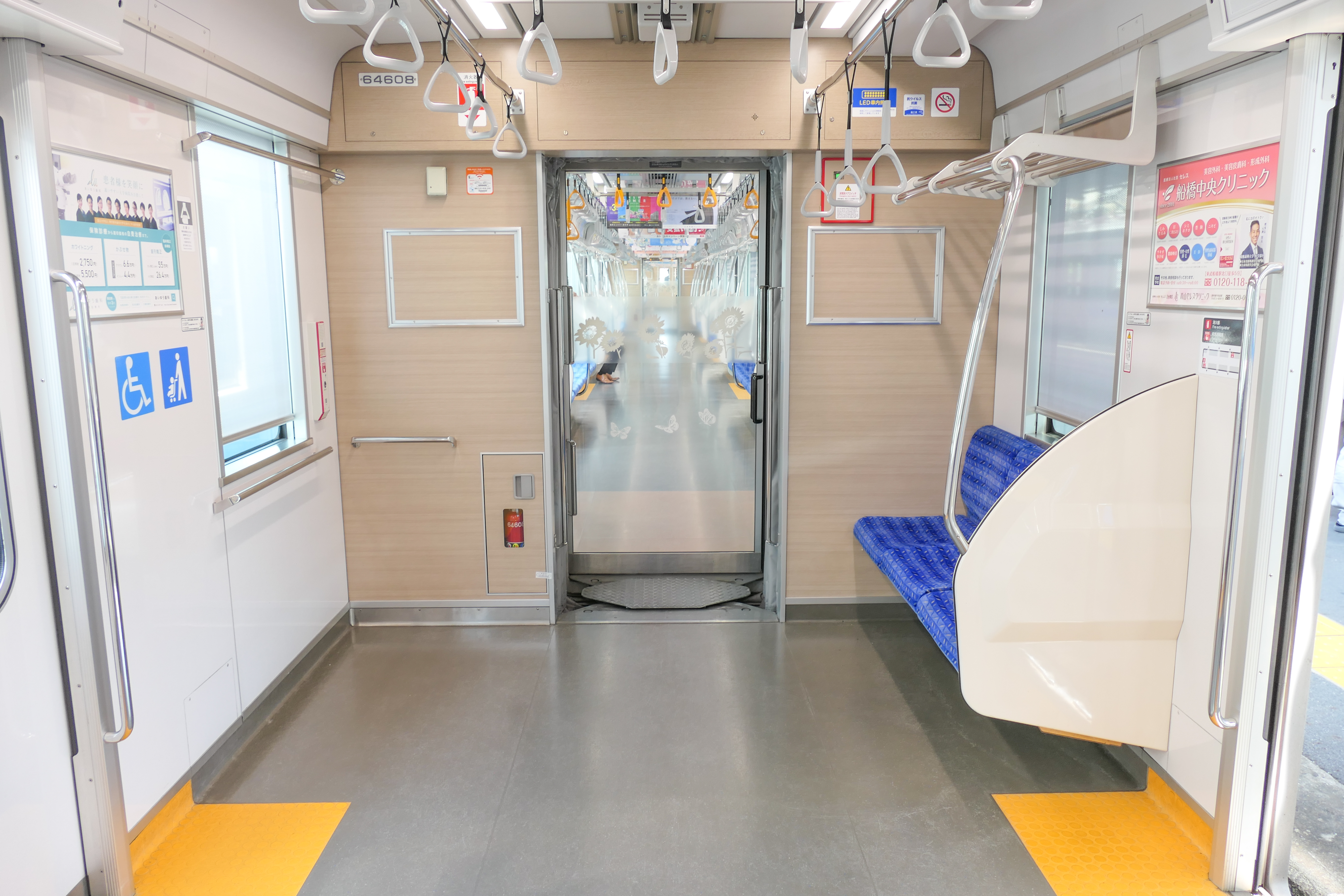
Wheelchair space

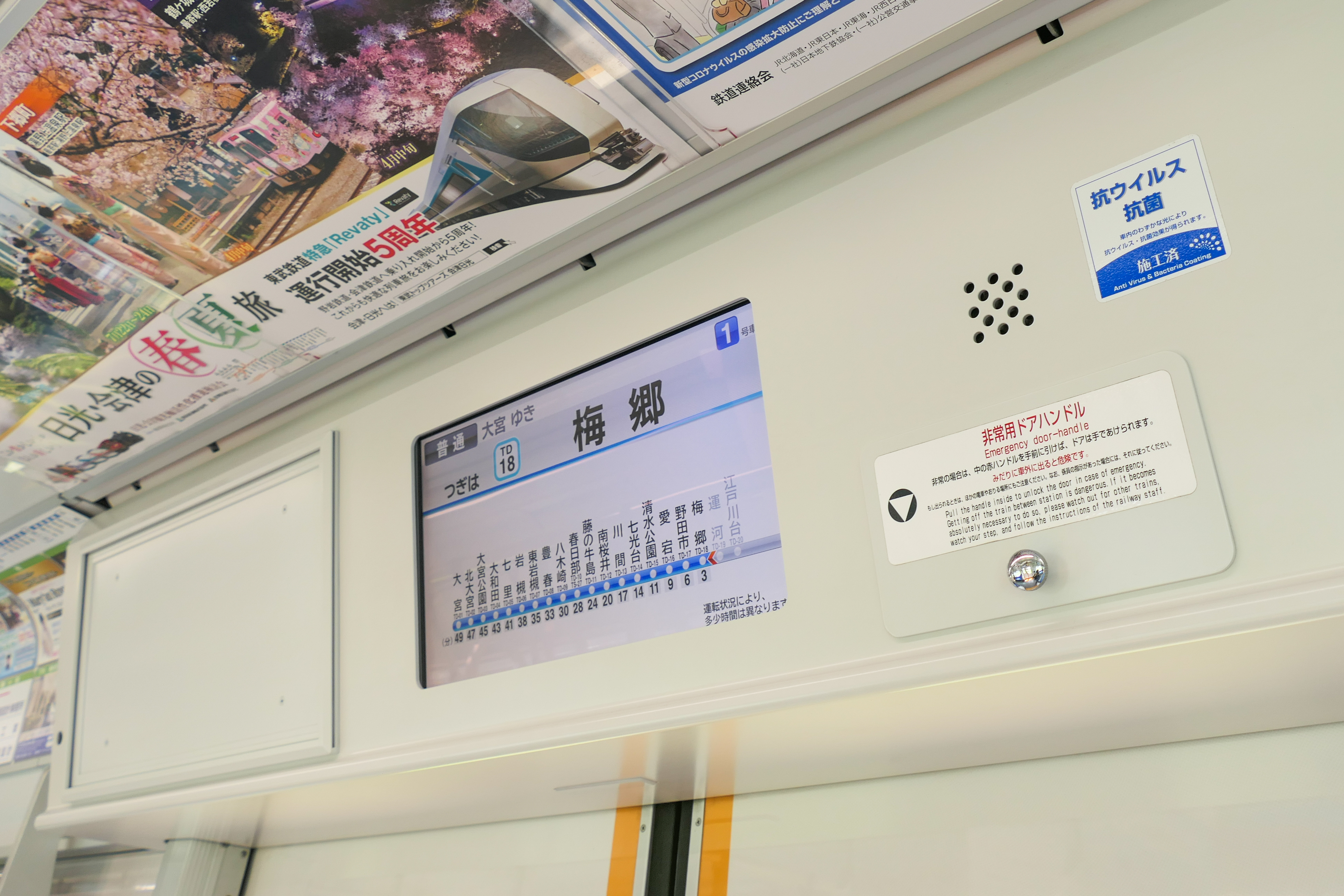
Passenger information screen

== History ==
The first two sets, 61601 and 61602, were delivered from the Hitachi factory in Kudamatsu, Yamaguchi in March 2013. Set 61601 entered revenue service on 15 June 2013, with 61602 entering service on 21 June 2013. Sets 61603 and 61604 were delivered together from Hitachi in January 2014, both entering revenue service from 27 January 2014.

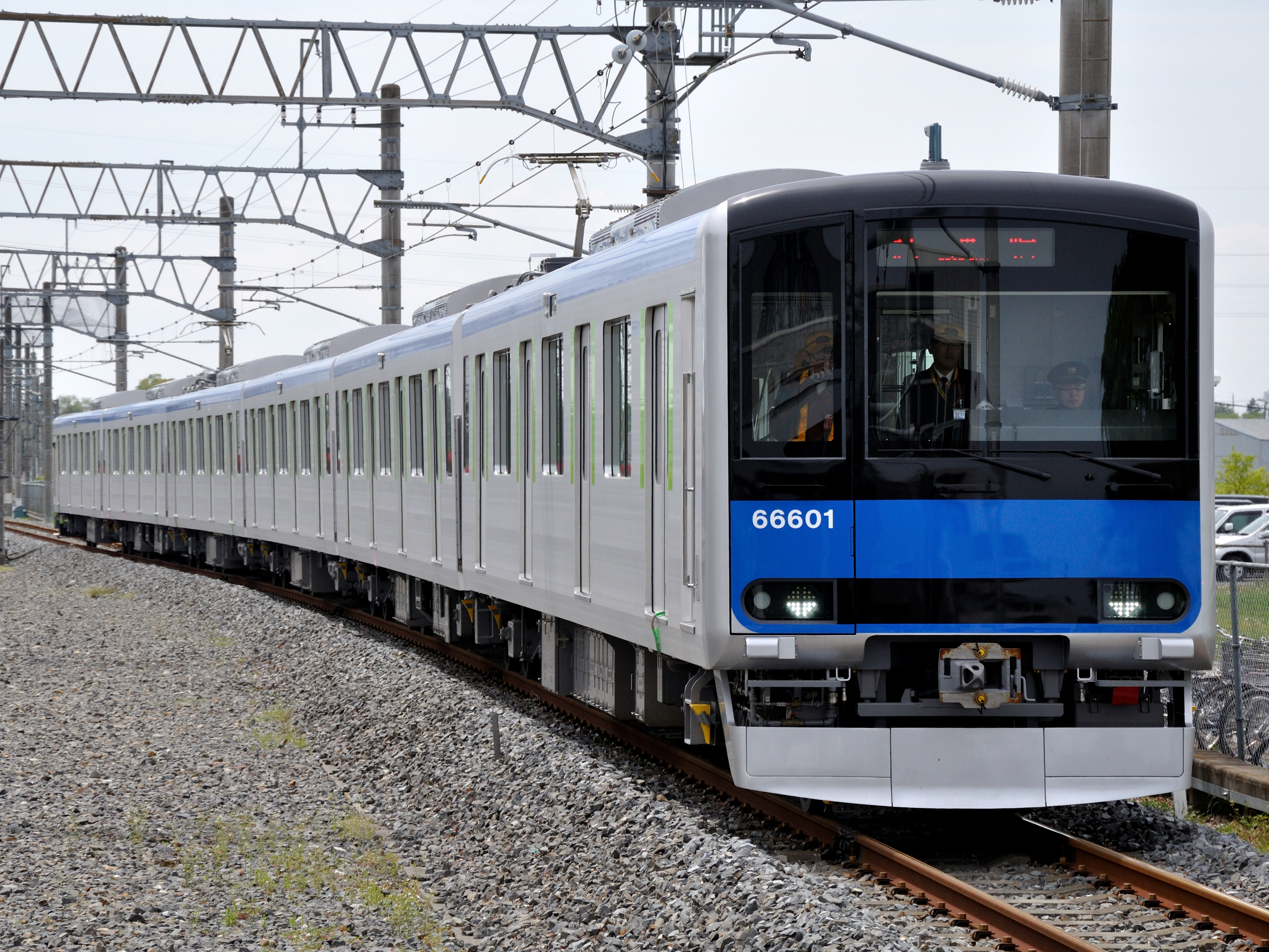
Set 61601 undergoing test running on the Tobu Nikko Line, April 2013

=== Conversion to 5-car formation ===
In April 2024, Tobu Railway announced that the 60000 series fleet will be shortened to five-car formations, with the surplus cars being used to form new 80000 series trains. The first shortened set, 61501 (originally 61601), was delivered back from the Kinki Sharyo plant in July 2025. It returned to service on 8 November, and set 61502 returned to service the following day.

Shortened 60000 series sets received several modifications including full-colour LED destination displays, external cameras, and a refreshed interior based on that of the 80000 series.

== Fleet history ==
The fleet history details are as shown below.

Set No.	Manufacturer	Date delivered
61601	Hitachi	21 March 2013
61602	Hitachi	22 March 2013
61603	Hitachi	14 January 2014
61604	Hitachi	15 January 2014
61605	Hitachi	17 February 2014
61606	Hitachi	18 February 2014
61607	Hitachi	19 March 2014
61608	Hitachi	20 March 2014
61609	Hitachi	8 December 2014
61610	Hitachi	9 December 2014
61611	Hitachi	13 January 2015
61612	Hitachi	14 January 2015
61613	Hitachi	16 February 2015
61614	Hitachi	17 February 2015
61615	Hitachi	16 March 2015
61616	Hitachi	17 March 2015
61617	Hitachi	4 November 2015
61618	Hitachi	5 November 2015
