= Iyotetsu 700 series =

Japanese train type

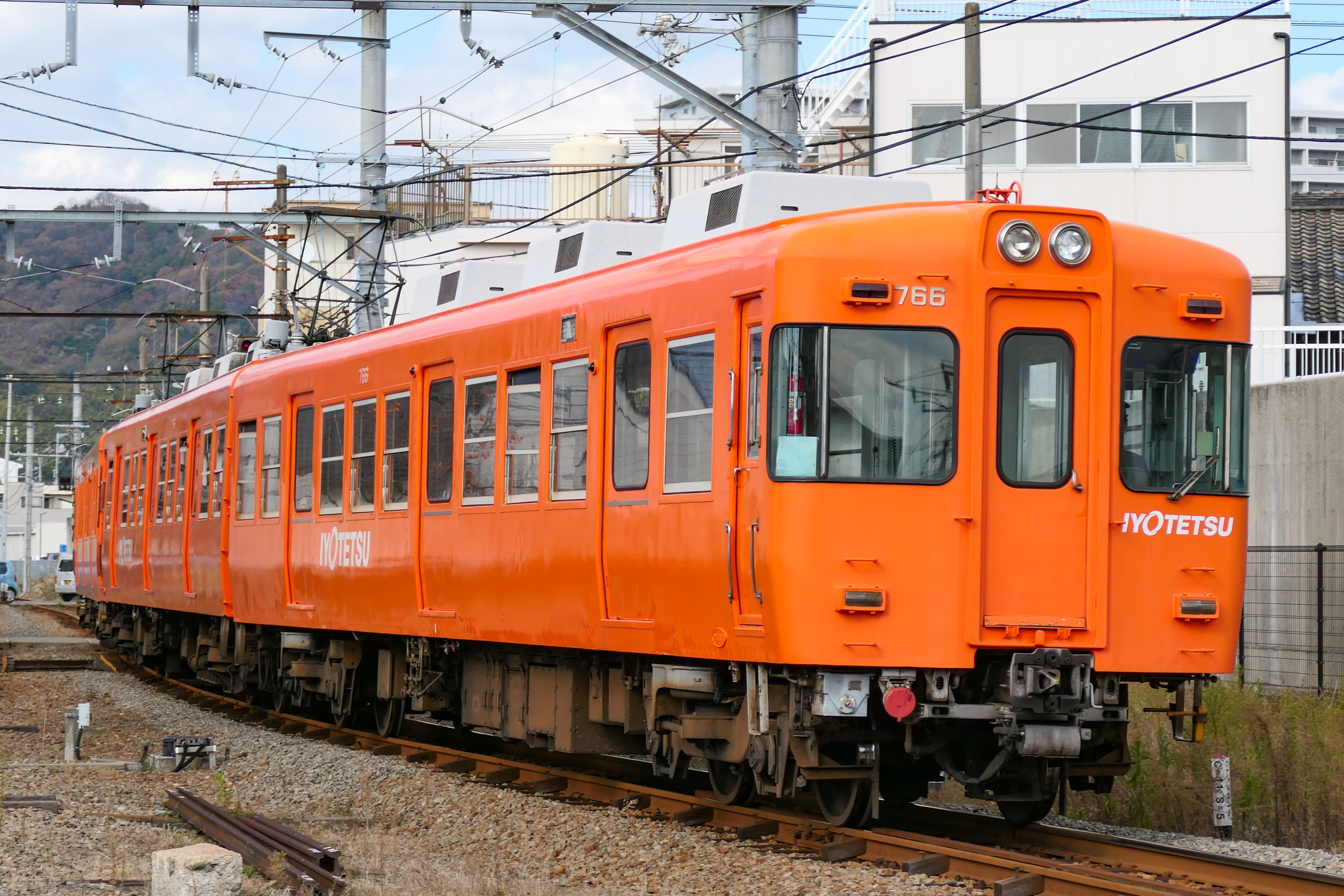
- Three-car set 766 in December 2021
- In service: 1987–present
- Number built: 28 vehicles (10 sets)
- Number in service: 7 vehicles (3 sets) (as of July 2026)
- Successor: 7000 series
- Formation: 2/3 cars per trainset
- Operator: Iyo Railway

Specifications
- Car body construction: Steel
- Car length: 18,000 mm (59 ft 1 in)
- Width: 2,700 mm (8 ft 10 in)
- Doors: 3 per side
- Traction system: Resistor control
- Electric system: 600/750 V DC
- Current collection: Overhead wire
- Track gauge: 1,067 mm (3 ft 6 in)

The Iyotetsu 700 series (伊予鉄700系, Iyotetsu 700-kei) is an electric multiple unit (EMU) train type operated by the private railway operator Iyo Railway (Iyotetsu) in Matsuyama, Ehime, Japan, since 1987.

== Design ==
The trains were converted from former Keio 5000 series EMU cars between 1987 and 1994.

== Formations ==
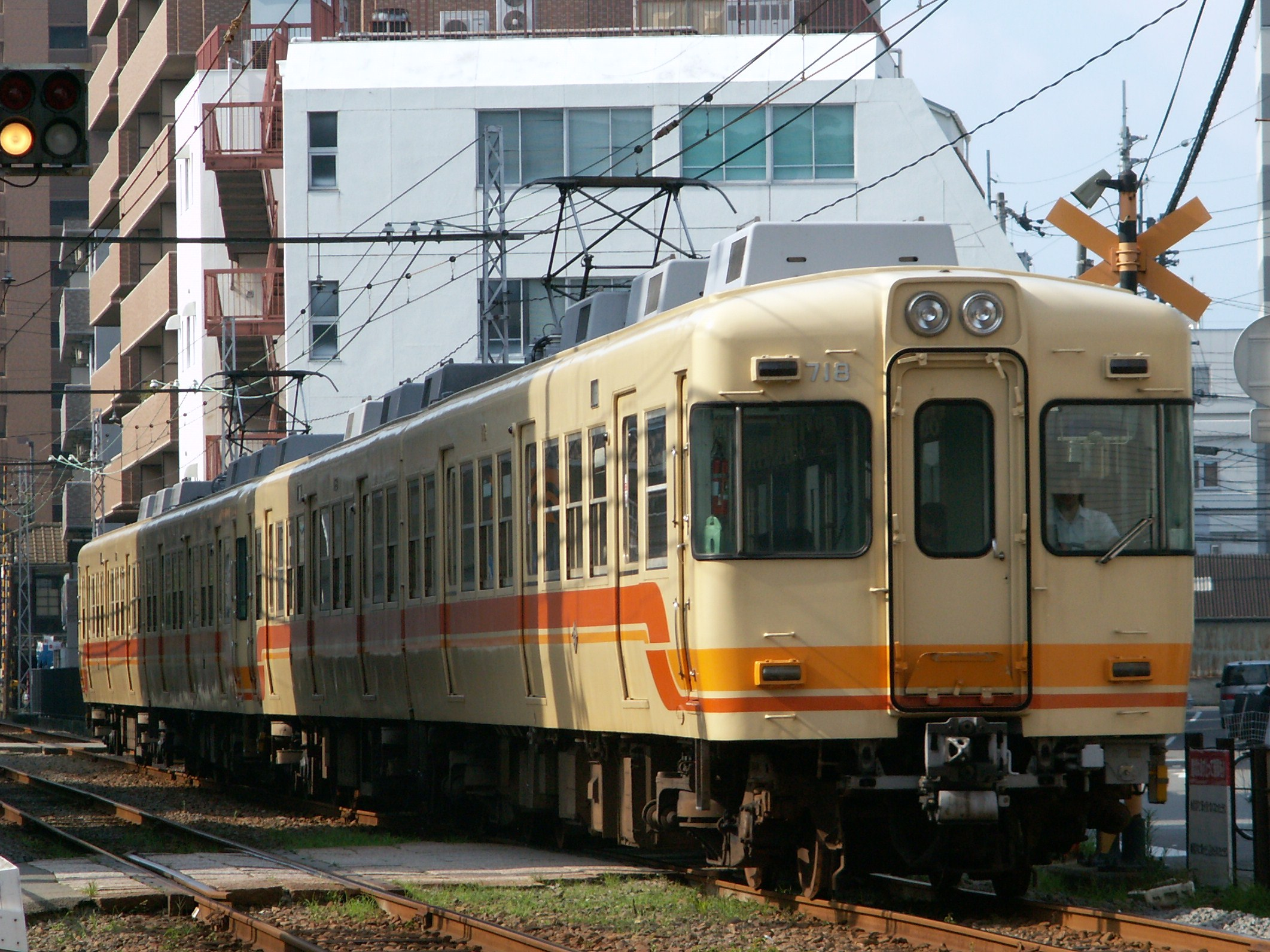
Two-car sets 718 and 719 in July 2008

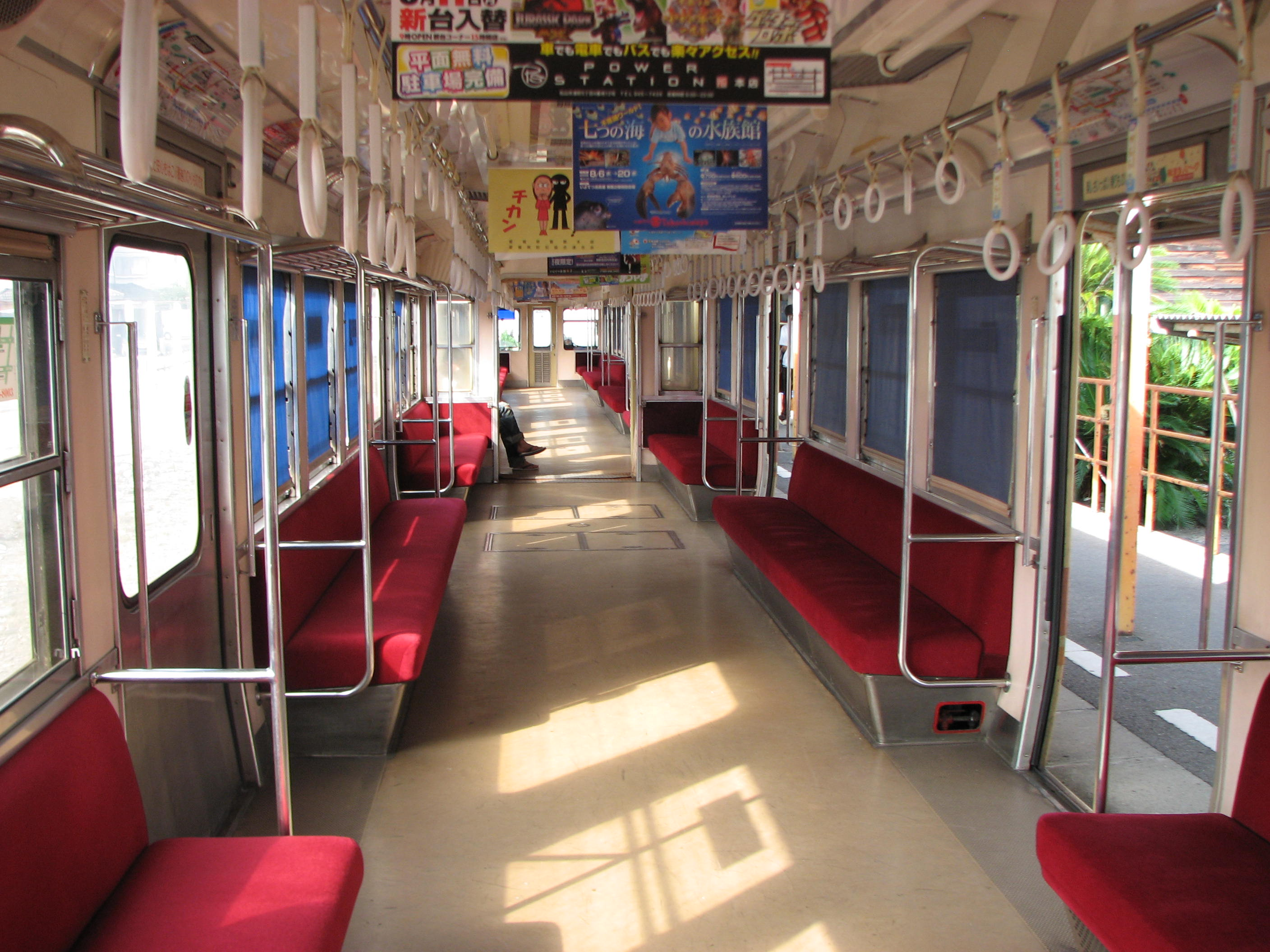
The interior of car MoHa 715 in August 2008

As of 1 April 2015, the fleet consists of six three-car sets and two two-car sets, formed as follows. All cars have a driving cab at one end.

=== 3-car sets ===
Designation	Tc	Mc	Mc
Numbering	76x	71x	72x

- "Mc" cars are motored driving cars (with driving cabs).
- "Tc" cars are unpowered trailer cars.
- The "Mc" cars are equipped with one lozenge-type pantograph.

=== 2-car sets ===
Designation	Tc	Mc
Numbering	76x	71x

- "Mc" cars are motored driving cars (with driving cabs).
- "Tc" cars are unpowered trailer cars.
- The "Mc" cars are equipped with one lozenge-type pantograph.

== History ==
The trains were purchased from Keio Corporation and introduced between 1987 and 1994. The motored cars were mounted on former Tobu Railway and Odakyu EMU bogies to match the Iyotetsu track gauge of 1,067 mm (3 ft 6 in), as the trains originally ran on Keio 1,372 mm (4 ft 6 in) gauge. Three-car set 725 was the first Iyotetsu EMU to be repainted in the new all-over orange Iyotetsu livery, in August 2015.

=== Future replacement ===
On 14 November 2023, Iyo Railway announced that the 700 series is scheduled to be replaced by the 7000 series starting from 2025. As of July 2026, one three-car set and two two-car sets remain in service.

== Resale ==
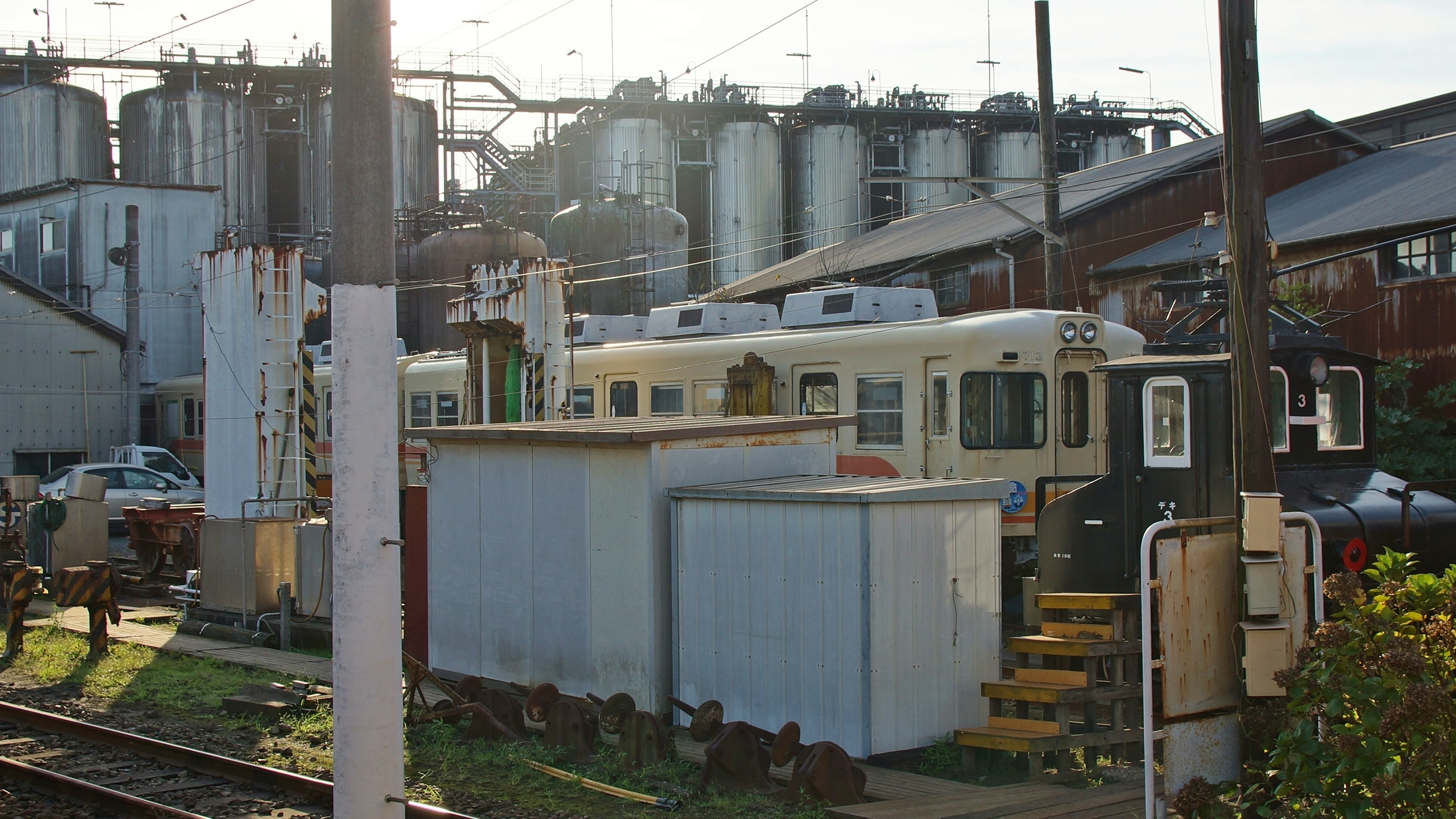
Former Iyo Railway cars MoHa 713 and KuHa 763 at Nakanocho Depot on the Choshi Electric Railway in October 2015

In September 2015, two 700 series cars were sold to the Choshi Electric Railway in Chiba Prefecture for 1.3 million yen.
