= Keio 5000 series (1963) =

Japanese train type

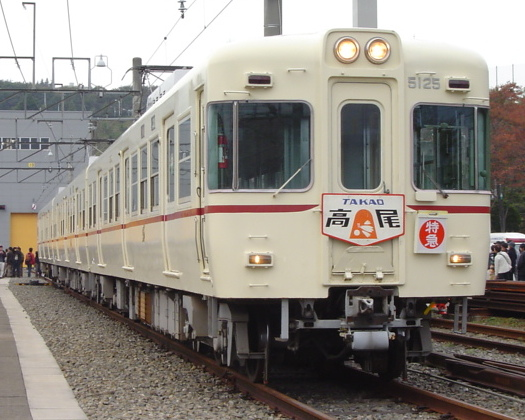
- Preserved 5000 series
- In service: 1963–1996
- Manufacturers: Nippon Sharyo, Tokyu Car Corp, Hitachi
- Constructed: 1963-1969
- Entered service: 4 August 1963
- Number built: 155 vehicles (48 sets)
- Formation: 2/3/4 cars per set
- Operator: Keio Corporation

Specifications
- Car body construction: Steel
- Doors: 3 sliding doors per side
- Electric system: 1,500 V DC
- Current collection: Overhead
- Track gauge: 1,372 mm (4 ft 6 in)

The Keio 5000 series (京王5000系) is an electric multiple unit (EMU) train type which was formerly operated by Keio Corporation in Japan and first introduced in 1963. Built in batches by Nippon Sharyo, Tokyu Car Corp, and Hitachi, it was the recipient of the fourth Laurel Prize of the Japan Railfan Club.

A total of 155 vehicles were built between 1963 and 1969, formed as 23 four-car sets, 13 three-car sets, and 12 two-car sets.

== Withdrawal and resale ==
Withdrawals started in 1987, with the last remaining non-air-conditioned two-car sets (5101 to 5112) operating until 21 March 1989. All units were withdrawn from Keio services by December 1996, and a number of units have since been converted for use on other lines throughout Japan, including the Iyotetsu 700 series.
