= Tobu 8000 series =

Japanese electric multiple unit train type operated by Tobu Railway

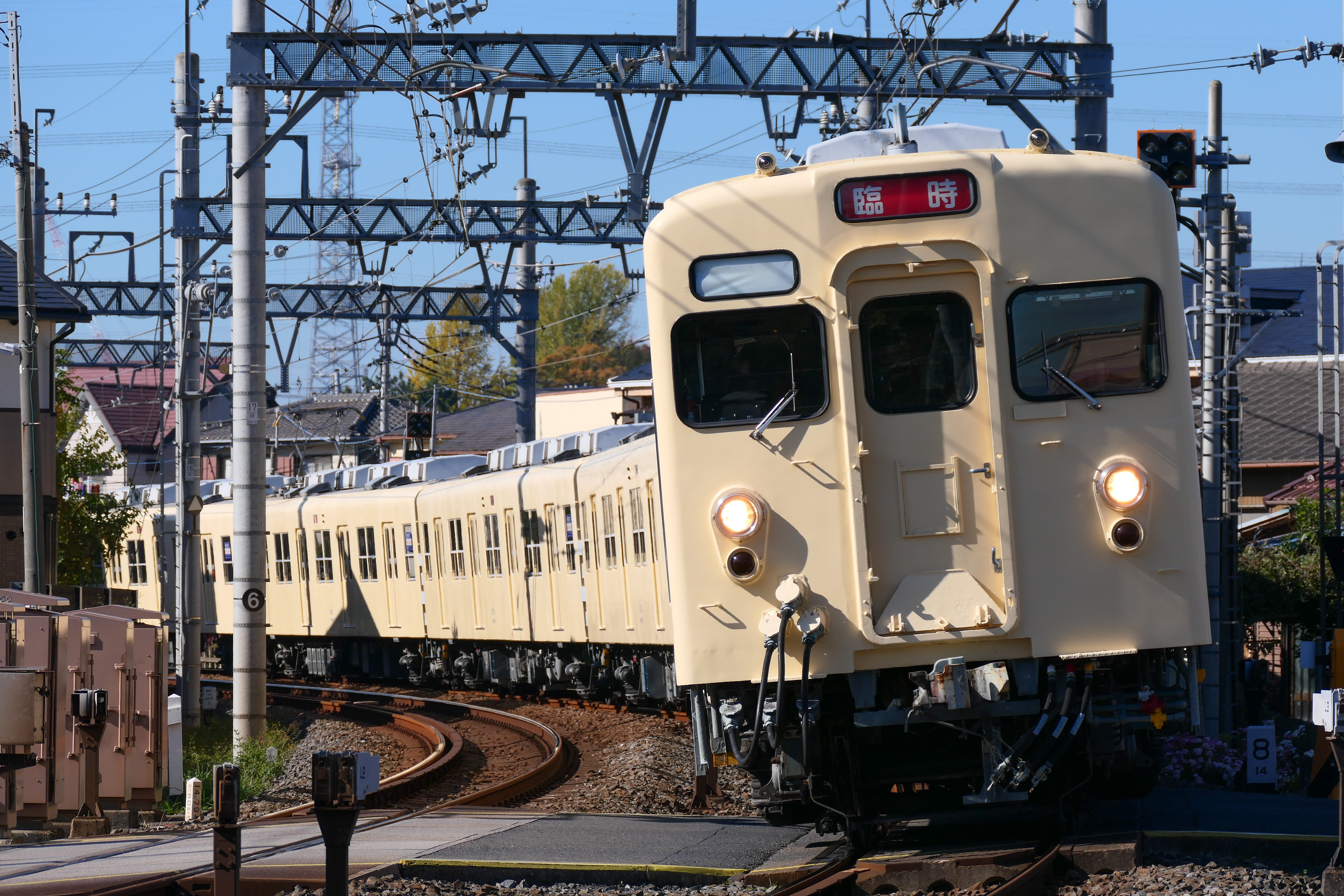
- A 6-car formation on the Noda Line in November 2019
- Manufacturers: Alna Kōki, Fuji Heavy Industries, Kisha Seizo, Nippon Sharyo, Tokyu Car Corporation
- Constructed: 1963–1983
- Entered service: 1963
- Refurbished: 1986–2008
- Scrapped: 2005, 2008–
- Number built: 712 vehicles
- Number in service: 182 vehicles (43 sets, as of November 2024)
- Number preserved: 6 vehicles
- Formation: 2/3/4/6/8 cars per trainset
- Operator: Tobu Railway
- Depots: Kasukabe, Nanakōdai, Tatebayashi, Shinrinkōen, Shin-Tochigi
- Lines served: Isesaki Line; Kameido Line; Daishi Line; Kiryu Line; Sano Line; Koizumi Line; Utsunomiya Line; Urban Park Line; Tojo Line; Ogose Line

Specifications
- Car body construction: Steel
- Car length: 20 m (65 ft 7 in)
- Width: 2,850 mm (9 ft 4 in)
- Doors: 4 pairs per side
- Maximum speed: 100 km/h (62 mph)
- Traction system: Resistor control
- Traction motors: TM63
- Electric systems: 1,500 V DC overhead catenary
- Current collection: Pantograph
- Track gauge: 1,067 mm (3 ft 6 in)

The Tobu 8000 series (東武8000系, Tōbu 8000-kei) is a DC electric multiple unit (EMU) commuter train type operated by the private railway operator Tobu Railway in Japan since 1963. A total of 712 vehicles were built between 1963 and 1983, making this the most numerous EMU type operated by any private railway operator in Japan.

== Fleet ==
As of November 2024, 16 six-car sets, 11 four-car sets, 10 three-car sets and 6 two-car sets are in service.

== Operations ==
=== Isesaki Line ===
The Isesaki Line fleet based at Tatebayashi Depot consists of two-car trainsets. This fleet includes three-car 800 and 850 series trains converted from 8000 series units, which are also based at Tatebayashi Depot. Both types are modified for local driver-only operation services north of Tatebayashi.

=== Kameido Line, Daishi Line ===
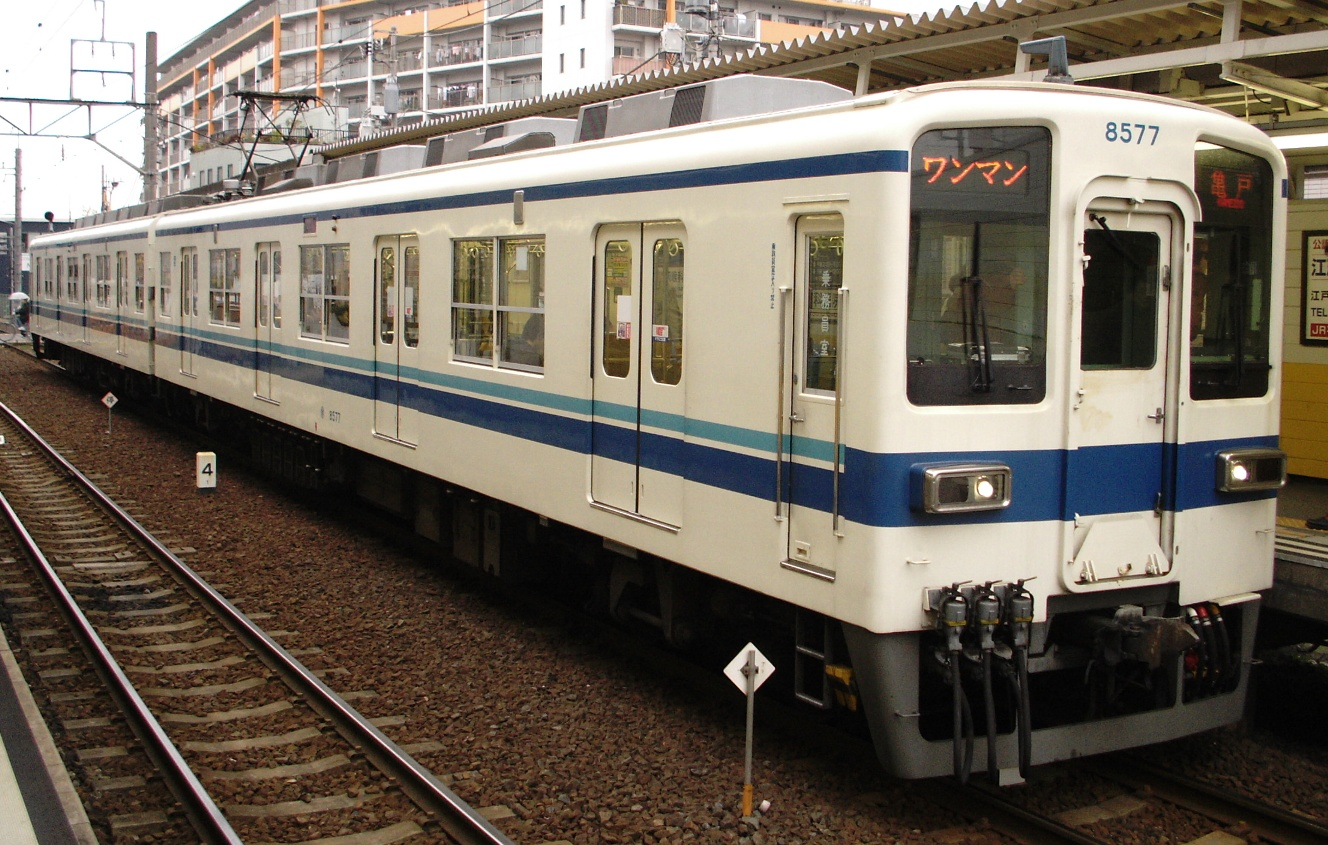
A two-car Kameido Line set in January 2007

The Kameido Line and Daishi Line fleet based at Kasukabe Depot consists of two-car trainsets modified for driver-only operation.

=== Sano Line ===
Tobu Sano Line services are operated by 800 and 850 series three-car driver-only-operation sets introduced from the start of the revised timetable on 18 March 2006.

=== Kiryu Line, Koizumi Line ===
The Kiryu Line and Koizumi Line fleet based at Tatebayashi Depot consists of two-car trainsets modified for driver-only operation.

=== Utsunomiya Line ===
The Utsunomiya Line fleet based at Shin-Tochigi Depot consisted of four-car trainsets modified for driver-only operation. In 2019, the 8000 series sets were withdrawn from use on the Utsunomiya Line.

=== Urban Park Line ===
The Urban Park Line fleet based at Nanakōdai Depot consists of six-car trainsets.

=== Tojo Line ===
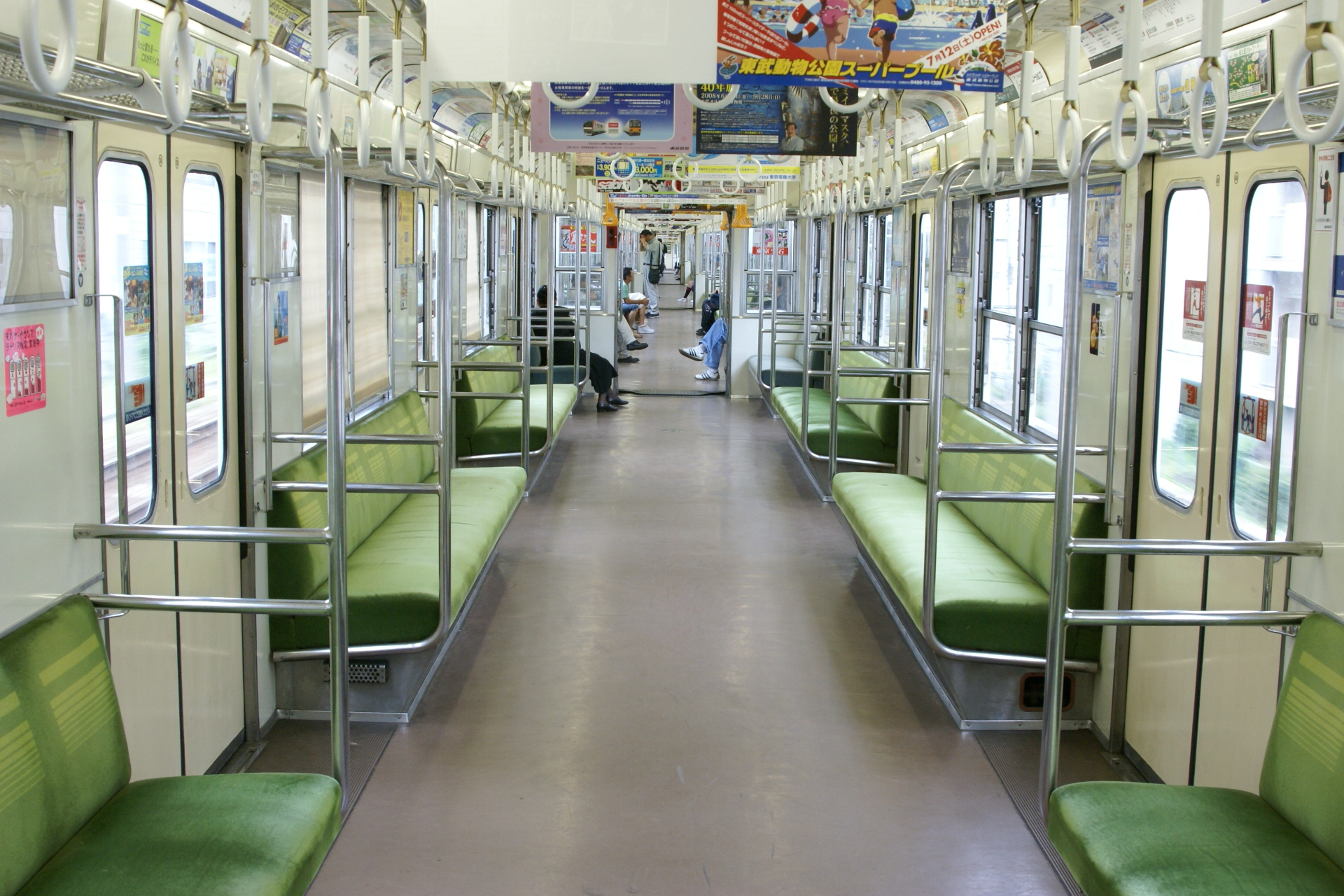
Interior view of a Tojo Line 8000 series, July 2008

The Tōjō Line fleet based at Shinrinkōen Depot consists of 11 four-car trainsets. These are used in local driver-only operation services north of Ogawamachi, where four sets are required every day.

=== Ogose Line ===
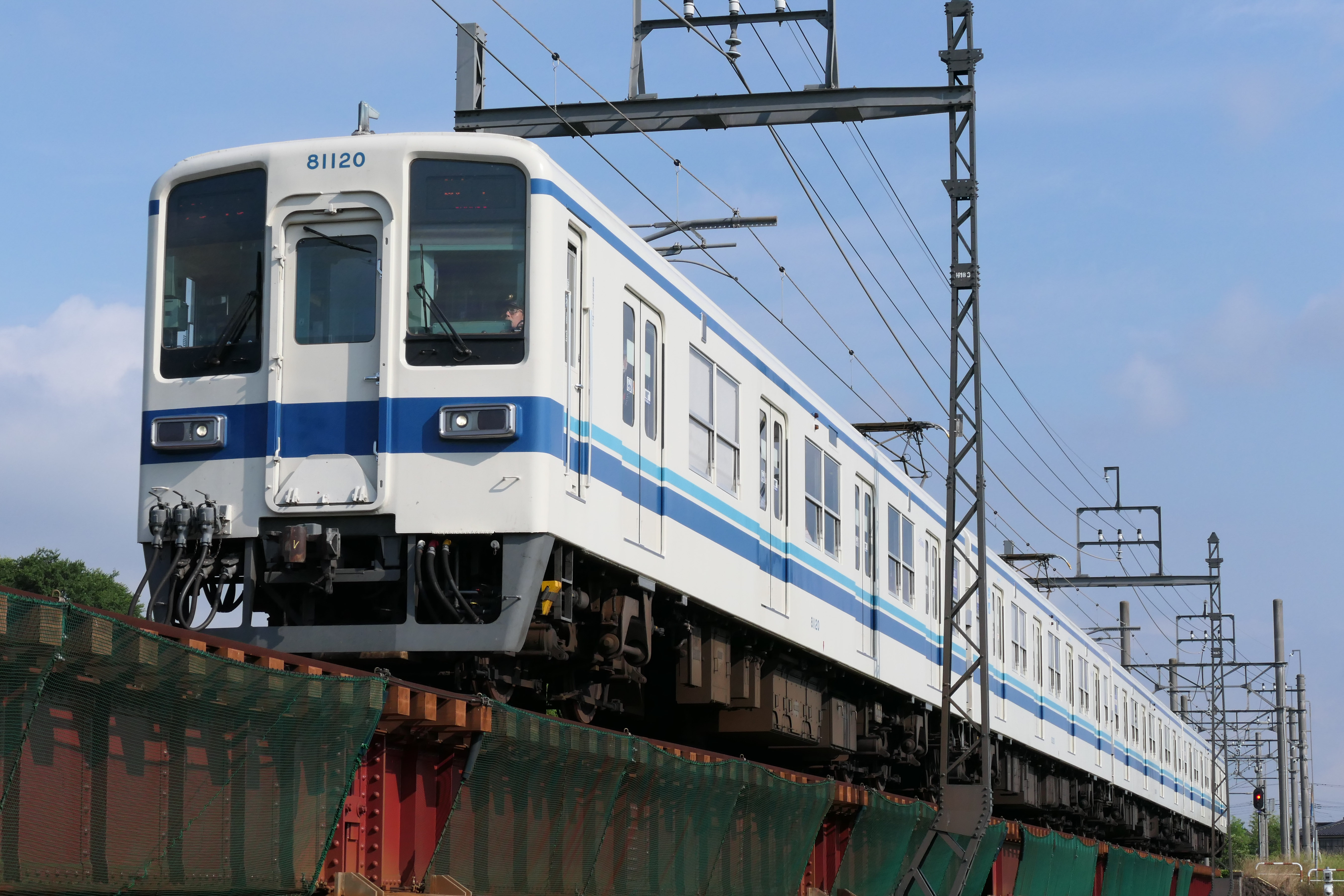
A refurbished four-car set on an Ogose Line service, with external speakers visible, in June 2019

From the start of the revised timetable on 14 June 2008, only refurbished four-car driver-only-operation sets are used on the Tobu Ogose Line. These are also stationed in Shinrinkōen, and five sets are required every day.

== History ==
=== Production ===
The first 8000 series appeared in November 1963 as four-car sets. These were joined from December 1964 by two-car sets (formed MoHa8500 + KuHa8600). Between 1971 and 1972, 14 pairs of additional intermediate cars (SaHa8700 + MoHa8800) were built and inserted into four-car sets 8101 to 8114 to lengthen them to six cars. 8000 series trains built up to this point were not equipped with air-conditioning, but from June 1972, three 6-car air-conditioned sets (8156 to 8158) were delivered. The originally non-fitted sets were also modified with air-conditioning from October 1973 until 1983 at the Alna Kōki (now Alna Sharyō) factory in Osaka and Tsuha Sharyō factory in Nishiarai, Tokyo.

In May 1977, the first eight-car 8000 series set (8173) was delivered for use on the Tojo Line.

October 1979 saw the last two digits of individual car running numbers exceed 99, resulting in some cars receiving five-digit (8xxxx) running numbers.

The last two sets built, 81120 and 8580, were delivered in 1983.

The fleet changes between 1963, when the first sets were built, and 1983, when construction ended, are shown below.

Fiscal year	2-car sets	4-car sets	6-car sets	8-car sets	Total vehicles
1963	0	15	0	0	60
1964	8	15	0	0	76
1965	21	21	0	0	126
1966	27	27	0	0	162
1967	39	36	0	0	222
1968	47	43	0	0	266
1969	58	51	0	0	320
1970	62	55	0	0	344
1971	62	42	13	0	370
1972	62	41	17	0	390
1973	63	41	22	0	422
1974	68	41	25	0	450
1976	70	41	31	0	490
1977	70	41	31	5	530
1978	70	42	31	9	566
1979	70	42	31	14	606
1980	73	45	32	16	646
1981	75	47	33	16	664
1982	80	50	36	17	712

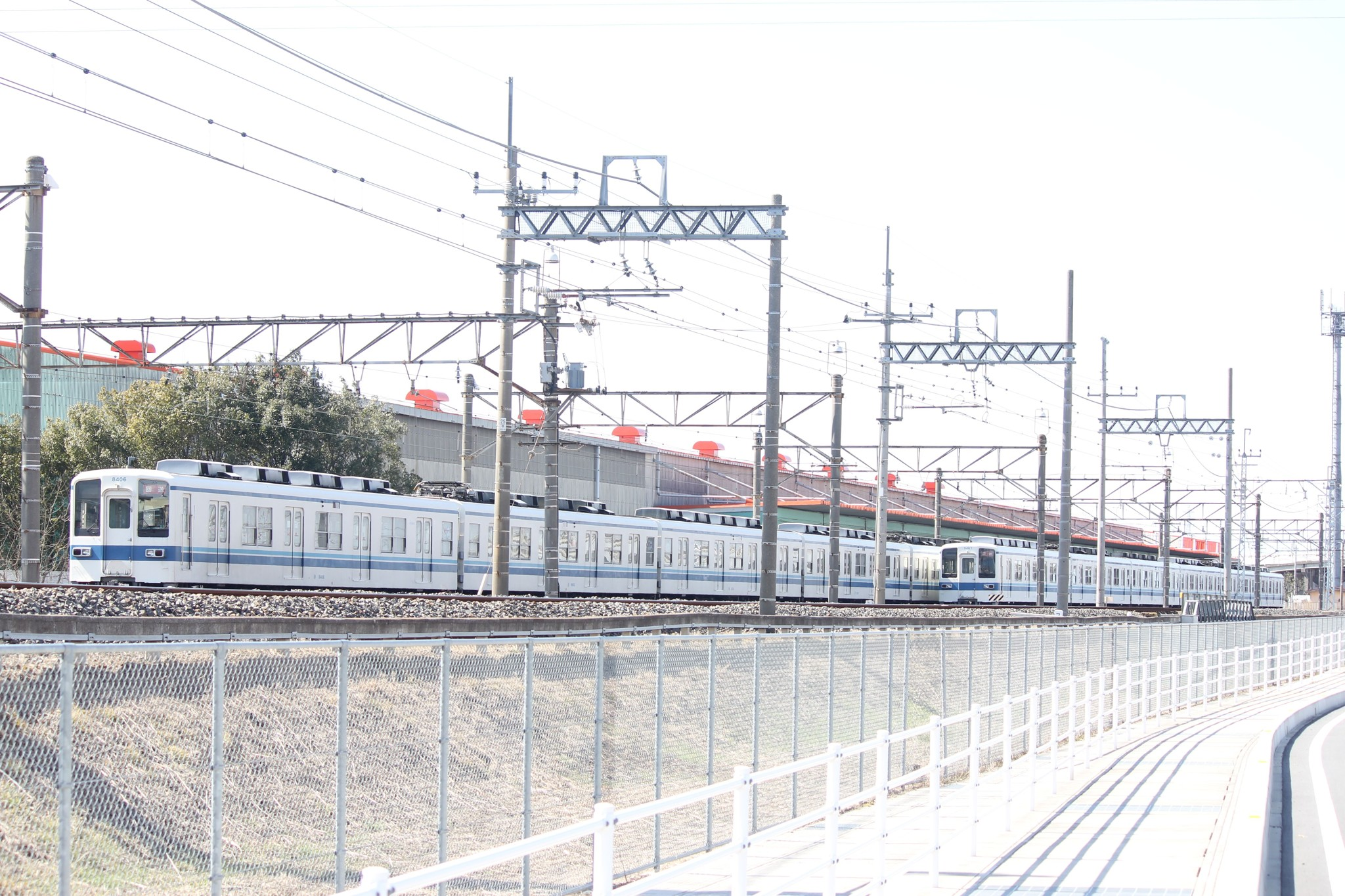
Two 8000 series sets awaiting cutting up at Kita-Tatebayashi in Gunma Prefecture in March 2014

The fleet changes from 2005, when withdrawals commenced, are shown below. (Including 800/850 series 3-car sets)

Fiscal year	2-car sets	3-car sets	4-car sets	6-car sets	8-car sets	Total vehicles
2005	70	10	40	46	12	702
2006	70	10	40	46	12	702
2007	66	10	51	44	6	678
2008	52	10	47	42	6	622
2009	37	10	42	41	5	558
2010	29	10	38	36	4	488
2011	28	10	31	34	3	438
2012	25	10	29	34	3	424

=== Refurbishment ===
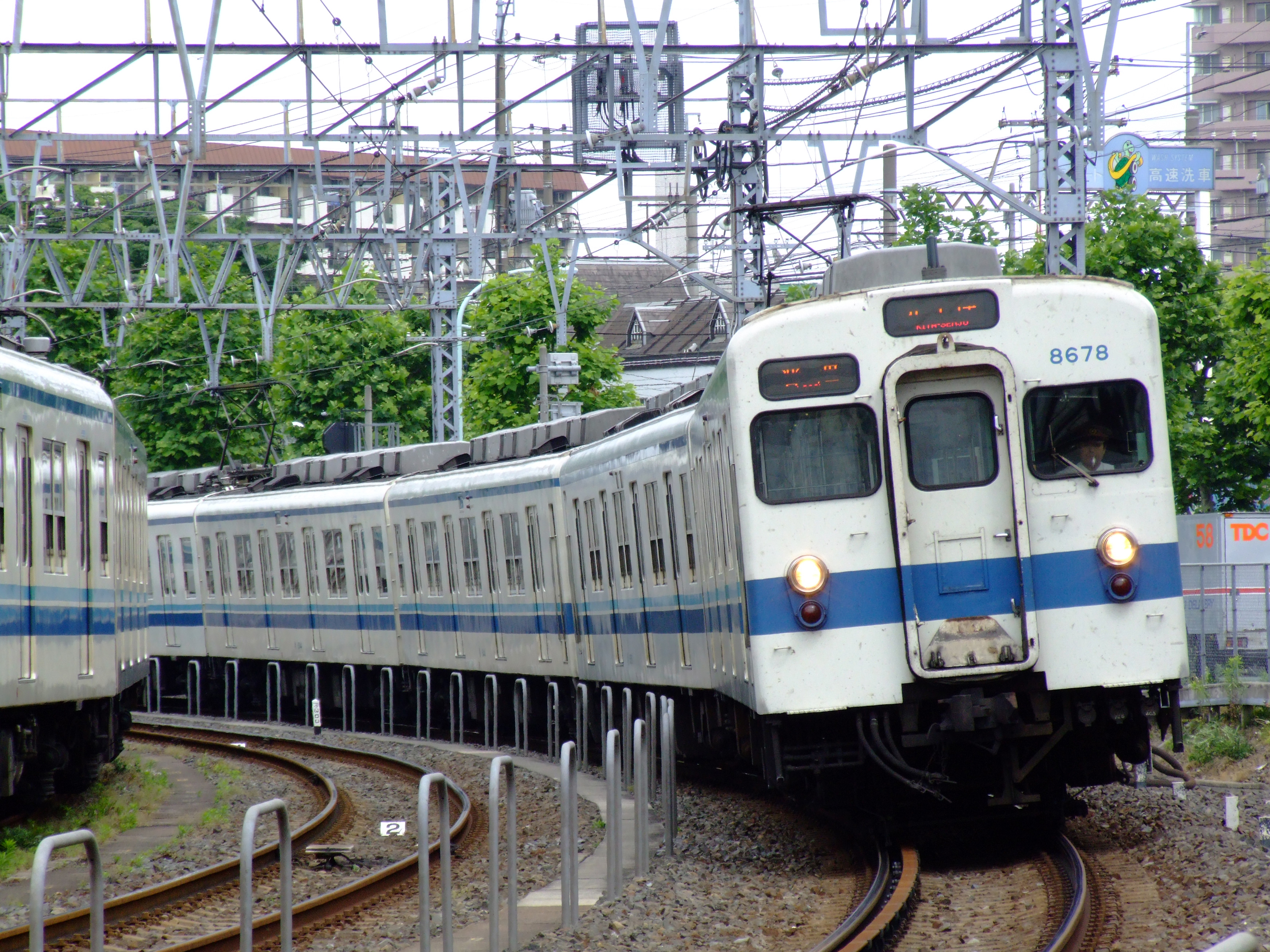
Unrefurbished 8000 series with original front end but with LED destination indicators, June 2006

Life-extension refurbishment began in 1986, and sets treated from 1987 received redesigned cab ends based on the 6050 series design. Sets refurbished from 1997 onward received HID headlights and LED external destination indicators, replacing the original roller blind type.

2001 saw the first appearance of two-car sets modified for driver-only-operation. This included the addition of an automated bilingual (Japanese and English) passenger announcement system, internal LED passenger information displays, and external speakers.

Some of the remaining unrefurbished sets also received LED destination indicators.

=== 800 and 850 series conversion ===
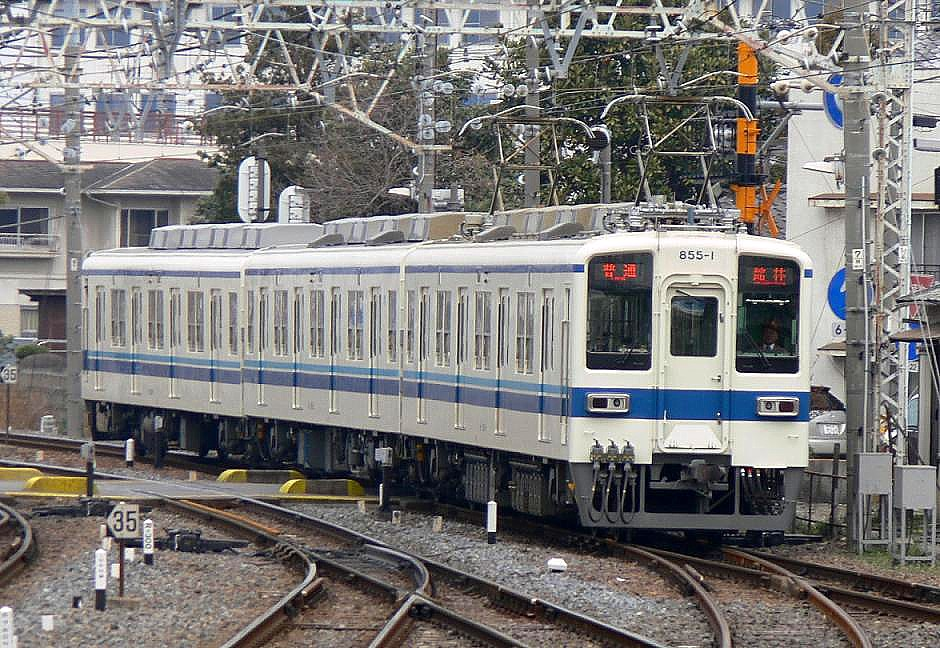
A three-car 850 series train at Tatebayashi Station in March 2006

From 2004, five eight-car sets were reformed to create pairs of three-car 800 and 850 series driver-only-operation sets for use on Sano and Kiryu Line services. This conversion involved adding new cabs to former MoHa8300 and MoHa8200 intermediate cars.

The new sets are formed as follows.

==== 800 series ====
- KuHa800-1
- MoHa800-2 (with two pantographs)
- MoHa800-3

==== 850 series ====
- MoHa850-1 (with two pantographs)
- MoHa850-2
- KuHa850-3

== Livery changes ==
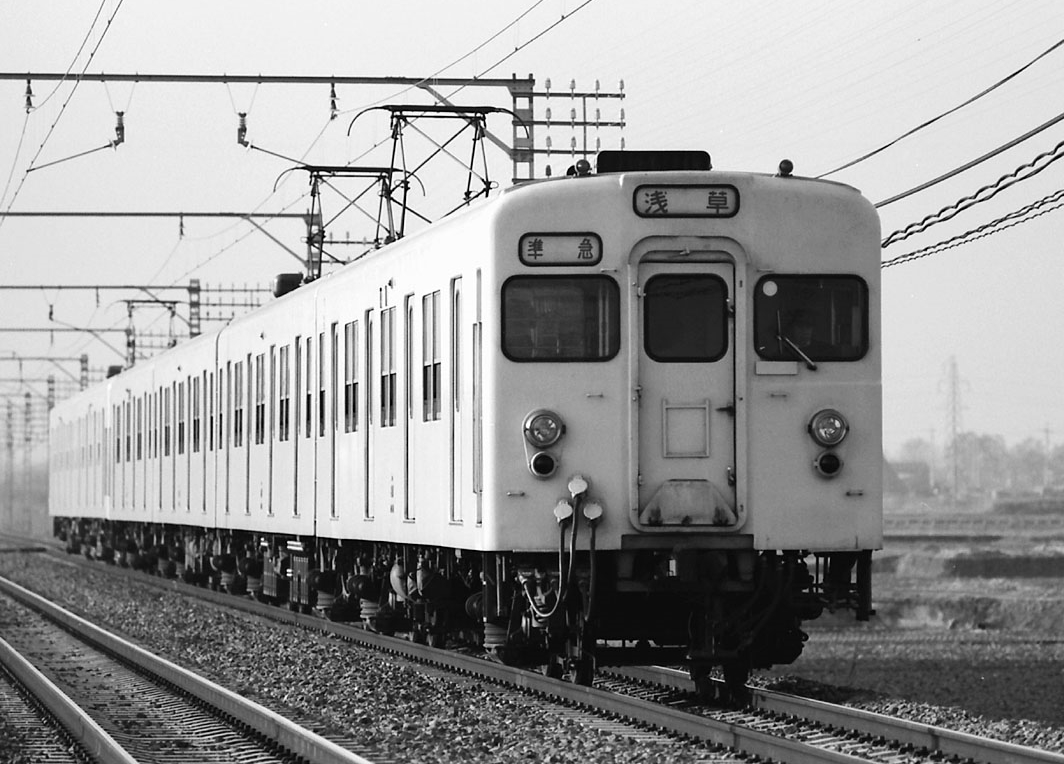
An 8000 series set in "sage cream" livery in 1977

When first built, the 8000 series sets were finished in a livery of "royal beige" and "international orange". From May 1974, sets were repainted into a simpler all-over livery of "sage cream". From 1985, sets were repainted into a new livery of "jasmine white" with dark and light blue bodyside stripes.

=== Commemorative liveries ===
One six-car set, 8108, was repainted into the original beige and orange livery between October 2004 and June 2005 to mark the 90th anniversary of the Tojo Line. This unit was subsequently returned to standard livery following overhaul in July 2005.

In August 2012, six-car set 8111, preserved in running order by the Tobu Museum, was repainted into its original "royal beige" and "international orange" livery for a series of special event runs.

In March 2014, to mark the 100th anniversary of the opening of the Tobu Tojo Line, four-car set 81111, based at Shinrinkoen Depot, was repainted into the all-over "sage cream" livery carried by sets from the 1970s. This set operates on Tobu Tojo Line services between Ogawamachi and Yorii, and on Tobu Ogose Line services between Sakado and Ogose.

In November 2014, four-car set 81107, based at Shinrinkoen Depot, was repainted into the original "royal beige" and "international orange" livery.

From 28 November 2015, four-car set 8198, based at Shinrinkoen Depot, was repainted into the dark blue with yellow stripe livery carried by 54 series and 53 series EMUs used on Flying Tojo limited express services on the Tobu Tojo Line during the 1950s.

From 23 March 2016, two-car set 8577, used on the Tobu Kameido Line and Tobu Daishi Line, received the "international orange" and "medium yellow" livery carried by 7300 and 7800 series trains between 1958 and 1964.

Preserved six-car set 8111 was repainted from its "royal beige" and "international orange" livery into all-over "sage cream" livery in August 2016.

From 16 February 2017, two-car set 8568, used on the Tobu Kameido Line and Tobu Daishi Line, received the green and "jasmine white" livery carried experimentally by one 7860 series train in the 1950s.

From 13 July 2017, two-car set 8575, used on the Tobu Kameido Line and Tobu Daishi Line, received the yellow and orange livery carried experimentally by a 7800 series train in the 1950s.

In September 2023, set 8111 was once again repainted into its original livery. It subsequently re-entered service on the Urban Park Line on 1 November 2023.

To commemorate the 100th anniversary of the Tojo Line's extension to Yorii, four-car set 81111 received an all-over burgundy livery, dubbed "Grape No. 1", inspired by that of the passenger rolling stock used at that time. It returned to service on 13 July 2025.

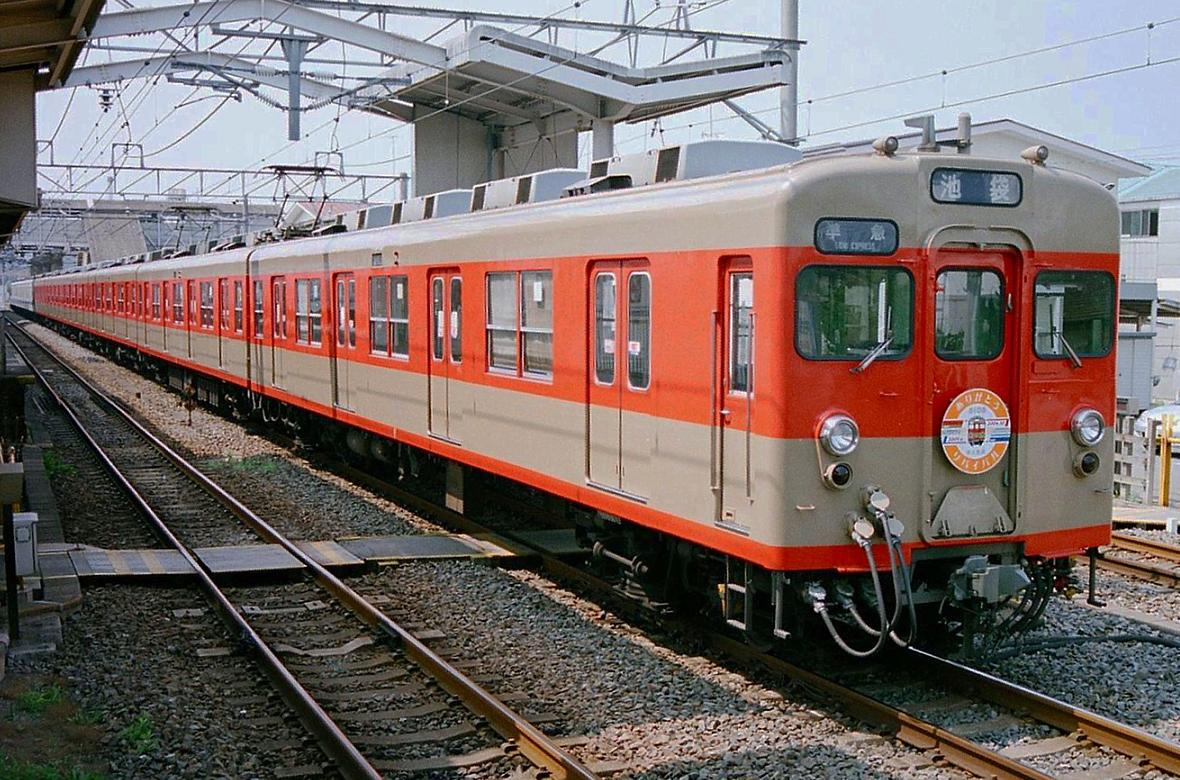
Set 8108 repainted in original beige and orange livery in June 2005

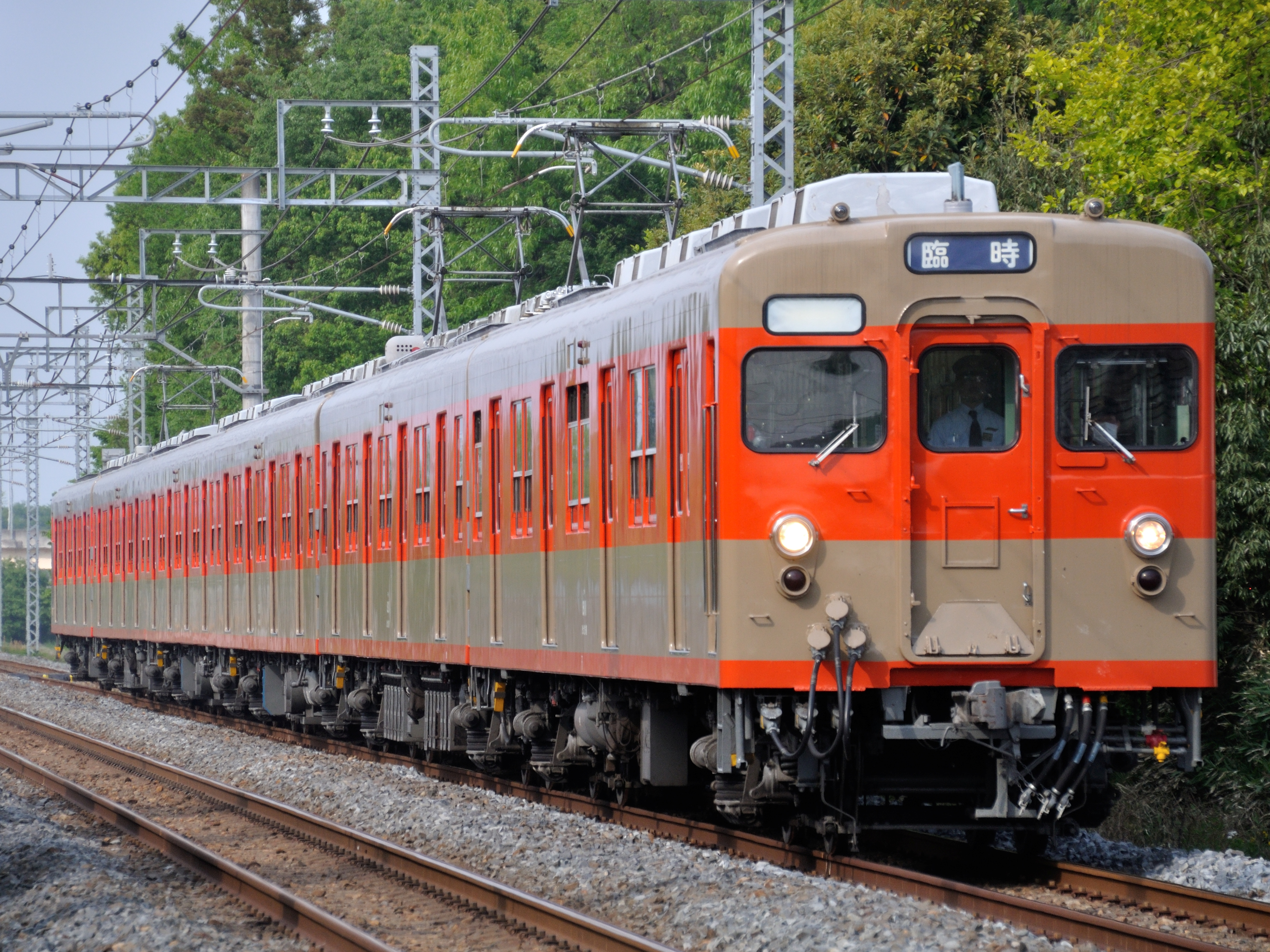
Preserved set 8111 in May 2013

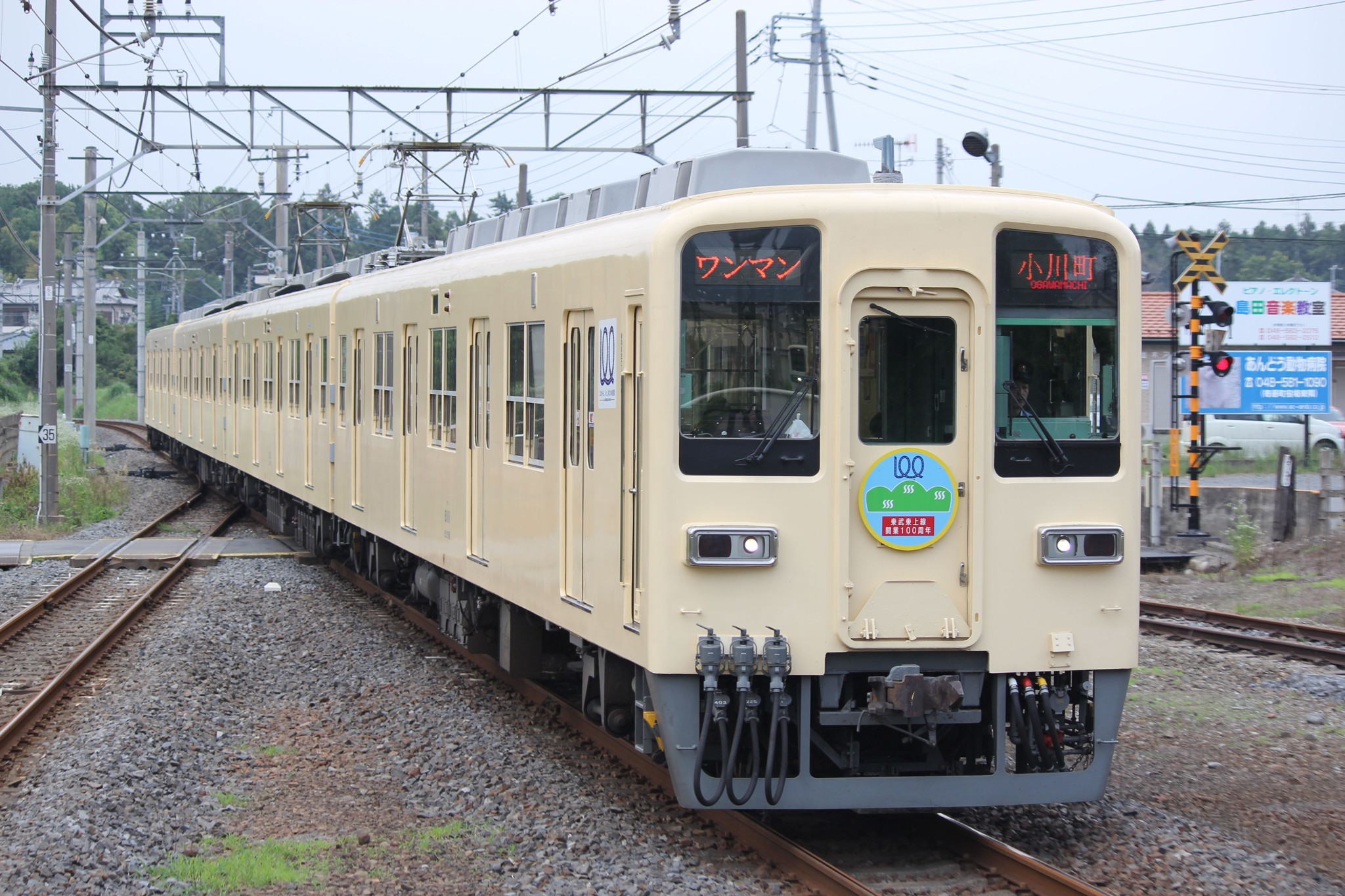
Set 81111 in "sage cream" livery in June 2014

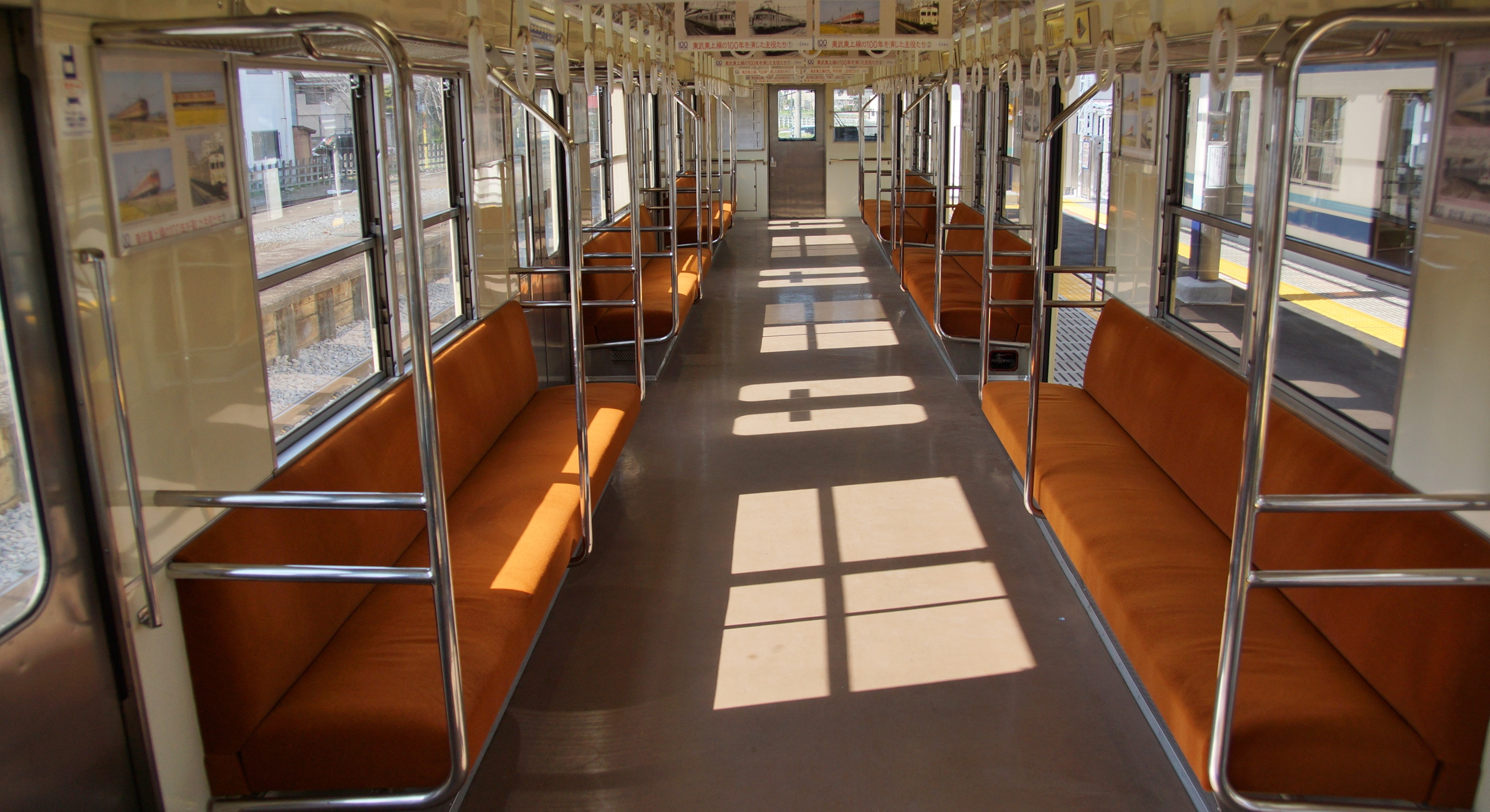
Interior of reliveried set 81111 with original colour seat covers in April 2014

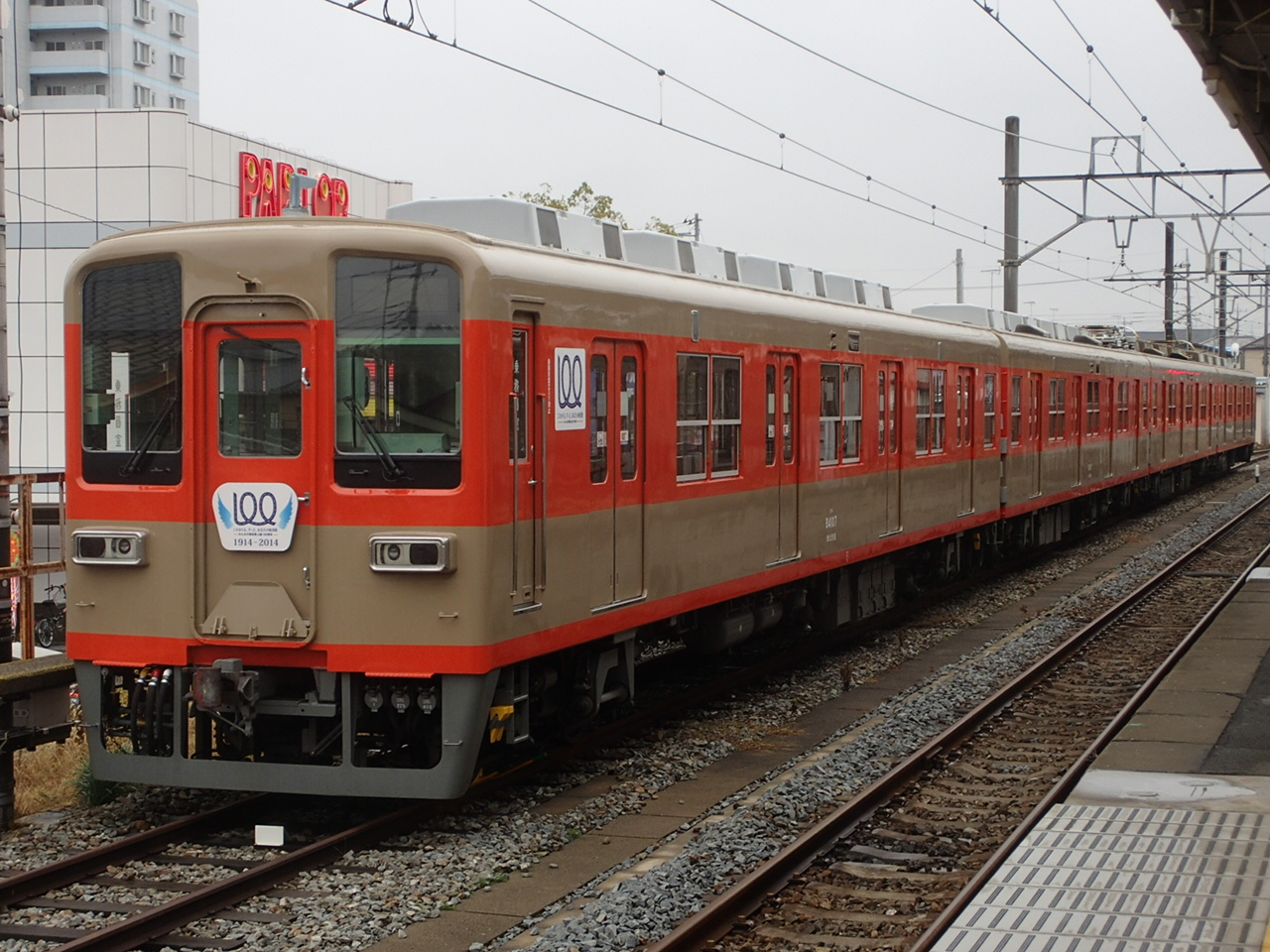
Set 81107 repainted in original beige and orange livery in December 2014

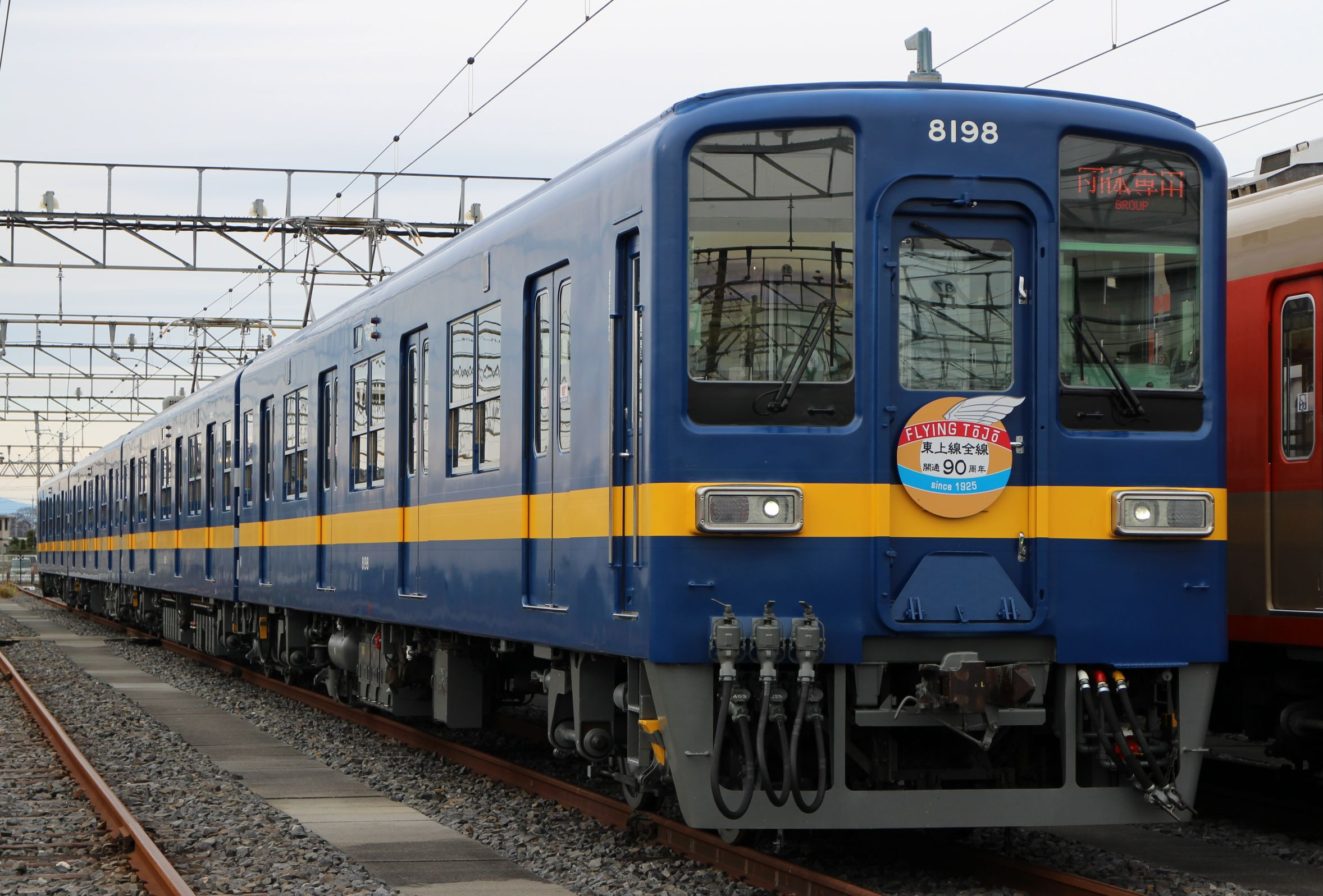
Set 8198 in blue and yellow "Flying Tojo" livery in December 2015

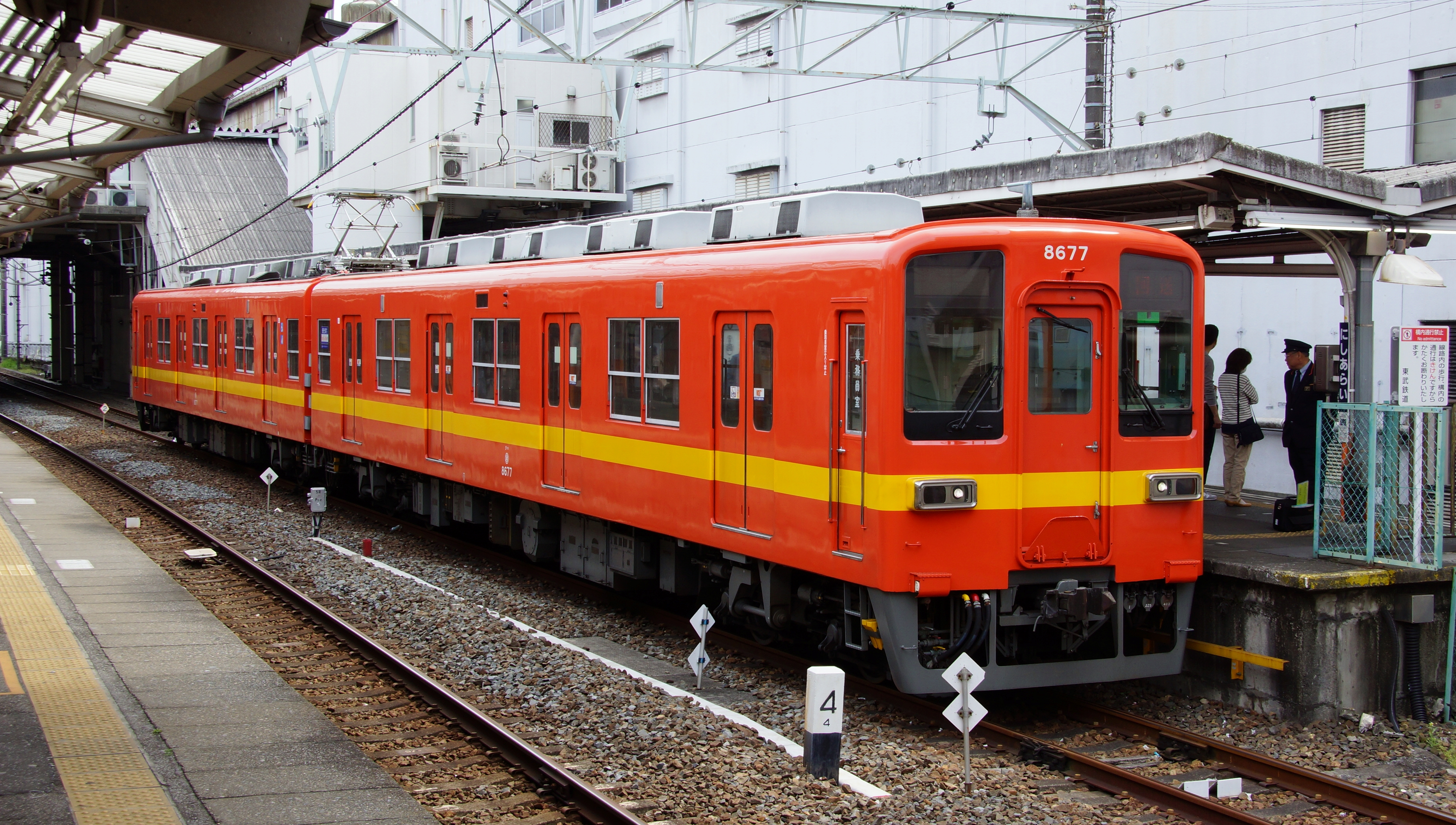
Two-car set 8577 in orange and yellow livery in April 2016

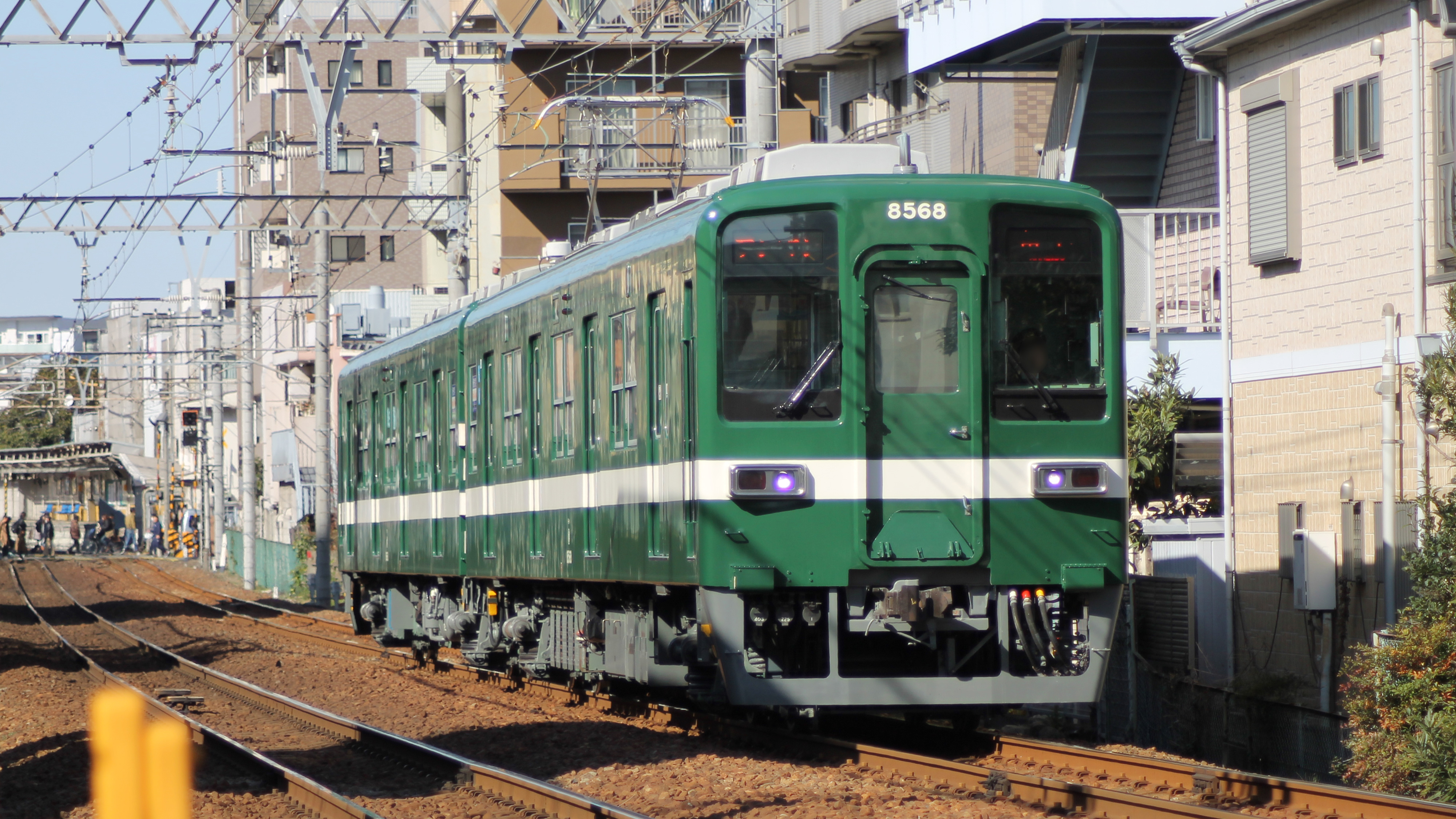
Two-car set 8568 in green and white livery in February 2017

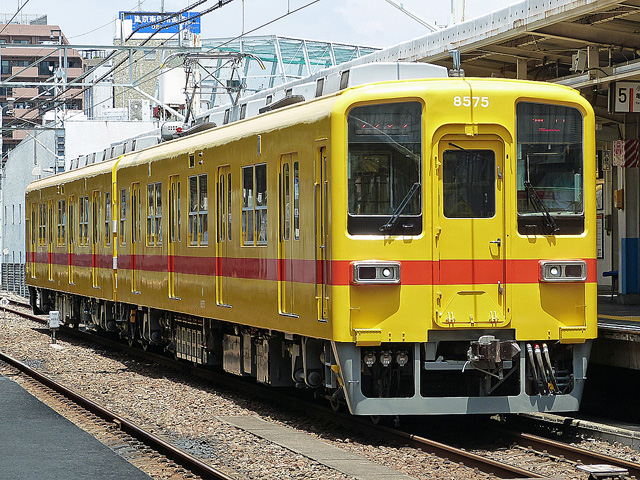
Two-car set 8575 in experimental yellow and orange livery in July 2017
