= Hatsuishi Station =

Railway station in Nagareyama, Chiba Prefecture, Japan

TD21 Hatsuishi Station 初石駅
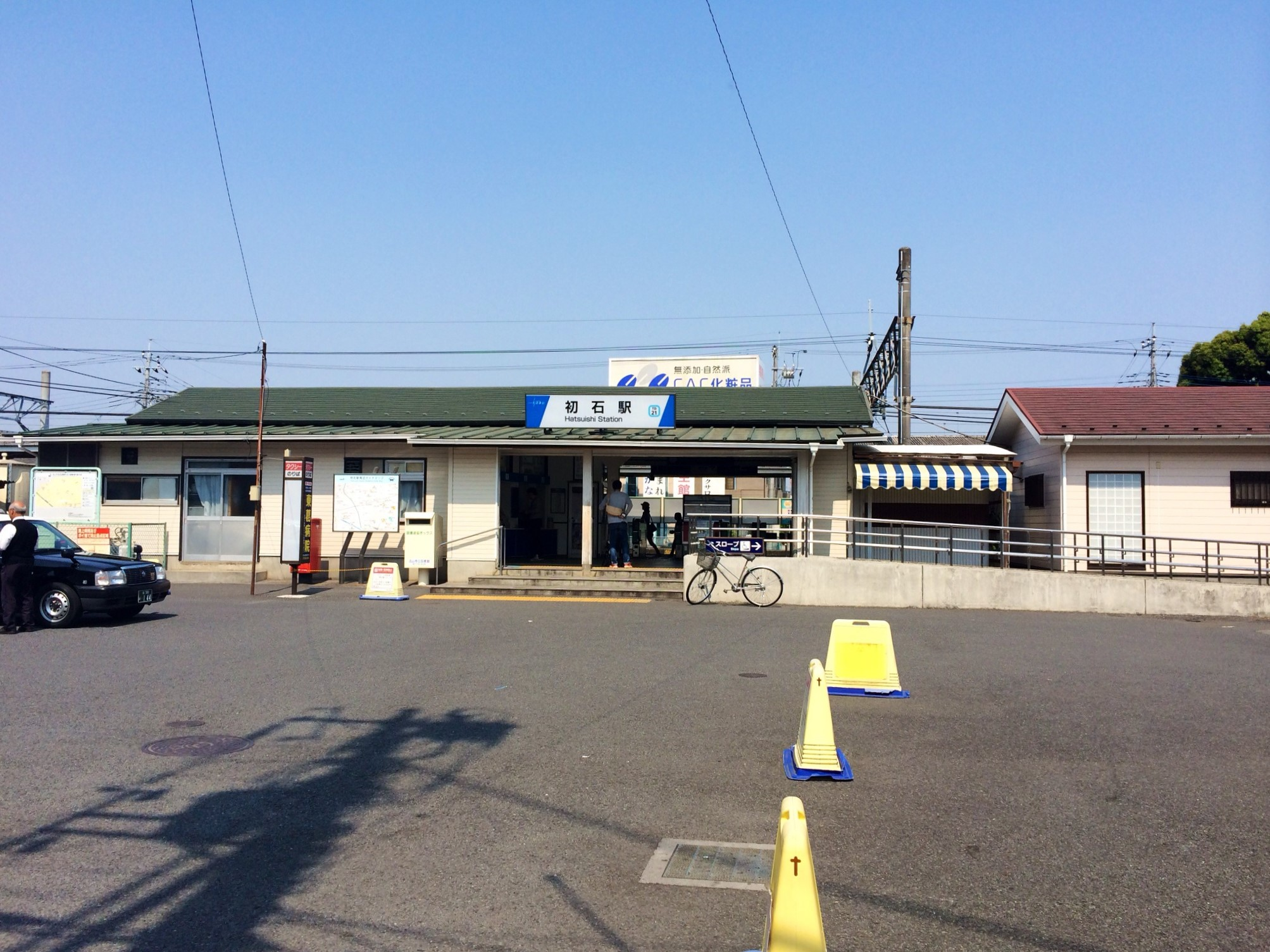
- Hatsuishi Station in May 2016

General information
- Location: 3-100 Nishi-Hatsuishi, Nagareyama-shi, Chiba-ken 270-0121; Japan
- Coordinates: 35.8836°N 139.9176°E
- Operator: Tobu Railway
- Line: Tobu Urban Park Line
- Distance: 36.8 km from Ōmiya
- Platforms: 2 side platforms
- Tracks: 2

Other information
- Station code: TD-21
- Website: www.tobu.co.jp/station/info/6308.html

History
- Opened: 9 May 1911; 115 years ago

Passengers
- FY2018: 18,653 daily

Services
Preceding station	Tobu Railway	Following station
Edogawadai TD20 towards Ōmiya	Tōbu Urban Park Line Section Express	Nagareyama-ōtakanomori TD22 towards Kashiwa
Edogawadai TD20 towards Ōmiya	Tōbu Urban Park Line Local	Nagareyama-ōtakanomori TD22 towards Funabashi
Location
- Location within Chiba Prefecture Location within Japan

Hatsuishi Station (初石駅, Hatsuishi-eki) is a passenger railway station in the city of Nagareyama, Chiba, Japan, operated by the private railway operator Tōbu Railway.

== Lines ==
Hatsuishi Station is served by the 62.7 km (39.0 mi) Tobu Urban Park Line from Ōmiya in Saitama Prefecture to Funabashi in Chiba Prefecture, and lies 36.8 km (22.9 mi) from the western terminus of the line at Ōmiya.

== Station layout ==
The station consists of two opposed side platforms serving two tracks, connected by a footbridge.

=== Platforms ===
1	■ Tobu Urban Park Line	for Nodashi, Kasukabe, Iwatsuki, and Ōmiya
2	■ Tobu Urban Park Line	for Kashiwa and Funabashi

== History ==
Hatsuishi Station opened on 9 May 1911. From 17 March 2012, station numbering was introduced on all Tobu lines, with Hatsuishi Station becoming "TD-21".

== Passenger statistics ==
In fiscal 2018, the station was used by an average of 18,653 passengers daily.

== Surrounding area ==
- Hatsuishi Elementary School
- Hatsuishi Junior High School
- Nagareyama High School
- Nagareyama Otakanomori High School

== See also ==
- List of railway stations in Japan
