= Umesato Station =

Railway station in Noda, Chiba Prefecture, Japan

TD18 Umesato Station 梅郷駅
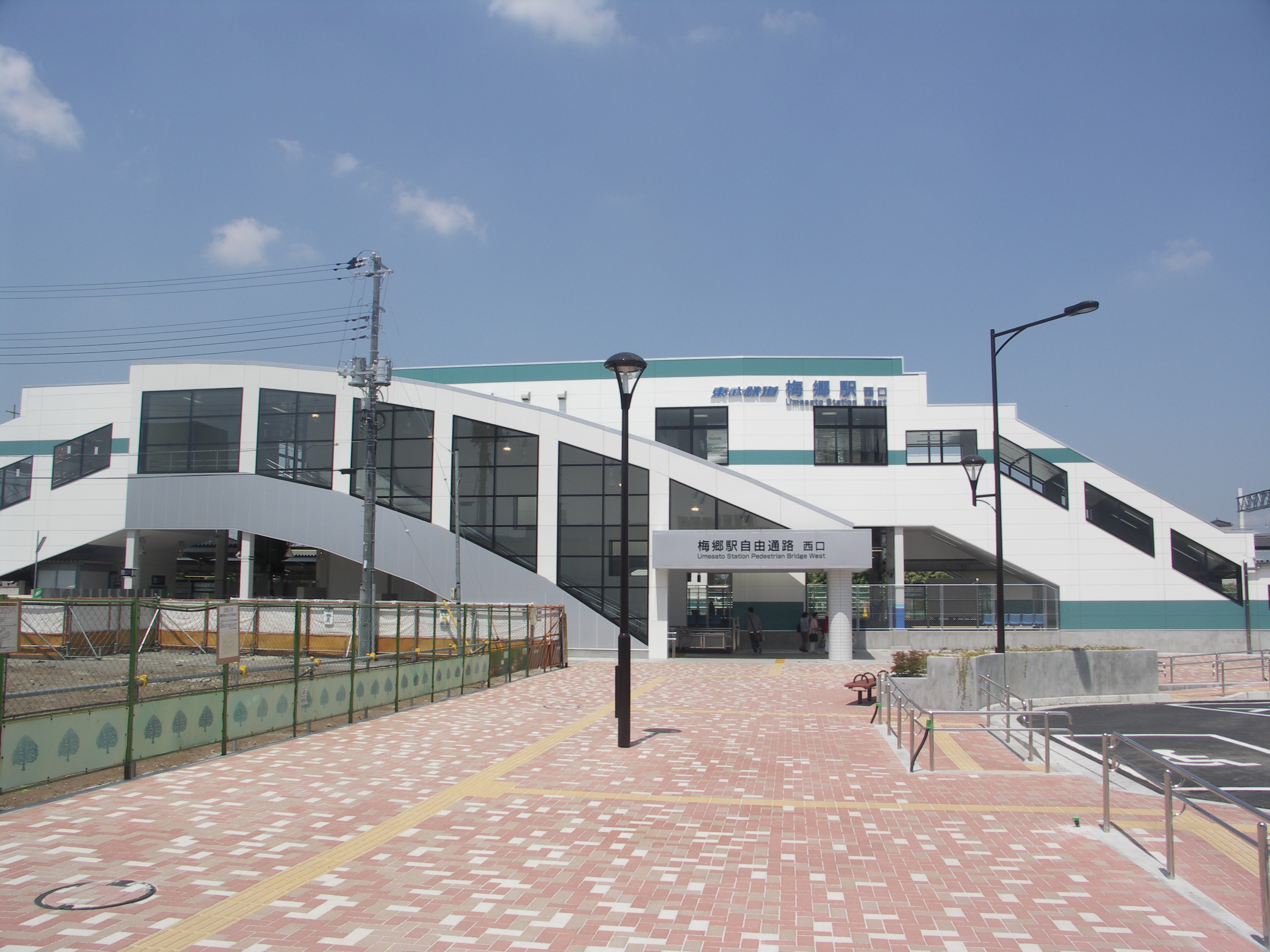
- Umesato Station

General information
- Location: 1892 Yamazaki, Noda-shi, Chiba-ken 278-0022; Japan
- Coordinates: 35.9316°N 139.8913°E
- Operator: Tobu Railway
- Line: Tobu Urban Park Line
- Distance: 30.9 km from Ōmiya
- Platforms: 2 side platforms
- Tracks: 2

Other information
- Station code: TD-18
- Website: Official website

History
- Opened: 9 May 1911; 115 years ago

Passengers
- FY2019: 17,375 daily

Services
Preceding station	Tobu Railway	Following station
Nodashi TD17 towards Ōmiya	Urban Park Liner	Unga TD19 towards Kashiwa
Nodashi One-way operation	Urban Park Liner from Asakusa	Unga TD19 towards Kashiwa
Nodashi TD17 towards Ōmiya	Tōbu Urban Park Line Express	Unga TD19 towards Funabashi
Nodashi TD17 towards Ōmiya	Tōbu Urban Park Line Section Express	Unga TD19 towards Kashiwa
Nodashi TD17 towards Ōmiya	Tōbu Urban Park Line Local	Unga TD19 towards Funabashi
Location
- Location within Chiba Prefecture Location within Japan

Umesato Station (梅郷駅, Umesato-eki) is a railway station in the city of Noda, Chiba, Japan, operated by the private railway operator Tōbu Railway. The station is numbered "TD-18".

== Lines ==
Ōwada Station is served by the 62.7 km (39.0 mi) Tobu Urban Park Line (also known as the Tōbu Noda Line) from Ōmiya in Saitama Prefecture to Funabashi in Chiba Prefecture, and lies 30.9 km (19.2 mi) from the western terminus of the line at Ōmiya.

== Station layout ==
The station consists of two opposed side platforms serving two tracks, connected to the station building by a footbridge.

=== Platforms ===
1	■ Tobu Urban Park Line	For Nodashi, Kasukabe, Ōmiya
2	■ Tobu Urban Park Line	For Kashiwa, Funabashi

== History ==
Umesato Station was opened on 9 May 1911. A new station building was completed in May 2007.

== Passenger statistics ==
In fiscal 2018, the station was used by an average of 17,375 passengers daily.

== Surrounding area ==
- National Route 16
- Nambu Industrial Park
- Noda South Community Center
