= Nagareyama-ōtakanomori Station =

Railway station in Nagareyama, Chiba Prefecture, Japan

TD22 Nagareyama-ōtakanomori Station 流山おおたかの森駅
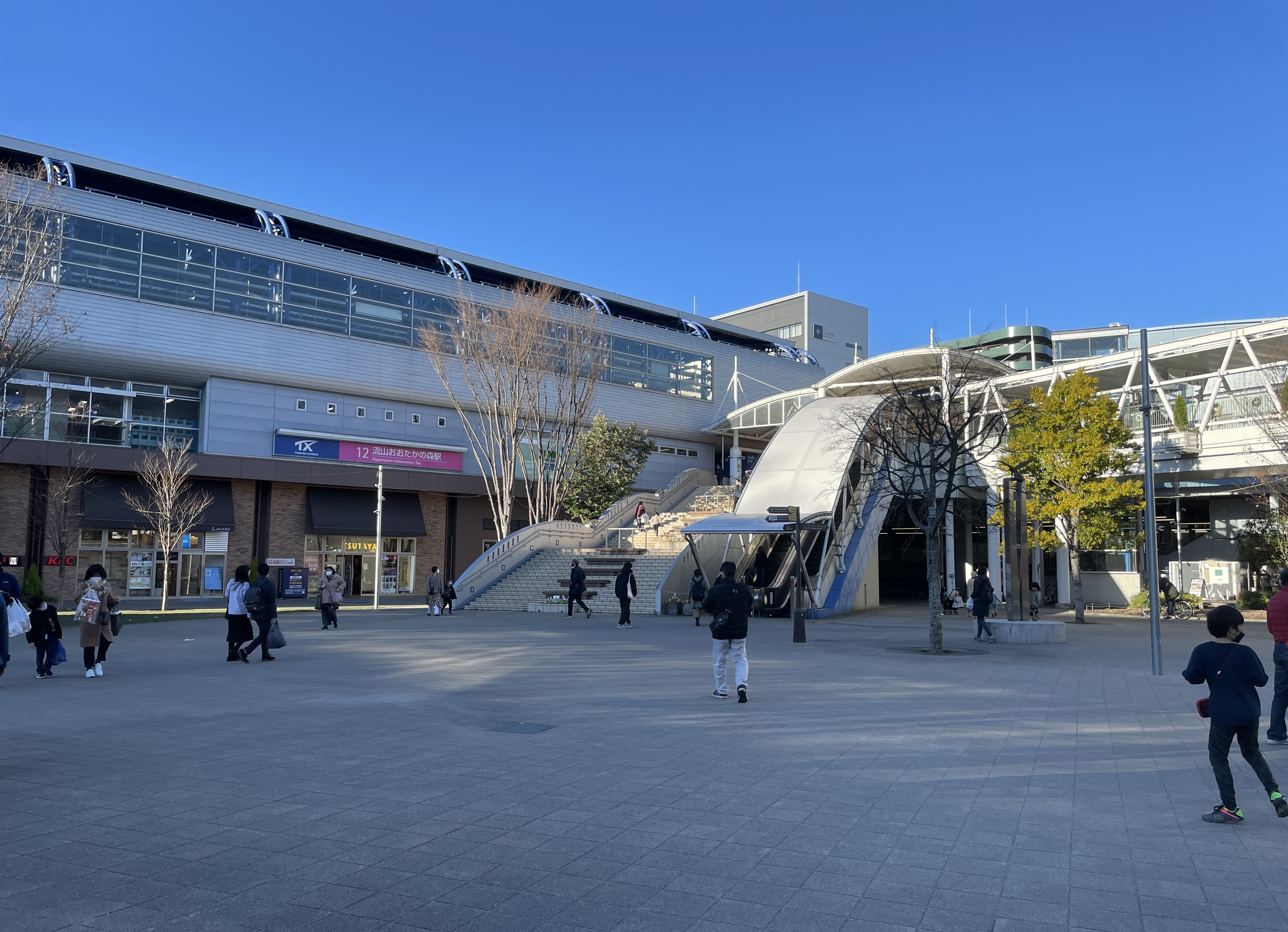
- Nagareyama-ōtakanomori Station, December 2022

General information
- Location: 1-1-1 Otakanomori-nishi (TX); 1-1-1 Otakanomori-higashi (Tobu), Nagareyama-shi, Chiba-ken 270-0128/270-0138; Japan
- Coordinates: 35°52′18.4116″N 139°55′30.0288″E
- Operator: Tobu Railway; Metropolitan Intercity Railway Company
- Lines: Tobu Urban Park Line; Tsukuba Express (TX)
- Platforms: 6 (2 island platforms, 2 side platforms)
- Tracks: 6

Construction
- Structure type: At-grade (Tobu); Elevated (Tsukuba Express)
- Accessible: Yes

Other information
- Station code: TD-22 (Tobu); TX12 (Tsukuba Express)

History
- Opened: 24 August 2005; 21 years ago

Passengers
- FY2018: 58,635 daily (Tobu); 38,194 daily (TX)

Services
Preceding station	Tobu Railway	Following station
Unga TD19 towards Ōmiya	Urban Park Liner	Kashiwa TD24 Terminus
Unga One-way operation	Urban Park Liner from Asakusa	Kashiwa TD24 Terminus
Unga TD19 towards Ōmiya	Tōbu Urban Park Line Express	Kashiwa TD24 towards Funabashi
Hatsuishi TD21 towards Ōmiya	Tōbu Urban Park Line Section Express	Toyoshiki TD23 towards Kashiwa
Hatsuishi TD21 towards Ōmiya	Tōbu Urban Park Line Local	Toyoshiki TD23 towards Funabashi
Preceding station	Tsukuba Express	Following station
Minami-Nagareyama (TX10) towards Akihabara	Tsukuba Express Rapid	Moriya (TX15) towards Tsukuba
Minami-Nagareyama (TX10) towards Akihabara	Tsukuba Express Commuter-Rapid Semi-Rapid	Kashiwanoha-campus (TX13) towards Tsukuba
Nagareyama-centralpark (TX11) towards Akihabara	Tsukuba Express Local	Kashiwanoha-campus (TX13) towards Tsukuba
Location
- Location within Chiba Prefecture Location within Japan

Nagareyama-ōtakanomori Station (流山おおたかの森駅, Nagareyama-ōtakanomori-eki) is an interchange passenger railway station in the city of Nagareyama, Chiba, Japan, operated jointly by the private railway operator Tōbu Railway (as an infill station) and the third-sector railway operating company Metropolitan Intercity Railway Company.

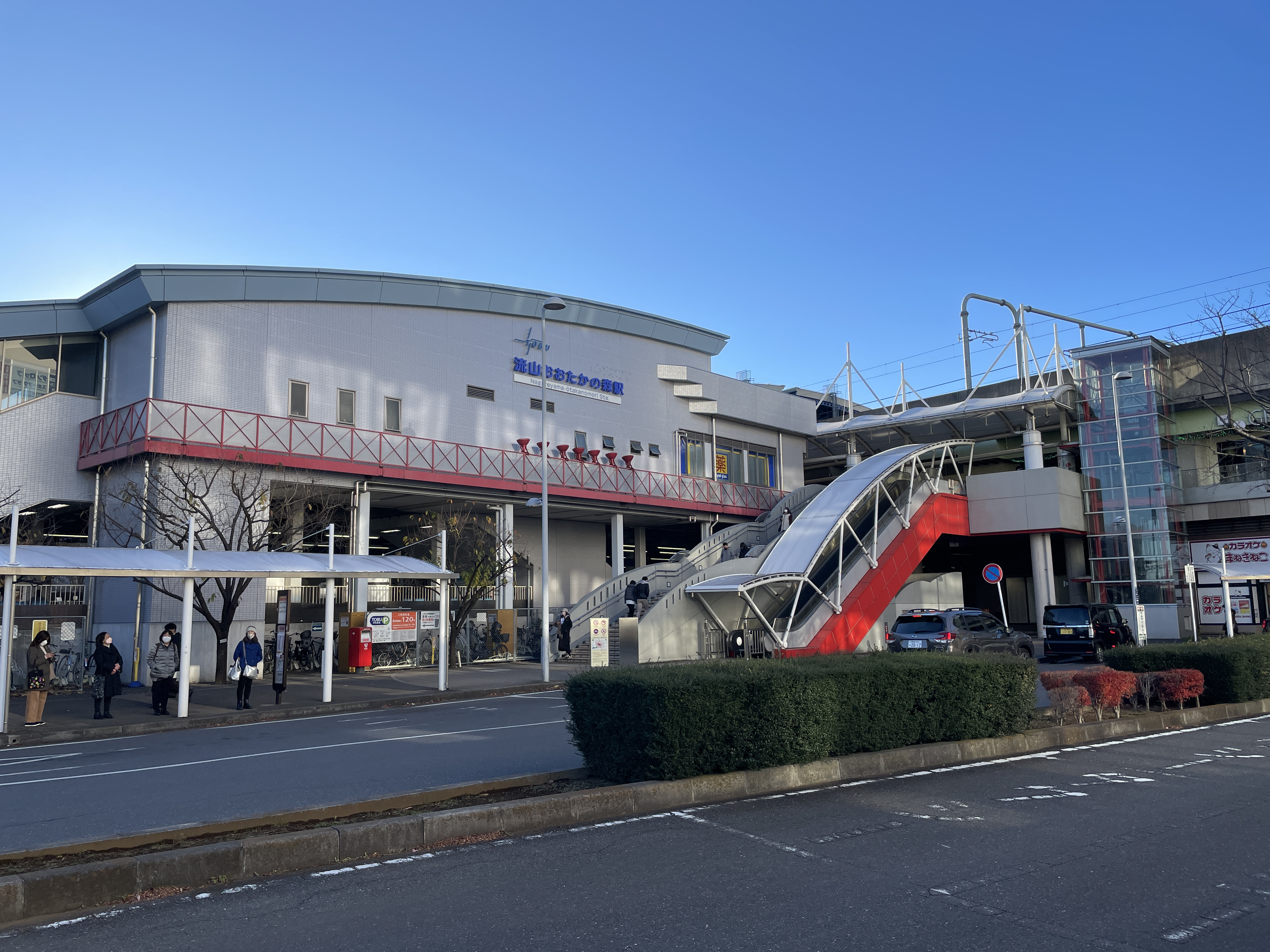
East Exit in December 2022

== Lines ==
The station is served by the following two lines.

- Tobu Urban Park Line
- Tsukuba Express

It is located 38.4 km (23.9 mi) from the terminus of the Tobu Urban Park Line at Ōmiya Station, and 26.5 kilometres (16.5 mi) from the terminus of the Tsukuba Express at Akihabara Station.

== Station layout ==
Nagareyama-ōtakanomori Station has two opposed side platforms at ground level for the Tobu Urban Park Line, connected by a footbridge to the elevated station building above. The Tsukuba Express has two elevated island platforms built at a right angle to the Tōbu Line platforms, built above the station building. A walkway form the station connects it to the Forest of Nagareyama shopping mall.

=== Platforms ===
==== Tobu ====
1	Tōbu Urban Park Line	for Nodashi, Kasukabe, and Ōmiya
2	Tōbu Urban Park Line	for Kashiwa, Shin-Kamagaya, and Funabashi

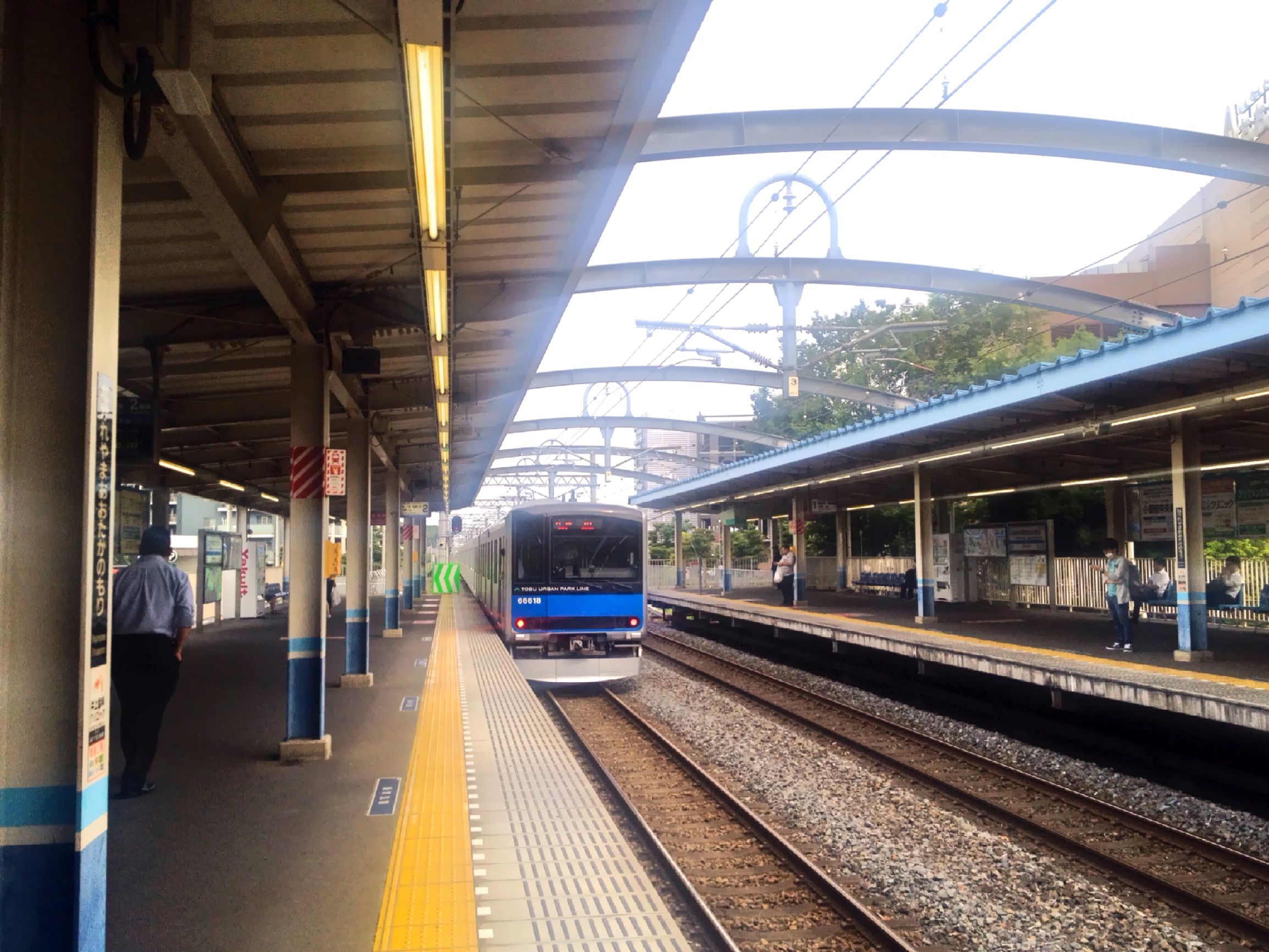
TOBU Line Platform

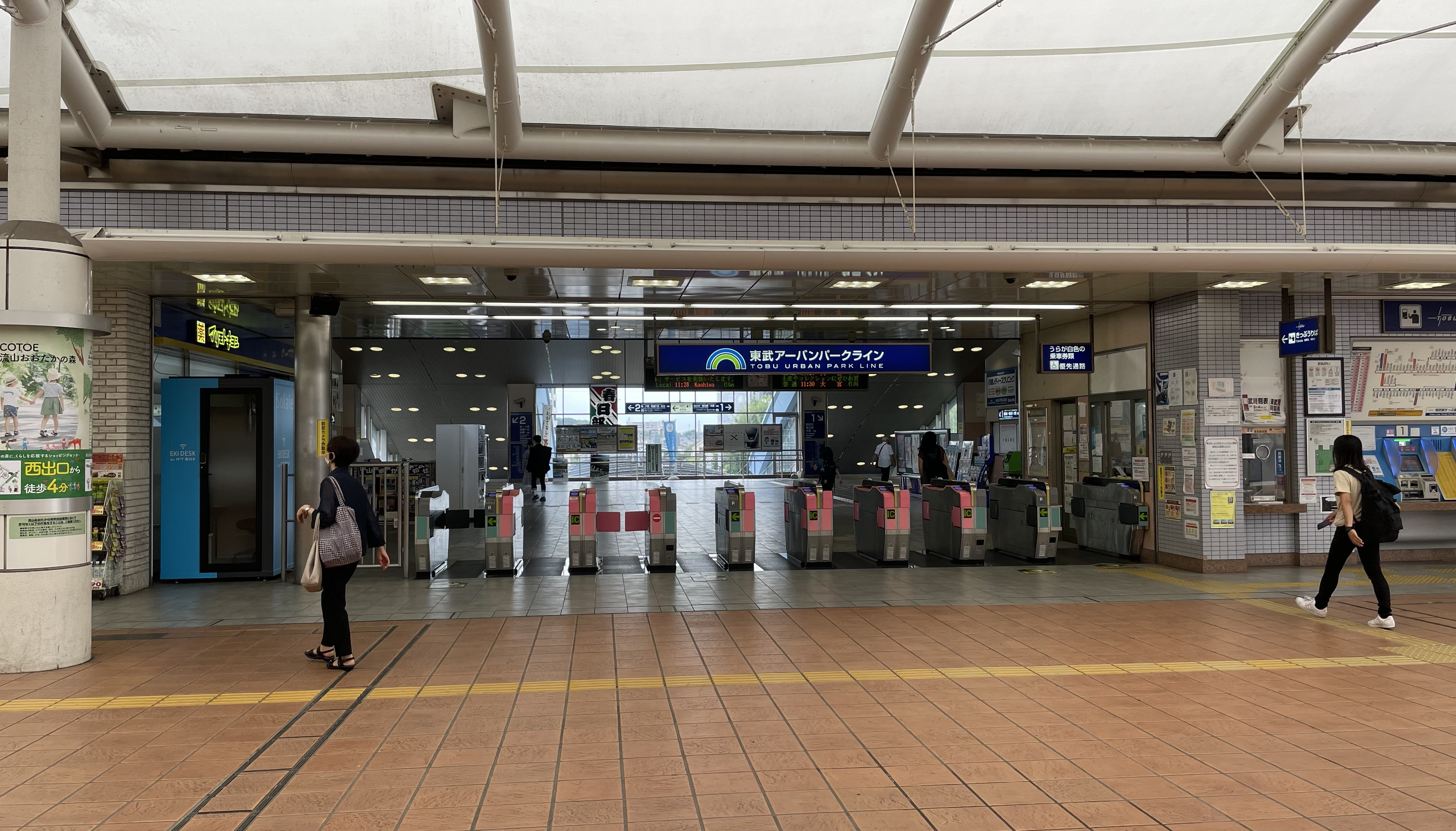
TOBU Line Gates

==== Metropolitan Intercity Railway ====
1, 2	■ Tsukuba Express	for Moriya and Tsukuba
3, 4	■ Tsukuba Express	for Kita-Senju, and Akihabara

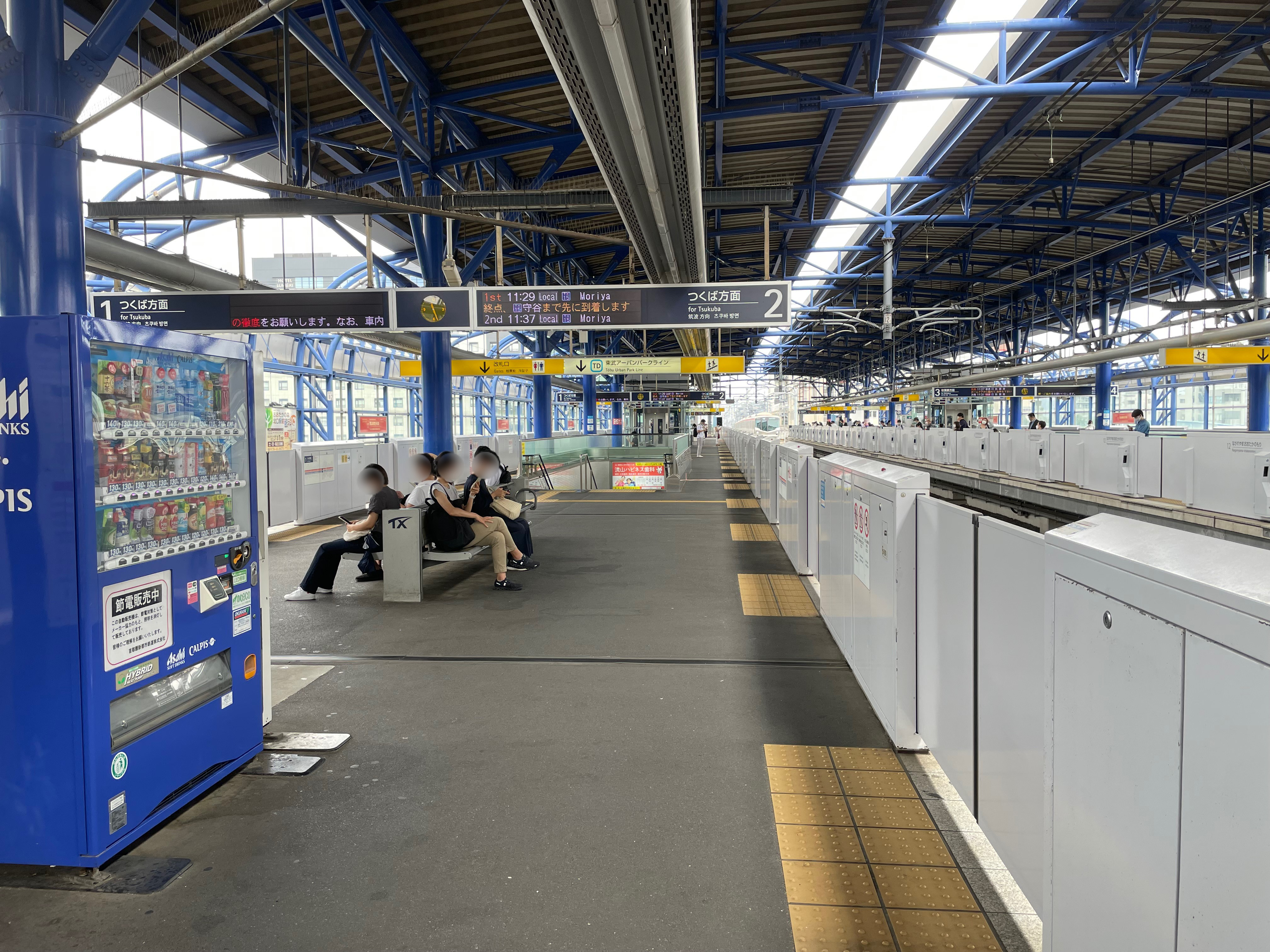
TX Line Platform

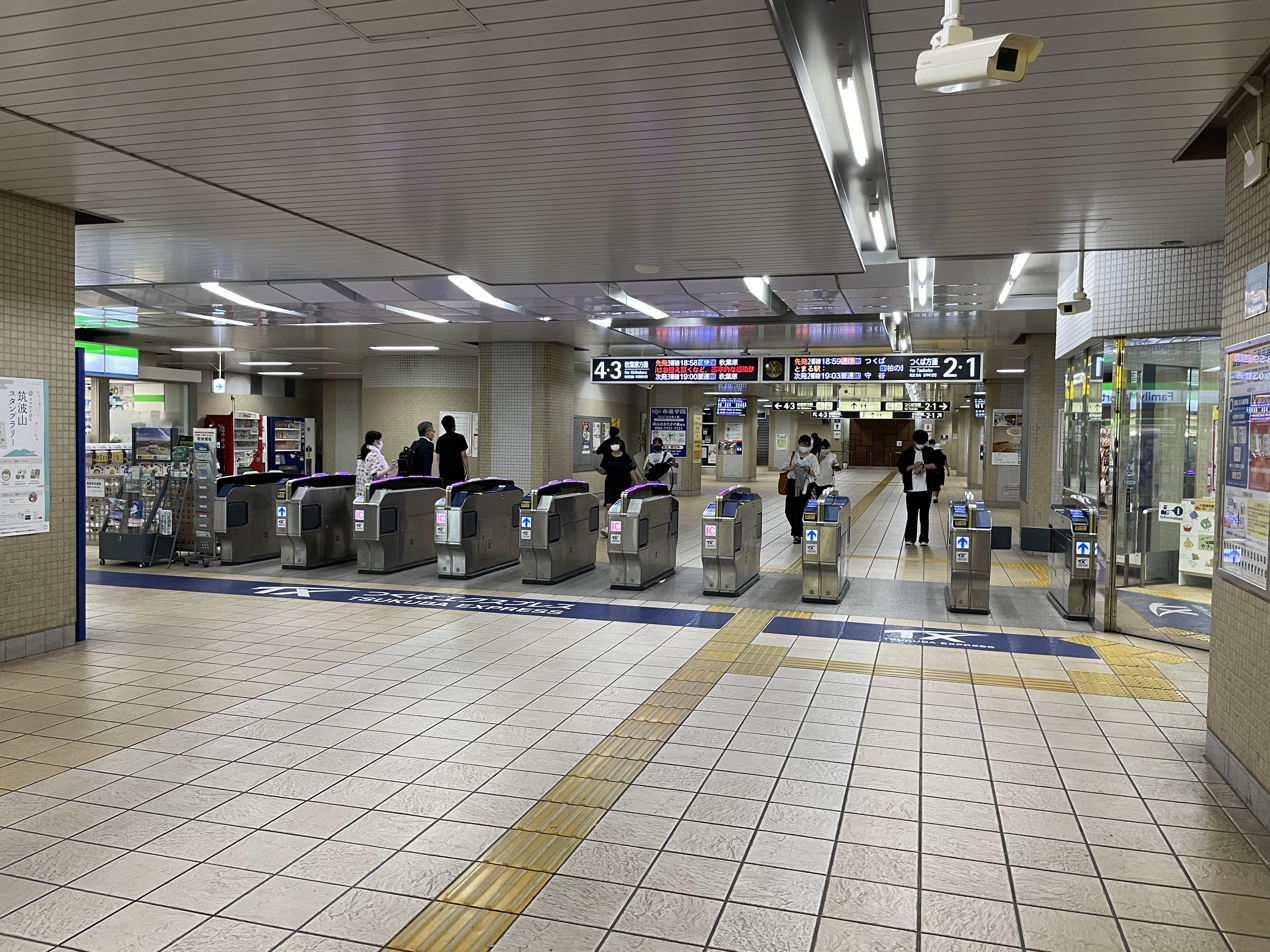
TX Line Gates

== History ==
The station opened on 24 August 2005, coinciding with the opening of the Tsukuba Express line.

From 17 March 2012, station numbering was introduced on all Tōbu lines, with Nagareyama-ōtakanomori Station becoming "TD-22".

== Passenger statistics ==
In fiscal 2018, the Tobu Railway portion of the station was used by an average of 58,635 passengers daily. The Tsukuba Express portion of the station was used by an average of 38,194 passengers (departing passengers only) during the same period.

== Surrounding area ==
- Edogawa University
- Nagareyama-ōtakanomori Shopping Center
- Nagareyama-ōtakanomori Post Office

== See also ==
- List of railway stations in Japan
