= Edogawadai Station =

Railway station in Nagareyama, Chiba Prefecture, Japan

TD20 Edogawadai Station 江戸川台駅
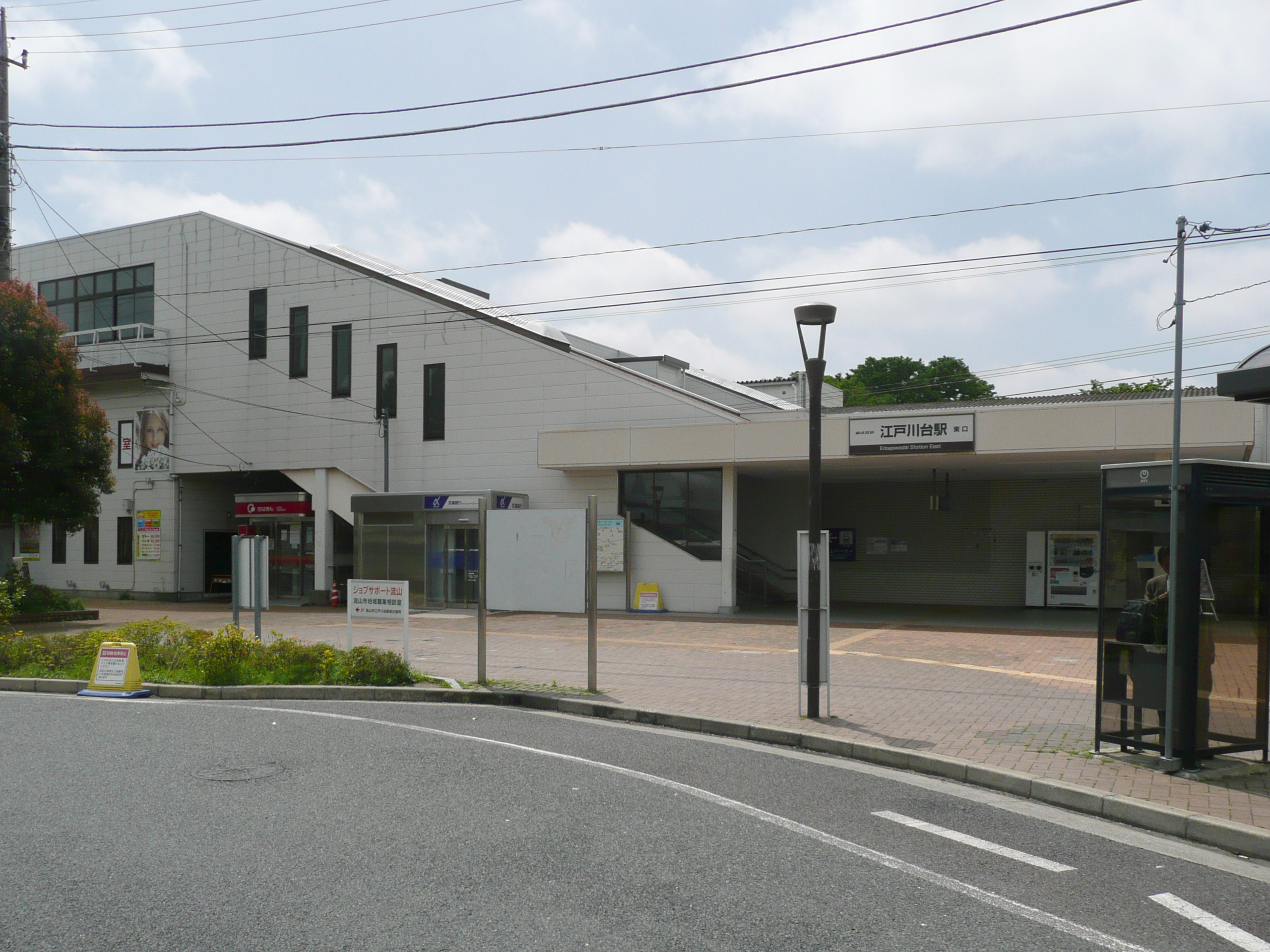
- The east side of Edogawadai Station in April 2012

General information
- Location: 1-3 Edogawadai-Higashi, Nagareyama-shi, Chiba-ken 270-0111; Japan
- Coordinates: 35.8971°N 139.9105°E
- Operator: Tobu Railway
- Line: Tobu Urban Park Line
- Distance: 35.1 km from Ōmiya
- Platforms: 2 side platforms
- Tracks: 2

Other information
- Station code: TD-20
- Website: Official website

History
- Opened: 16 February 1958
- Rebuilt: 1985

Passengers
- FY2018: 24,345 daily

Services
Preceding station	Tobu Railway	Following station
Unga TD19 towards Ōmiya	Tōbu Urban Park Line Section Express	Hatsuishi TD21 towards Kashiwa
Unga TD19 towards Ōmiya	Tōbu Urban Park Line Local	Hatsuishi TD21 towards Funabashi
Location
- Location within Chiba Prefecture Location within Japan

Edogawadai Station (江戸川台駅, Edogawadai-eki) is a railway station in the city of Nagareyama, Chiba Prefecture, Japan, operated by the private railway operator Tōbu Railway. The station is numbered "TD-20".

== Lines ==
Edogawadai Station is served by the 62.7 km Tobu Urban Park Line from Ōmiya in Saitama Prefecture to Funabashi in Chiba Prefecture, and lies 35.1 km from the western terminus of the line at Ōmiya.

== Station layout ==
The station consists of two opposed side platforms serving two tracks, with the station structure located above the platforms.

=== Platforms ===
1	■ Tobu Urban Park Line	for Nodashi, Kasukabe, Iwatsuki, and Ōmiya
2	■ Tobu Urban Park Line	for Kashiwa, Funabashi

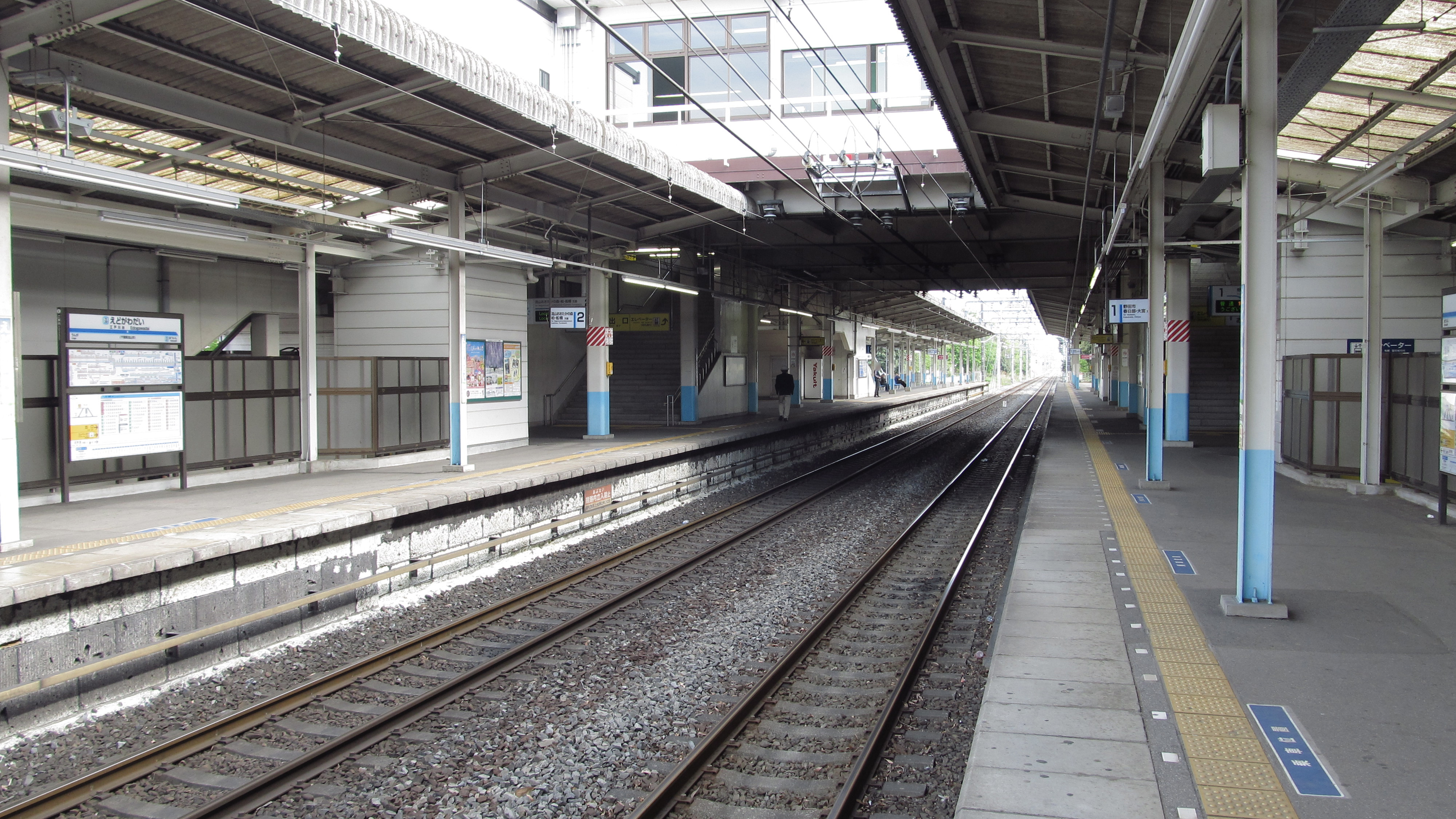
The platforms in April 2013

== History ==
Edogawadai Station was opened on February 16, 1958. The station building was rebuilt in 1985 with a new structure situated above the platforms.

From 17 March 2012, station numbering was introduced on the Tobu Urban Park Line, with Edogawadai Station becoming "TD-20".

== Passenger statistics ==
In fiscal 2018, the station was used by an average of 24,345 passengers daily.

== Surrounding area ==
- University of Tokyo Kashiwa Campus

== See also ==
- List of railway stations in Japan
