= Unga Station =

Railway station in Nagareyama, Chiba Prefecture, Japan

TD19 Unga Station 運河駅
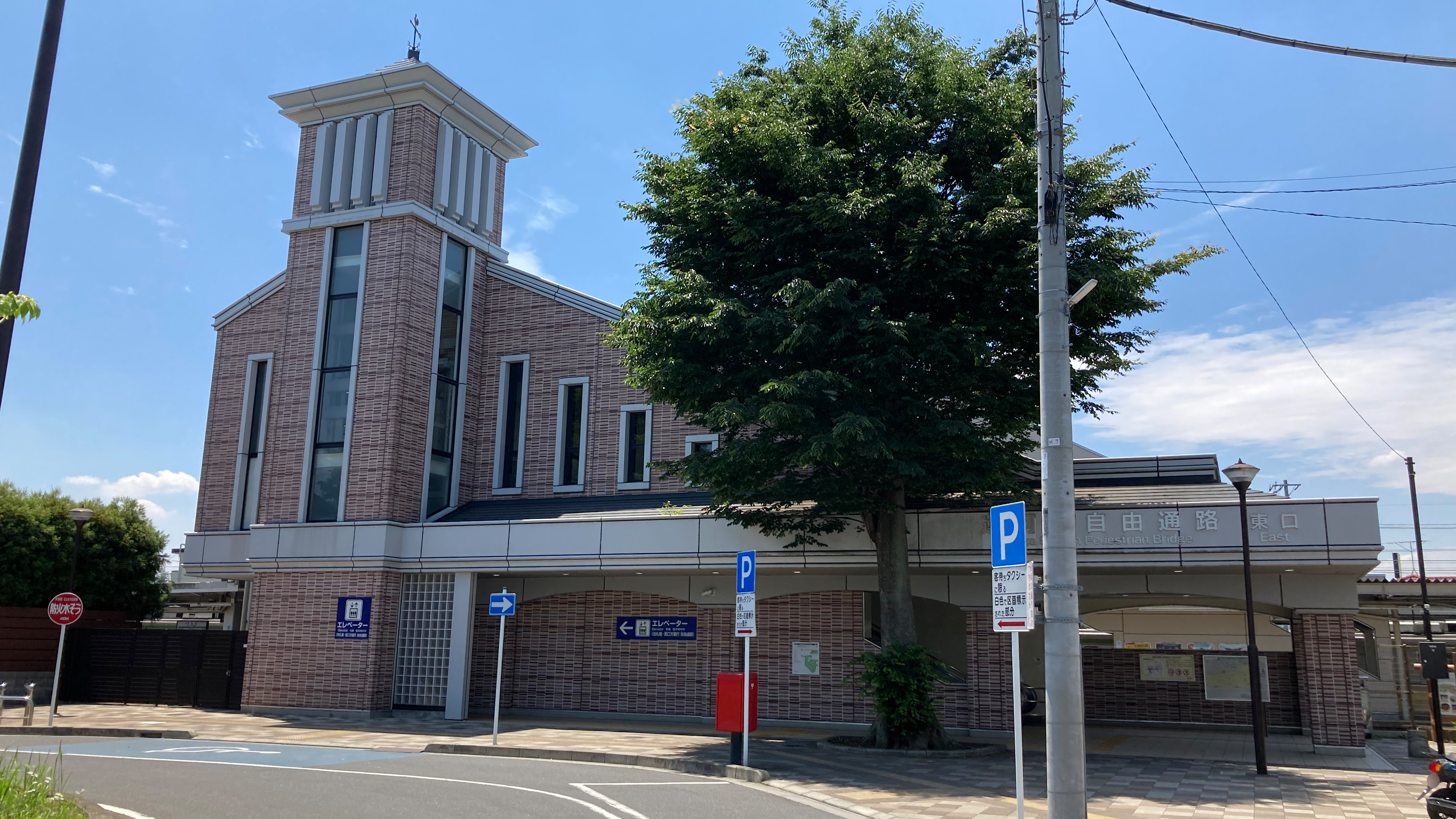
- Unga Station east entrance in May 2021

General information
- Location: 405 Akatsuchi, Higashi-Fukai, Nagareyama-shi, Chiba-ken; Japan
- Coordinates: 35.9145°N 139.9065°E
- Operator: Tobu Railway
- Line: Tobu Urban Park Line
- Platforms: 1 island, 1 side platform

Other information
- Station code: TD-19

History
- Opened: 9 May 1911; 115 years ago

Passengers
- FY2014: 21,232 daily

Services
Preceding station	Tobu Railway	Following station
Nodashi TD18 towards Ōmiya	Urban Park Liner	Nagareyama-ōtakanomori TD22 towards Kashiwa
Nodashi One-way operation	Urban Park Liner from Asakusa	Nagareyama-ōtakanomori TD22 towards Kashiwa
Nodashi TD18 towards Ōmiya	Tōbu Urban Park Line Express	Nagareyama-ōtakanomori TD22 towards Funabashi
Nodashi TD18 towards Ōmiya	Tōbu Urban Park Line Section Express	Edogawadai TD20 towards Kashiwa
Nodashi TD18 towards Ōmiya	Tōbu Urban Park Line Local	Edogawadai TD20 towards Funabashi
Location
- Location within Chiba Prefecture Location within Japan

Unga Station (運河駅, Unga-eki) is a railway station on the Tobu Urban Park Line in Nagareyama, Chiba Japan, operated by the private railway operator Tobu Railway.

== Lines ==
Unga Station is served by the 62.7 km (39.0 mi) Tobu Urban Park Line from Ōmiya in Saitama Prefecture to Funabashi in Chiba Prefecture. It is 33.2 kilometers from the western terminus of the line at Ōmiya.

== Station layout ==
Unga Station has one island platform and one side platform serving three tracks. The station building was rebuilt as a new overhead station, completed during fiscal 2013.

=== Platforms ===
1	■ Tobu Urban Park Line	for Nodashi, Kasukabe, Iwatsuki, and Ōmiya
2/3	■ Tobu Urban Park Line	for Kashiwa and Funabashi

== History ==
Unga Station opened on 9 May 1911. From 17 March 2012, station numbering was introduced on the Tobu Noda Line, with Unga Station becoming "TD-19".

== Passenger statistics ==
In fiscal 2014, the station was used by an average of 21,132 passengers daily.

== Surrounding area ==
- Tokyo University of Science
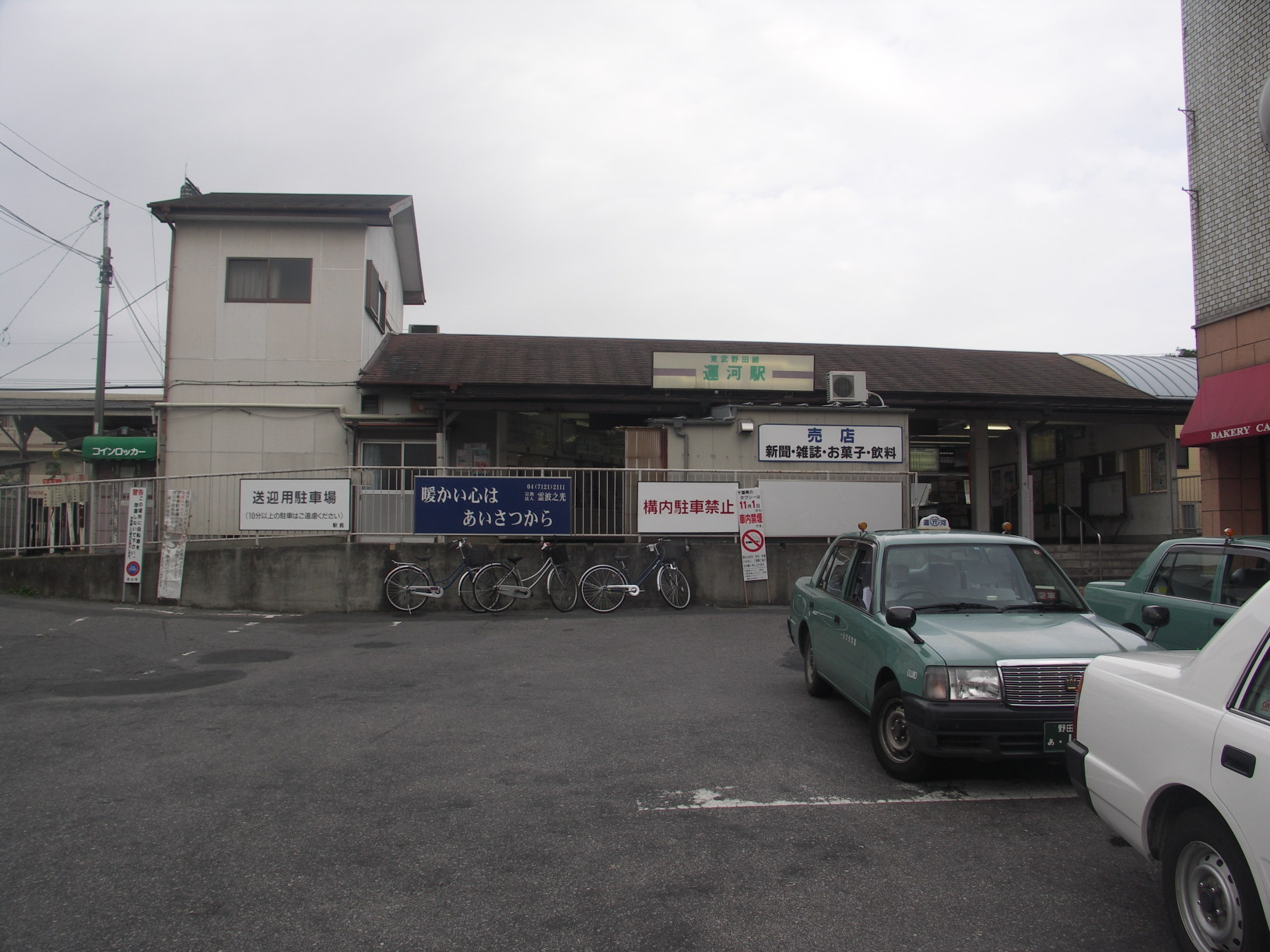
The station building before rebuilding, in September 2007

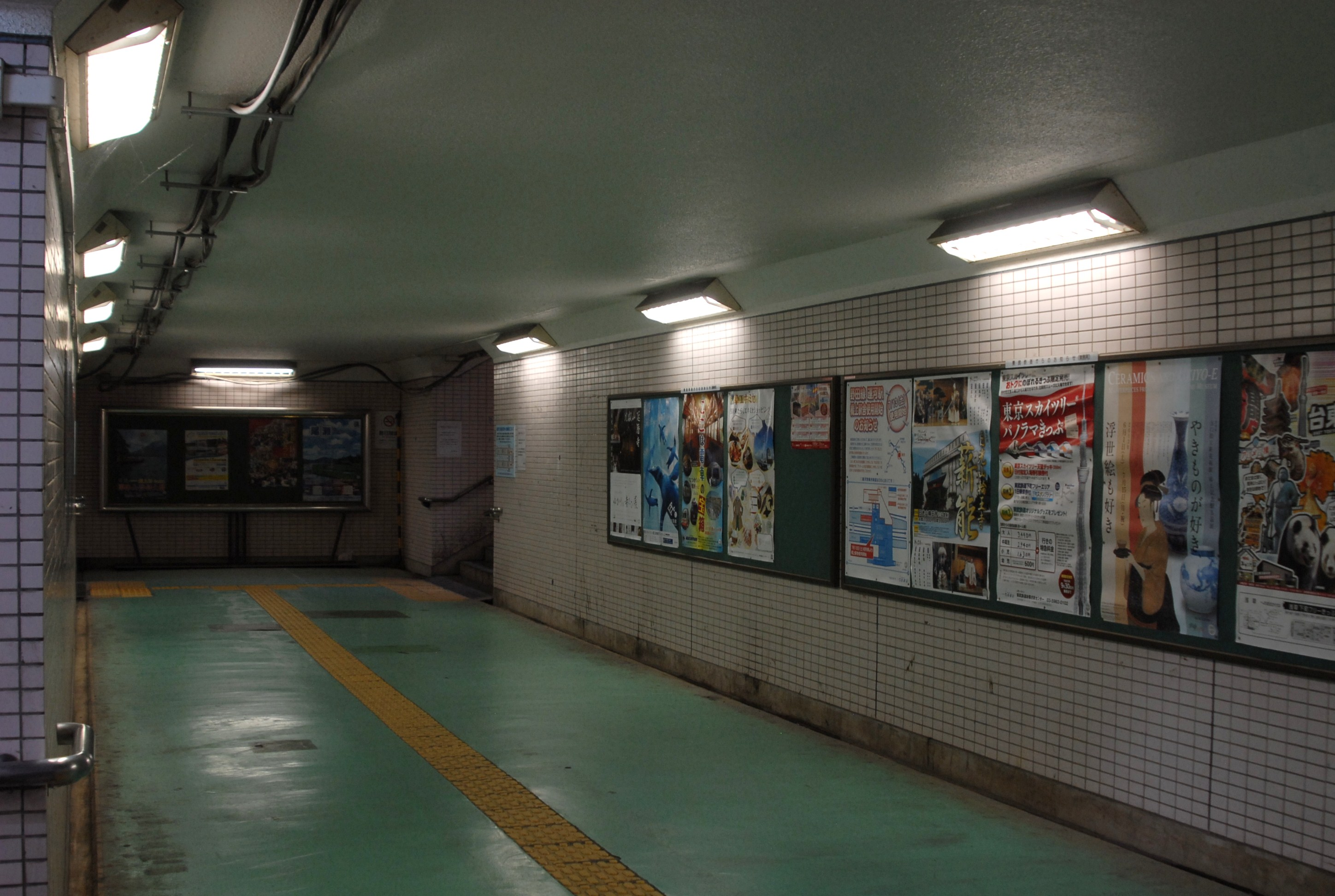
The former station underpass in July 2013

== See also ==
- List of railway stations in Japan
