= Kikkoman =

Japanese food manufacturer

Kikkoman Corporation

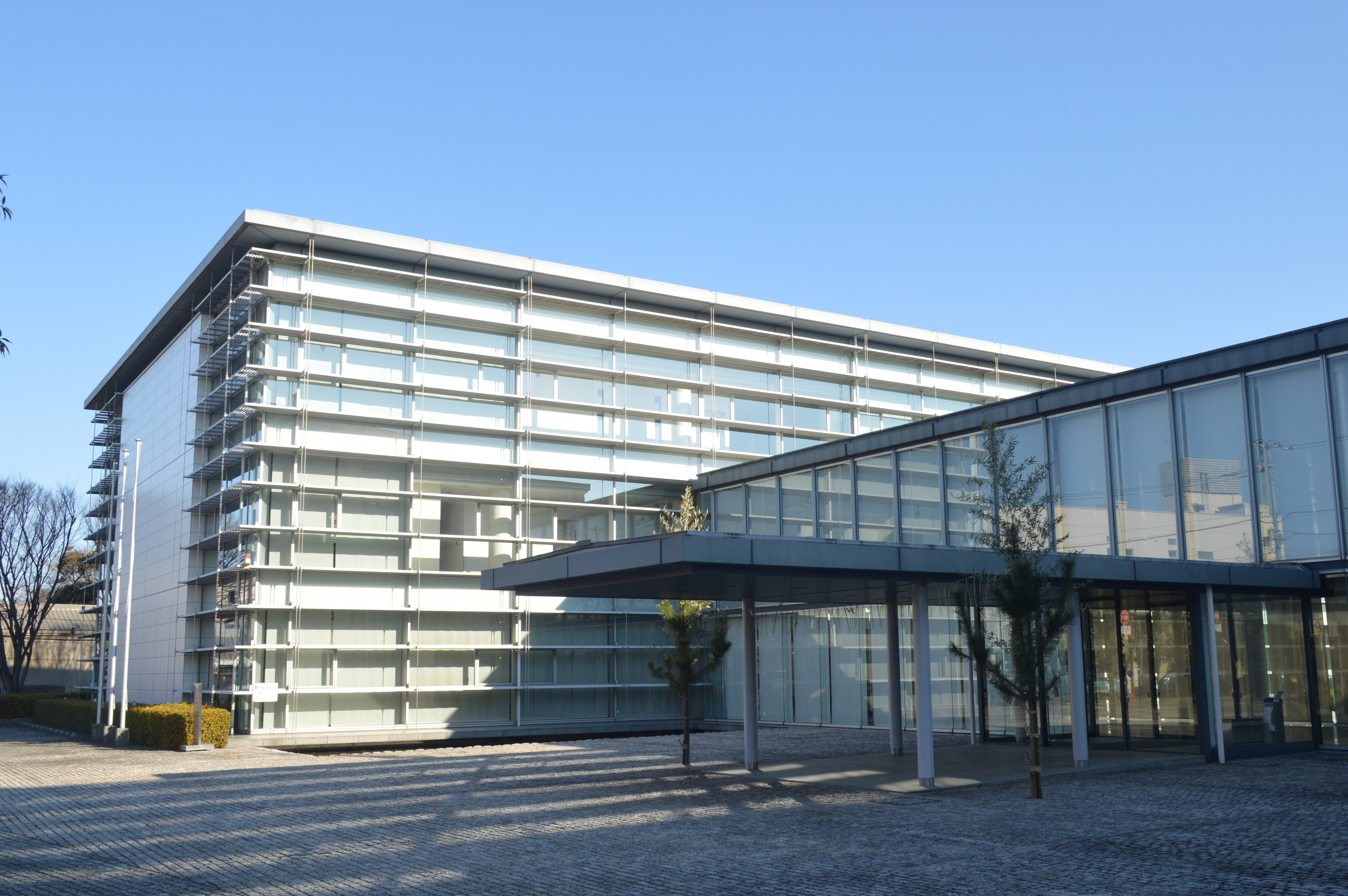
- Headquarters in Noda, Chiba Prefecture, Japan
- Native name: キッコーマン株式会社
- Romanized name: Kikkōman Kabushiki-gaisha
- Type: Public (K.K)
- Traded as: TYO: 2801
- Industry: Food
- Founded: 1661; 365 years ago (oldest establishment); December 7, 1917; 108 years ago (incorporated)
- Headquarters: Noda, Japan
- Key people: Yuzaburo Mogi (Chairman); Shozaburo Nakano (President and CEO)
- Products: Food products, beverages, biochemical products, management services
- Revenue: ▲JPY¥708,98 billion (2025)
- Net income: ▲JPY¥77,28 billion (2025)
- Owner: The Master Trust Bank of Japan (10.04%); Japan Trustee Services Bank (5.50%); Oriental Land Company (0.08%)
- Number of employees: 7,916
- Website: kikkoman.com

Kikkoman Corporation (キッコーマン株式会社, Kikkōman Kabushiki-gaisha) is a Japanese food manufacturer. Its main products and services include soy sauce, food seasoning and flavoring, mirin, shōchū, and sake, juice and other beverages, pharmaceuticals, and restaurant management services. As of 2002, the company was the world's largest producer of soy sauce. As of 2024, the company's motto is "To promote the international exchange of food culture."

As of 2002, Kikkoman has production facilities in Japan, the United States, the Netherlands, Singapore, and Taiwan; additional facilities have been reported in China and Canada. Kikkoman is the most popular brand of soy sauce in Japan and the United States. The city of Düsseldorf, Germany, is the European headquarters of the company. A plant in Sappemeer, Netherlands, began operations in 1997 and now produces over 400 million litres of soy sauce per year.

== History ==
The company was created in 1917 in Noda through the merger of eight family-owned companies, which themselves went back as far as 1603 in the hands of the Mogi and Takanashi families. The company was known as the "Noda Shoyu Corporation" until 1940, when it adopted "Kikkoman" as brand name.

In 1868, when Japan opened up to the world, Kikkoman started exporting its soy sauce to Europe.

It was honored at Expo Vienna in 1873 and Expo Amsterdam in 1883.

In 1908, the company had received a special authorization from the Imperial Household Ministry (now the Imperial Household Agency) to produce shoyu under the traditional method for them. In 1931, Kikkoman built Goyogura in Noda to preserve traditional techniques and continue production of high-end soy sauce for the Imperial Household.

A newspaper advertisement in the San Francisco Chronicle in 1956 included the phrase “Kikkoman, All-Purpose Seasoning”. The phrase has continued to be used on all Kikkoman Soy Sauce labels.

Kikkoman International Inc. was established in 1957, in San Francisco.

In 1962, Katsunuma Yoshu Co., Ltd.（now Manns Wine Co., Ltd.）starts operations in Japan.

In 1969, Kikkoman began operating the American-based Japan Food Corporation, which became JFC International. Its focus is the wholesale of Oriental food products, with a particular emphasis on Japanese ingredients.

Kikkoman Foods, Inc., the first U.S. plant, opened in 1972 in Walworth, Wisconsin. In 1998, Kikkoman opened a second production plant in the U.S., in California.

Kikkoman enters the restaurant business by opening Daitokai restaurant in Düsseldorf, Germany (1973) and Colza restaurant in Tokyo, Japan (1974). As of 2002, the firm owned and operated other food service businesses, including the Nakanakaya pub chain and a Tokyo city wine garden.

Plants opened throuout Asia, starting with Singapore (1983), Taiwan (through merger with Taiwan's largest food company, Uni-President Enterprises Corporation) (1990), Kunshan, Jiangsu Province (near Shanghai) (2000), Shijiazhuang, Hebei Province (near Beijing and Tianjin) (as a joint venture with Shijiazhuang Zhenji Brewing Group Co., Ltd., Northern China's largest soy sauce and vinegar manufacturer) (2008).

In 1990, Kikkoman acquired perpetual marketing rights to "Del Monte" brand for the Asia-Pacific region (excluding the Philippines)

In 1997, Kikkoman's European production operation starts at Hoogezand Sappemeer in the Netherlands. The location for production facility in the northern Dutch city was chosen for its high-quality water, logistically ideal location, and the availability of land. It uses state-of-the-art technology to produce Kikkoman's high quality traditional products.

In 2009, the company is established as a holding structure company, dividing its operations into Kikkoman Food Products Company, Kikkoman Beverage Company and Kikkoman Business Service Company.

In 2014, the Kikkoman General Hospital celebrates its 100th anniversary. It is the only hospital in Japan run by a food manufacturing company.

In 2014, Kikkoman Shanghai Trading Co., Ltd. was established as a sales office in Shanghai.

In 2019, Kikkoman R&D Center is completed.

Kikkoman began outsourced production and sales of Kikkoman Brand soy sauce related products in Brazil from 2018. In March 2020, “Kikkoman Brasil” started operations. The production plant begins shipping soy sauce in 2023.

== Soy sauce production ==
Kikkoman has three production plants in Japan and eight overseas.

In the 17th century, soy sauce was produced entirely by hand using a traditional method of natural brewing called "honjozo". In modern times, "honjozo" continues to be used, but adopting newer technologies.

Basic ingredients for soy sauce are soybeans, wheat, salt and water.

The process begins with soaking soybeans in water and then steaming them at high temperatures. Wheat is roasted at high temperatures, and then crushed by rollers to facilitate fermentation. These soybeans are then mixed with crushed roasted wheat. Carbohydrates contained in wheat give soy sauce its aroma, also adding sweetness to it. A type of the Aspergillus fungus is then introduced to the mixture. Since its founding, Kikkoman has used its own Aspergillus, a kind of koji mold, which plays a very important role in fermenting the raw materials and then producing the characteristic “color”, “taste” and “aroma” of Kikkoman soy sauce. The base is then moved to a special location equipped with an optimum environment for the growth of Kikkoman Aspergillus and left for three days. It is through this three-day process that shōyu koji is made.

Salt is dissolved in water to make brine, The shōyu koji is mixed with the brine, which controls the growth of bacteria during the fermentation process, prevents spoilage, and also imparts the salty taste to soy sauce. This mixture, called moromi, is fermented and aged in large tanks or vats for several months. Inside of these tanks, and due to the action of the microorganisms, the moromi undergoes several types of fermentation, including lactic acid and alcohol fermentation, which create the rich flavor, aroma and color unique to soy sauce.

The traditional method, widely used during the Edo period, and with very limited use in our days, requires cedar vats / barrels (kioke) for fermentation. This was what Kikkoman used to work with before adopting the stainless steel vats after WW2. It still uses them for their premium series, and has received support from Yasuo Yamamoto of the Yamaroku soy sauce family company, as one of the few remaining providers of these types of containers, to take care of their cedar vats.

Procedure also includes a fermentation method called "maruyaka" (mellow), using the whole, unprocessed soybeans (marudaizu).

After the fermentation period is completed, the moromi is taken to the press. Then, it is mechanically pressed through multiple layers of fabric for about ten hours to extract the shōyu, which is allowed to flow under the force of gravity. The raw shōyu is left to settle for 3–4 days in a clarifier tank to separate into its various components, with oil floating to the surface and sediment settling on the bottom. Only the clarified portion in the middle is extracted. Next, the raw shōyu is then pasteurized using steam. By this process enzymatic activity is halted. What is left of the pressed moromi is a by–product. It is recycled and used as livestock feed. The final product is then given a final inspection and then bottled.

Inspections are carried out for all processes to confirm that quality is maintained in accordance with standards. An inspector analyzes the ingredients to check the soy sauce for flavor, taste and color.

Kikkoman's soy sauce bottle was designed by Kenji Ekuan in 1961.

== Products ==
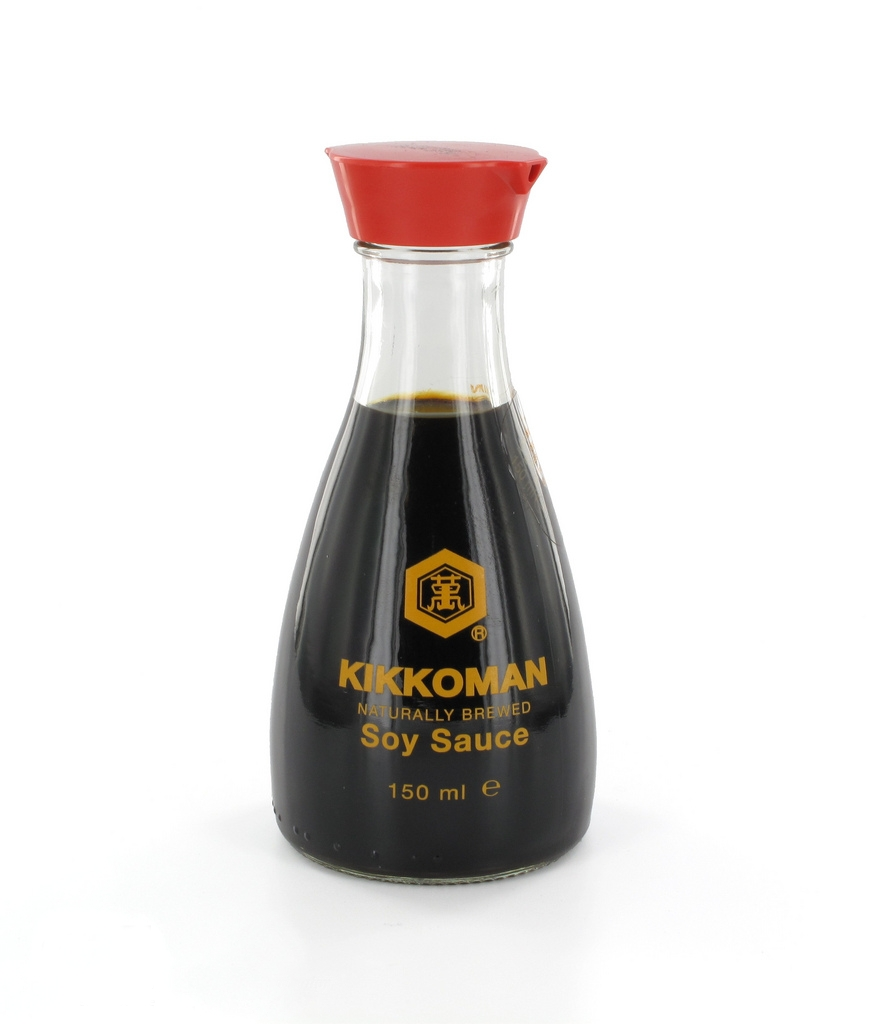
Kikkoman soy sauce

Kikkoman is the largest shoyu manufacturing company in the world, with production plants in Wisconsin, U.S.A., Singapore, Taiwan, the Netherlands and China. Around 57 percent of the company's revenues comes from overseas sales Besides the traditional bottle of soy sauce, Kikkoman has "less salt", "gluten free", "ponzu", "sweet", "marudaizu" options. A premium version made using the techniques used in the Edo period is also available. It is made in the Goyogura brewery.

The company offers a range of soy milk products. Kikkoman Soy milk, produced using selected soybeans, is a leading brand in Japan and began expanding internationally in 2018, reaching the Asia and Oceania regions.

Kikkoman started producing tomato products in 1962. The plant in Gunma focuses on tomato seasonings, while the Nagano plant specializes in beverages. In August 2013, Kikkoman launched the "Lycopene Rich" tomato ketchup, made with ripe tomatoes. This product line includes tomato sauce, puree, pizza sauce, and tomato beverages. Under the name The Nippon Del Monte Agri Company, established in 2013, the company focused on the production and sales of fresh tomatoes and vegetable seedlings. The company increased harvest yields by incorporating advanced technology from the Netherlands and optimizing farming methods for Japan.

== See also ==
- Kikkoman Soy Sauce Museum
- Kuishinbo! Bansai
