= Yuzaburo Mogi =

Japanese businessman (born 1935)

Yūzaburō Mogi
- 茂木 友三郎
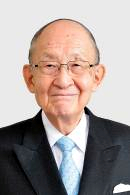
- Yūzaburō Mogi
- Born: February 13, 1935 (age 91); Noda, Chiba, Empire of Japan
- Education: Keio University (B.A.); Columbia University (M.B.A)
- Occupations: Honorary CEO and Chairman of Kikkoman
- Known for: Chairman of Kikkoman

Yūzaburō Mogi (茂木 友三郎, Mogi Yūzaburō; born February 13, 1935) is a Japanese businessman who is the current Chairman and honorary CEO of Kikkoman.

== Early life and career ==
Mogi obtained a Bachelor of Arts from Keio University in 1958 and a Master of Business Administration from Columbia Business School in 1961. In the 1950s, Mogi helped introduce soy sauce to the American public by hiring chefs to create recipes that included it. He then sent the recipes to local newspapers, in an attempt to get housewives to cut them out and shop for the ingredient. Mogi was appointed President and CEO of Kikkoman in 1995. He previously served as President of Kikkoman.
