= Kikkoman Soy Sauce Museum =

Museum in Noda, Japan

The Kikkoman Soy Sauce Museum (キッコーマンもの知りしょうゆ館, Kikkōman Monoshiri Shōyukan) is a museum run by the soy sauce manufacturer Kikkoman inside its factory near Nodashi Station in Noda, Chiba, Japan.

The museum offers soy sauce production process information and the history of soy sauce, as well as factory tours. An offsite stockhouse is also available for viewing. The separate city museum also has soy sauce tools on display.
