= Higashi-Funabashi Station =

Railway station in Funabashi, Chiba Prefecture, Japan

JB32 Higashi-Funabashi Station 東船橋駅
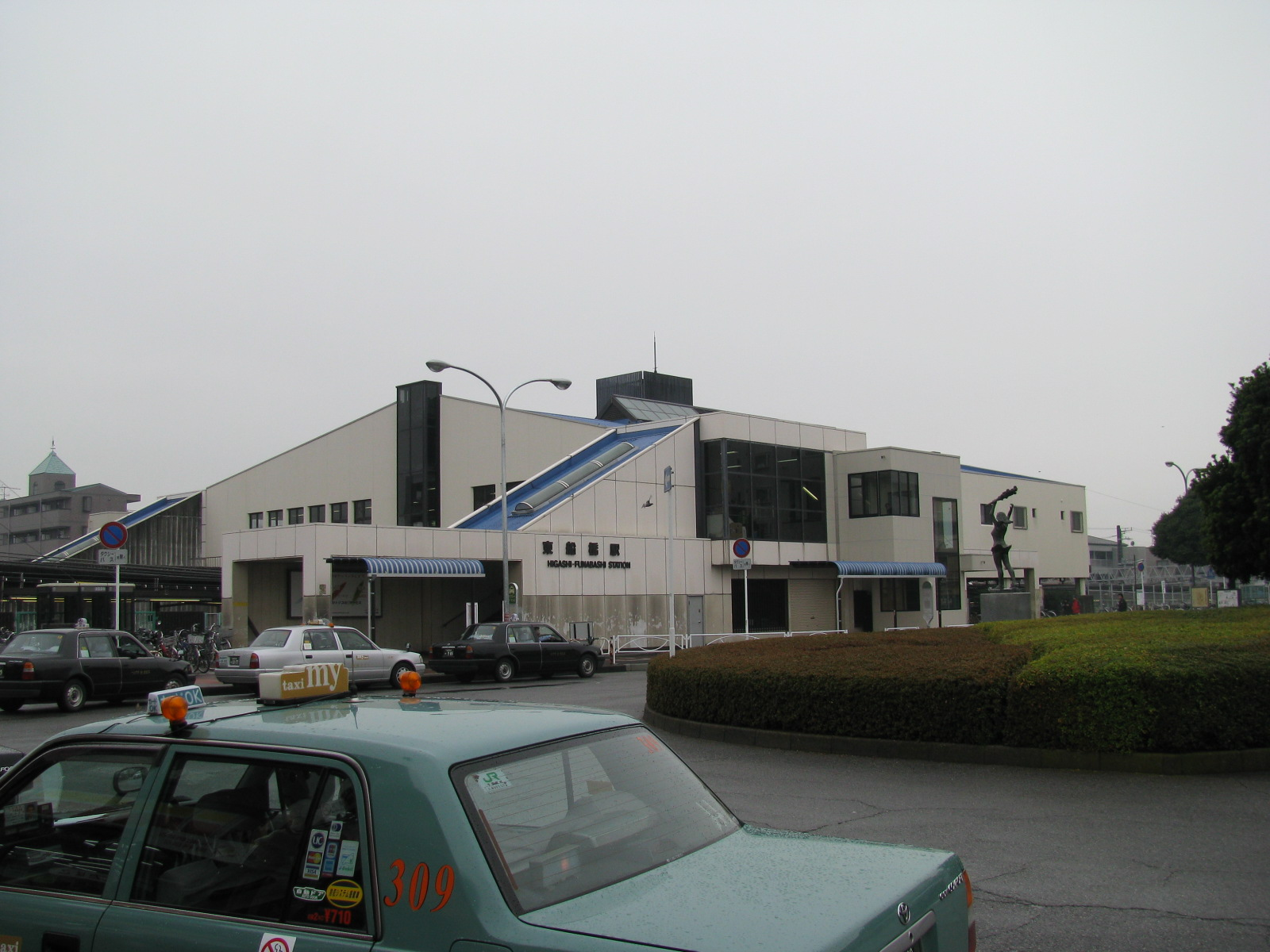
- North side of the station, December 2007

General information
- Location: 2-10 Higashi-Funabashi, Funabashi-shi, Chiba-ken 273-0002; Japan
- Coordinates: 35.7000°N 140.0042°E
- Operator: JR East
- Line: Chūō-Sōbu Line
- Platforms: 1 island platform

Other information
- Station code: JB32
- Website: Official website

History
- Opened: 1 October 1981

Passengers
- FY2019: 20,542

Services
Preceding station	JR East	Following station
Funabashi JB31 towards Mitaka	Chūō–Sōbu Line	Tsudanuma JB33 towards Chiba
Funabashi JB31 towards Mitaka	Chūō–Sōbu Line via Tōzai Line	Tsudanuma JB33 Terminus
Location
- Location within Chiba Prefecture Location within Japan

Higashi-Funabashi Station (東船橋駅, Higashi-Funabashi-eki) is a passenger railway station in the city of Funabashi, Chiba, Japan, operated by East Japan Railway Company (JR East).

== Lines ==
Higashi-Funabashi Station is located on the Sōbu Main Line and is served by Chūō-Sōbu Line local services, and is located 25.0 kilometers from the starting point of the line at Tokyo and 14.2 kilometers from Chiba.

== Station layout ==
The station consists of an elevated island platform serving two tracks, with an elevated station building. The station is staffed.

1	Chūō-Sōbu Line	for Nishi-Funabashi, Akihabara and Shinjuku; Tokyo Metro Tozai Line for Urayasu, Nihombashi and Otemachi
2	Chūō-Sōbu Line	for Tsudanuma and Chiba

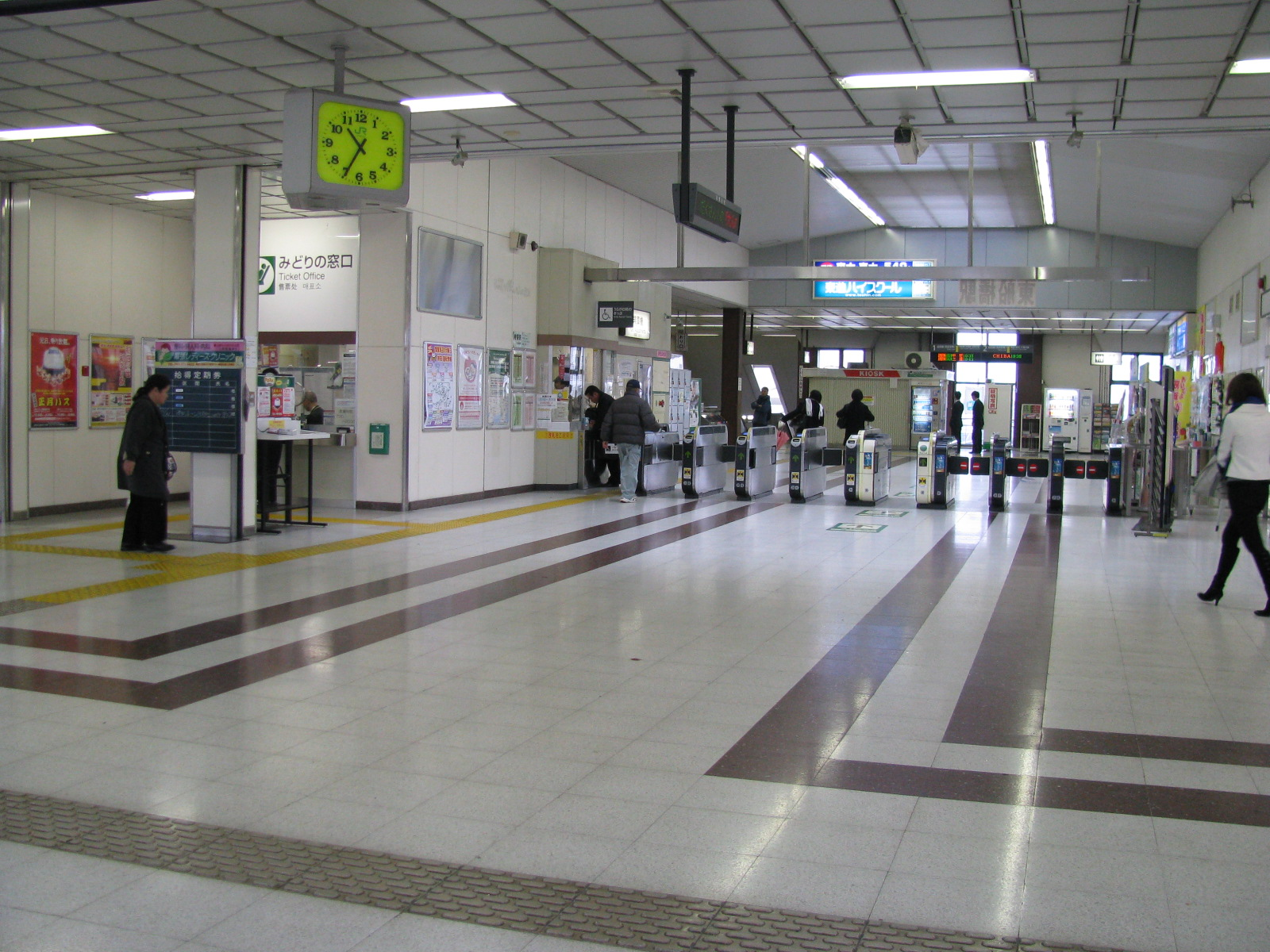
The ticket barriers, December 2007

== History ==
Higashi-Funabashi Station opened on 1 October 1981.

== Passenger statistics ==
In fiscal 2019, the station was used by an average of 20,542 passengers daily (boarding passengers only).

== Surrounding area ==
- National Route 296
- Chiba Prefectural Funabashi High School

== See also ==
- List of railway stations in Japan
