= Nodashi Station =

Railway station in Noda, Chiba Prefecture, Japan

TD17 Nodashi Station 野田市駅
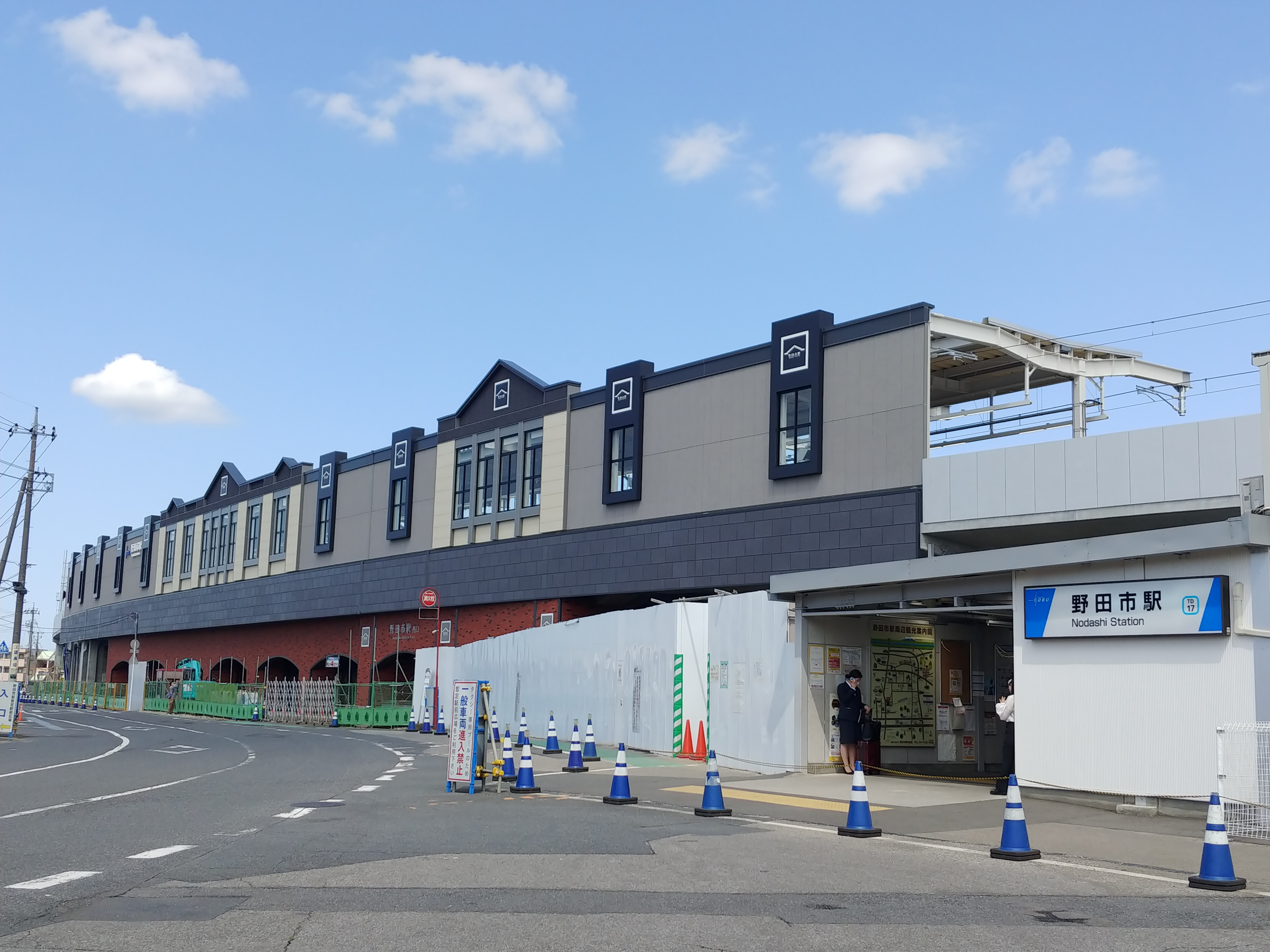
- Nodashi Station in March 2021

General information
- Location: 128 Noda, Noda-shi, Chiba-ken 278-0037; Japan
- Coordinates: 35.9429°N 139.8706°E
- Operator: Tobu Railway
- Line: Tobu Urban Park Line
- Distance: 28.6 km from Ōmiya
- Platforms: 2 island platforms
- Tracks: 4

Other information
- Station code: TD-17
- Website: Official website

History
- Opened: 9 May 1911; 115 years ago
- Former names: Nodamachi (until 1950)

Passengers
- FY2018: 10,099 daily

Services
| Preceding station | Tobu Railway | Following station |
|---|---|---|
| Atago TD16 towards Ōmiya | Urban Park Liner | Umesato TD18 towards Kashiwa |
| Atago One-way operation | Urban Park Liner from Asakusa | Umesato TD18 towards Kashiwa |
| Atago TD16 towards Ōmiya | Tōbu Urban Park Line Express | Umesato TD18 towards Funabashi |
| Atago TD16 towards Ōmiya | Tōbu Urban Park Line Section Express | Umesato TD18 towards Kashiwa |
| Atago TD16 towards Ōmiya | Tōbu Urban Park Line Local | Umesato TD18 towards Funabashi |
Location
- Location within Chiba Prefecture Location within Japan

Nodashi Station (野田市駅, Nodashi-eki) is a railway station in the city of Noda, Chiba, Japan, operated by the private railway operator Tōbu Railway. The station is numbered "TD-17".

== Lines ==
Nodashi Station is served by the 62.7 km (39.0 mi) Tobu Urban Park Line, (also known as the Tōbu Noda Line), and is 28.6 km (17.8 mi) from the line's western terminus at Ōmiya Station.

== Station layout ==
Nodashi Station has two island platforms serving two tracks each, connected to the entrance level by escalators and elevators.

=== Platforms ===
| 1, 2 | ■ Tobu Urban Park Line | for Kasukabe, Iwatsuki, and Ōmiya |
| 3, 4 | ■ Tobu Urban Park Line | for Kashiwa and Funabashi |

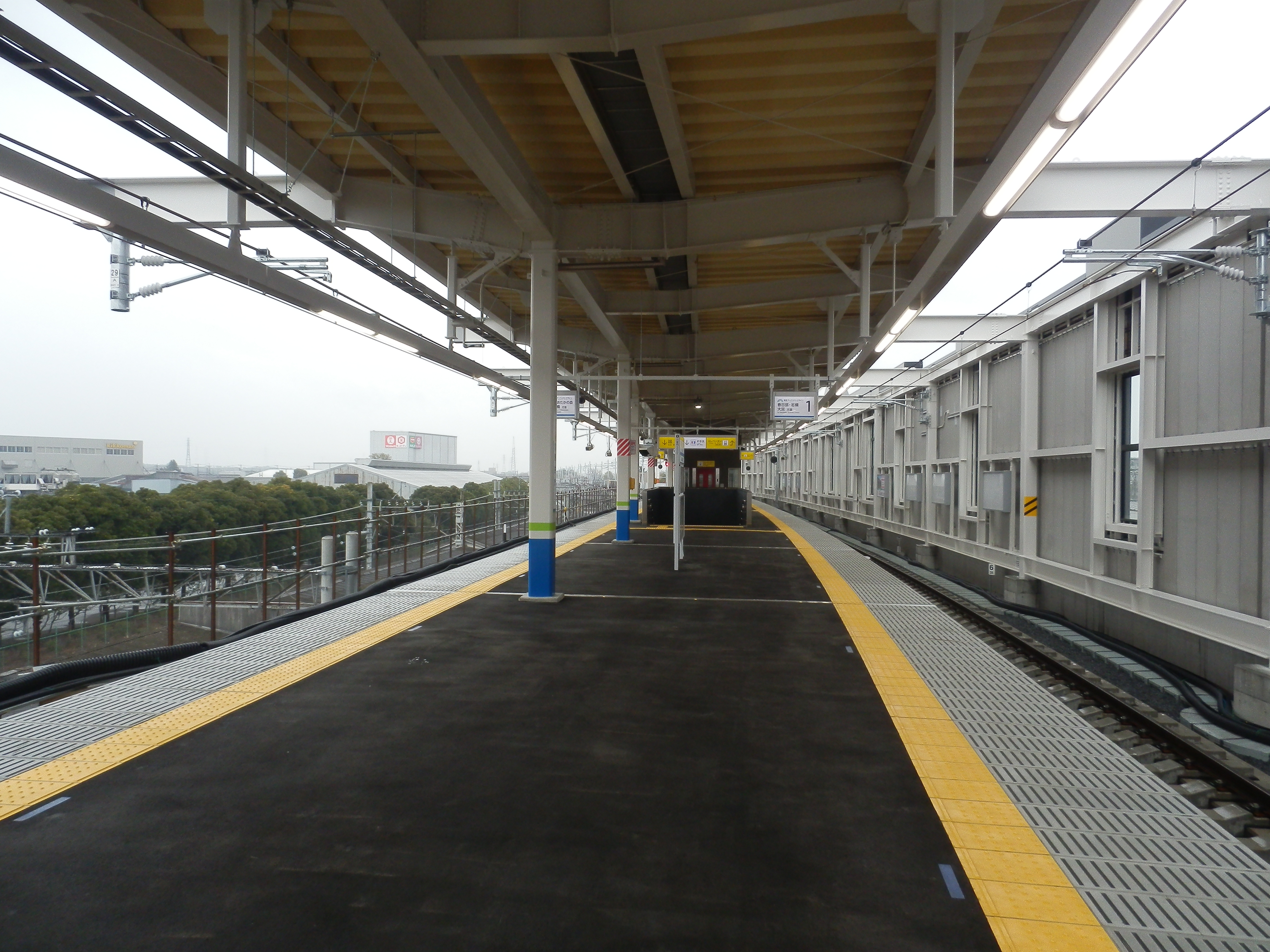
Elevated platforms 1 & 2 after opening in March 2021

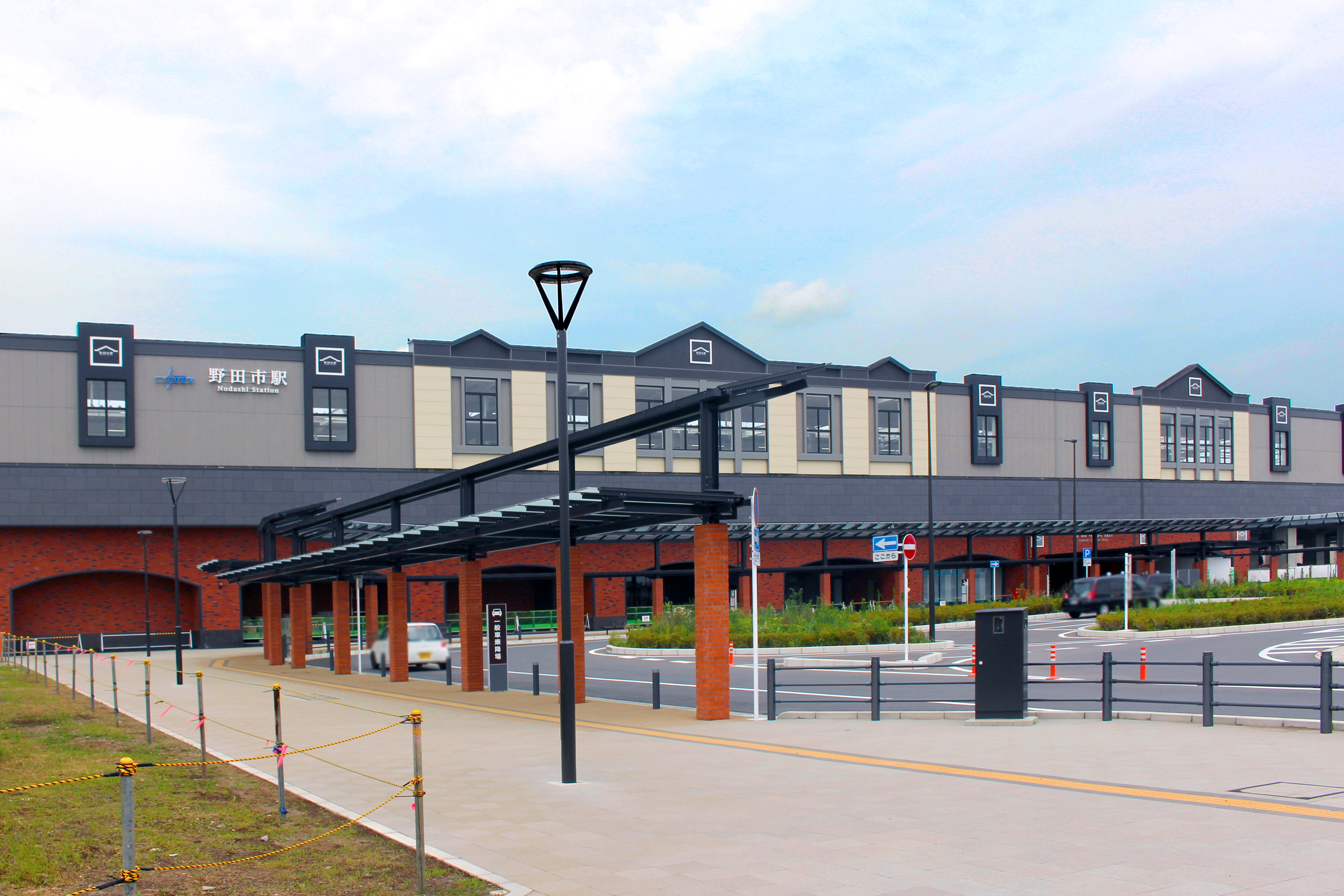
Station entrance in June 2024

Prior to the elevation of the station, it had an island platform (platforms 2 & 3) and a side platform (1) with three tracks. From 28 September 2014, to make room for the elevation works, only the island platform remained in service.

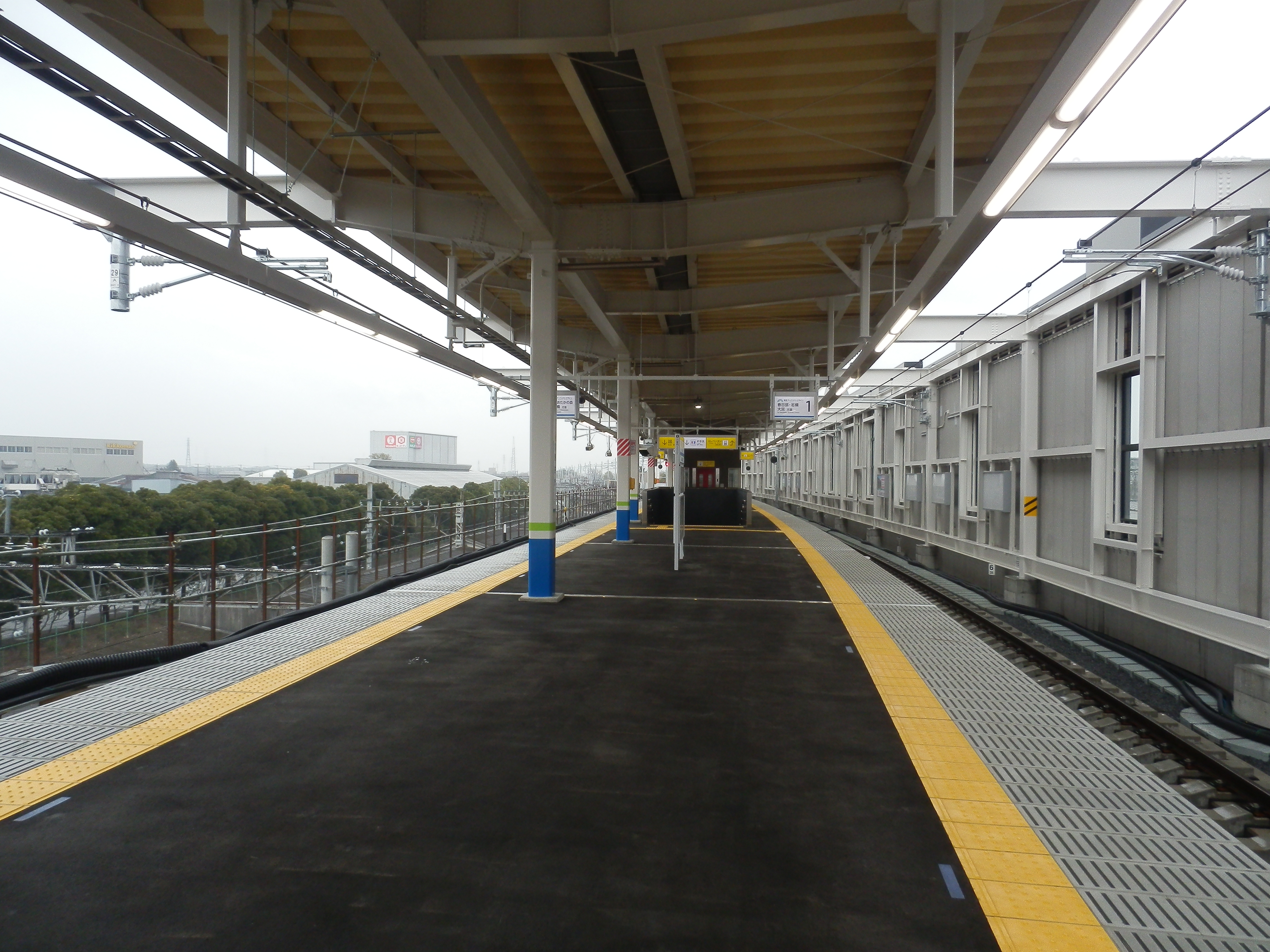
The remaining island platform (platforms 2 & 3) in March 2021

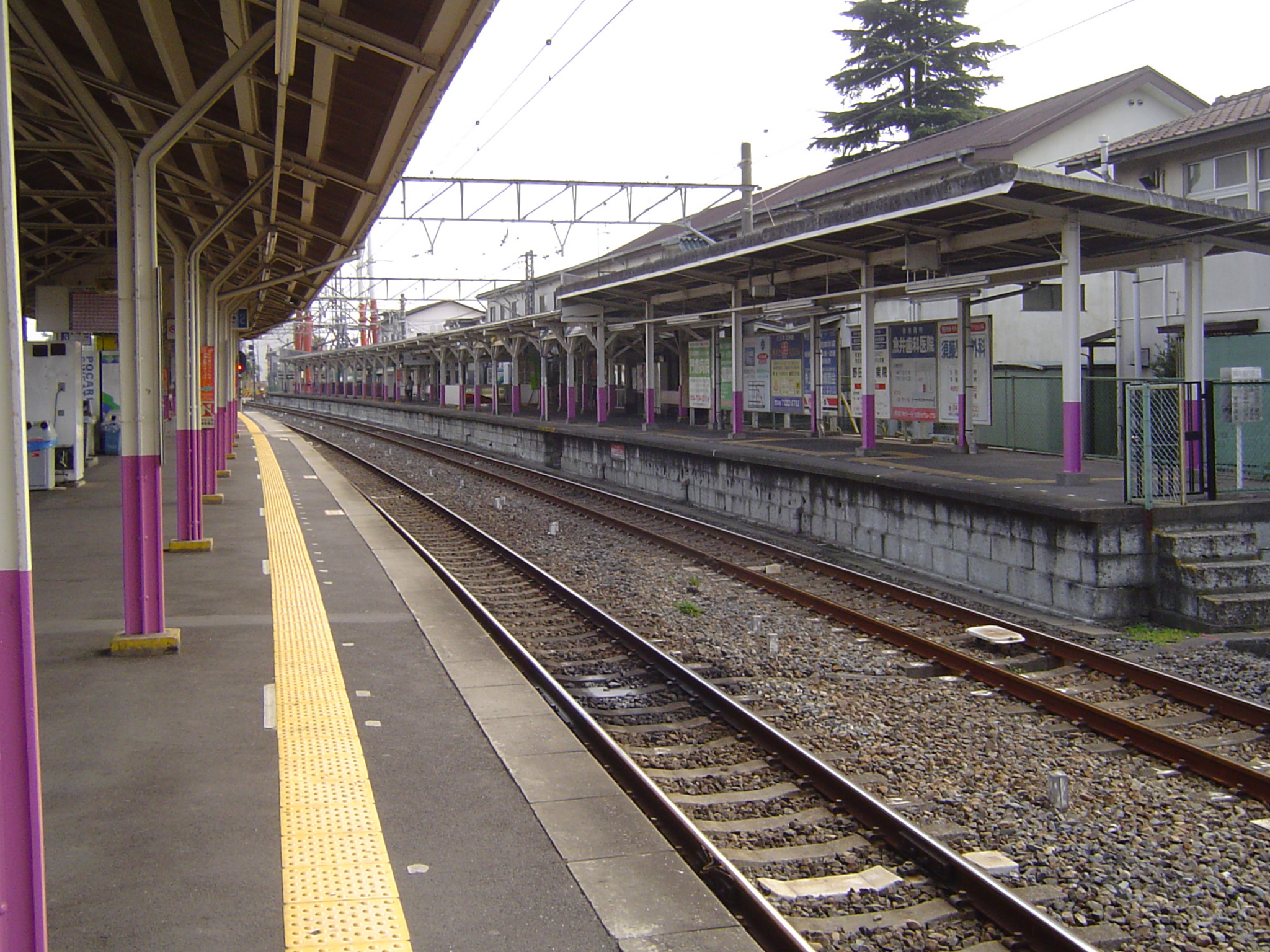
The former westbound platform (platform 1) in October 2006

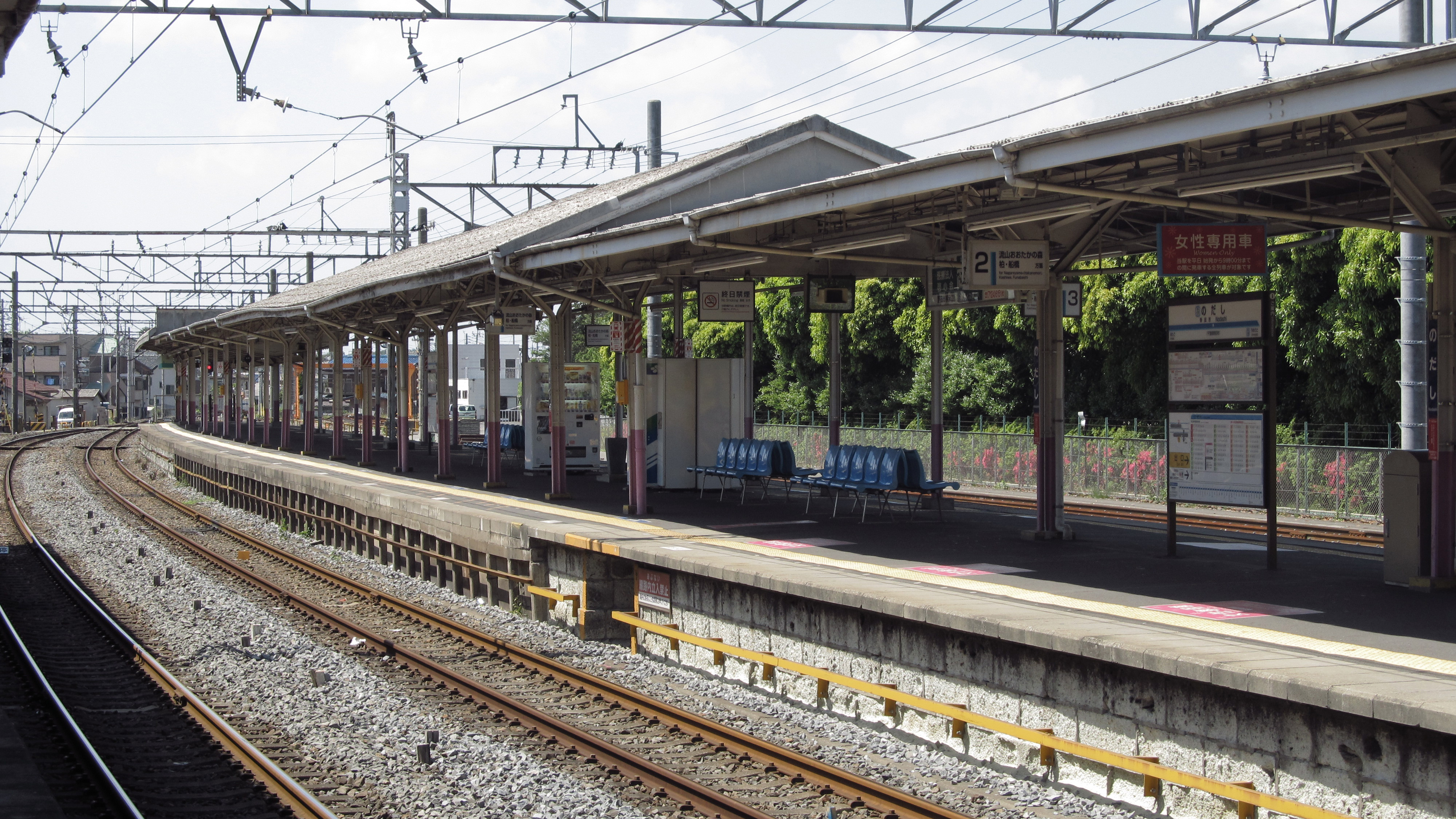
The eastbound platforms (2 and 3) in May 2013

== History ==
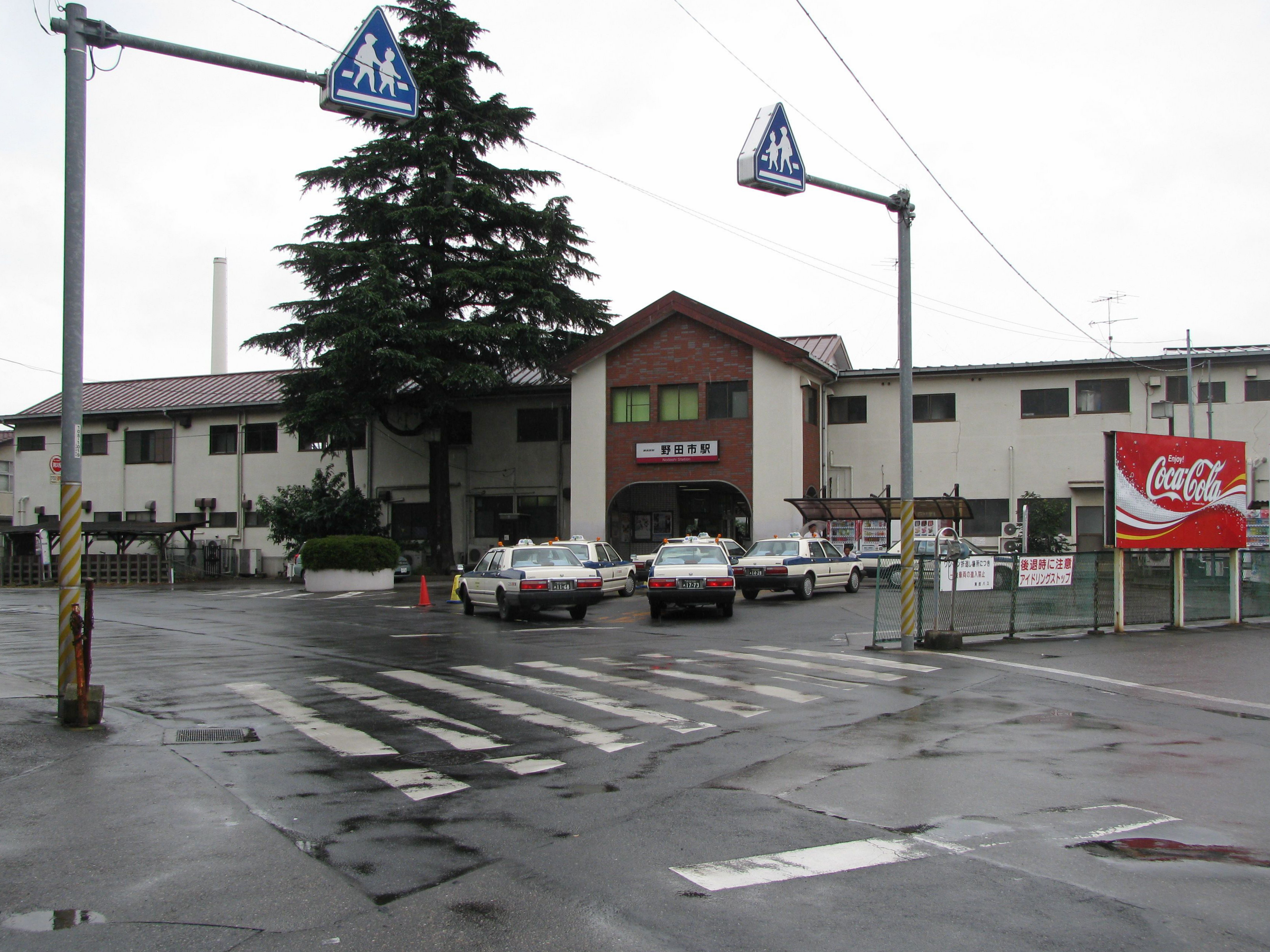
The station in July 2011 before the start of rebuilding work

The station opened on May 9, 1911, as Nodamachi Station (野田市駅). It was renamed Nodashi Station on May 30, 1950.

From 17 March 2012, station numbering was introduced on the Tobu Noda Line, with Nodashi Station becoming "TD-17".

From 1 April 2014, the Tobu Noda Line was rebranded the Tobu Urban Park Line (東武アーバンパークライン). By that time, a project to elevate the station was on-going, with the aim to complete the project in 2017. The elevated station started operation with one island platform and two tracks on 28 March 2021. The second island platform with two more tracks opened on 3 March 2024.

== Passenger statistics ==
In fiscal 2018, the station was used by an average of 10,099 passengers daily. The passenger figures for previous years are as shown below.

| Fiscal year | Daily average |
|---|---|
| 2010 | 9,964 |
| 2011 | 10,081 |
| 2012 | 10,420 |
| 2013 | 10,511 |
| 2014 | 10,361 |
| 2015 | 10,293 |

== Surrounding area ==
- Noda Post Office
- Kikkoman Soy Sauce Museum

== See also ==
- List of railway stations in Japan
