= Funabashi Station =

Railway station in Funabashi, Chiba Prefecture, Japan

Coordinates: 35.701743°N 139.985229°E

Funabashi Station 船橋駅
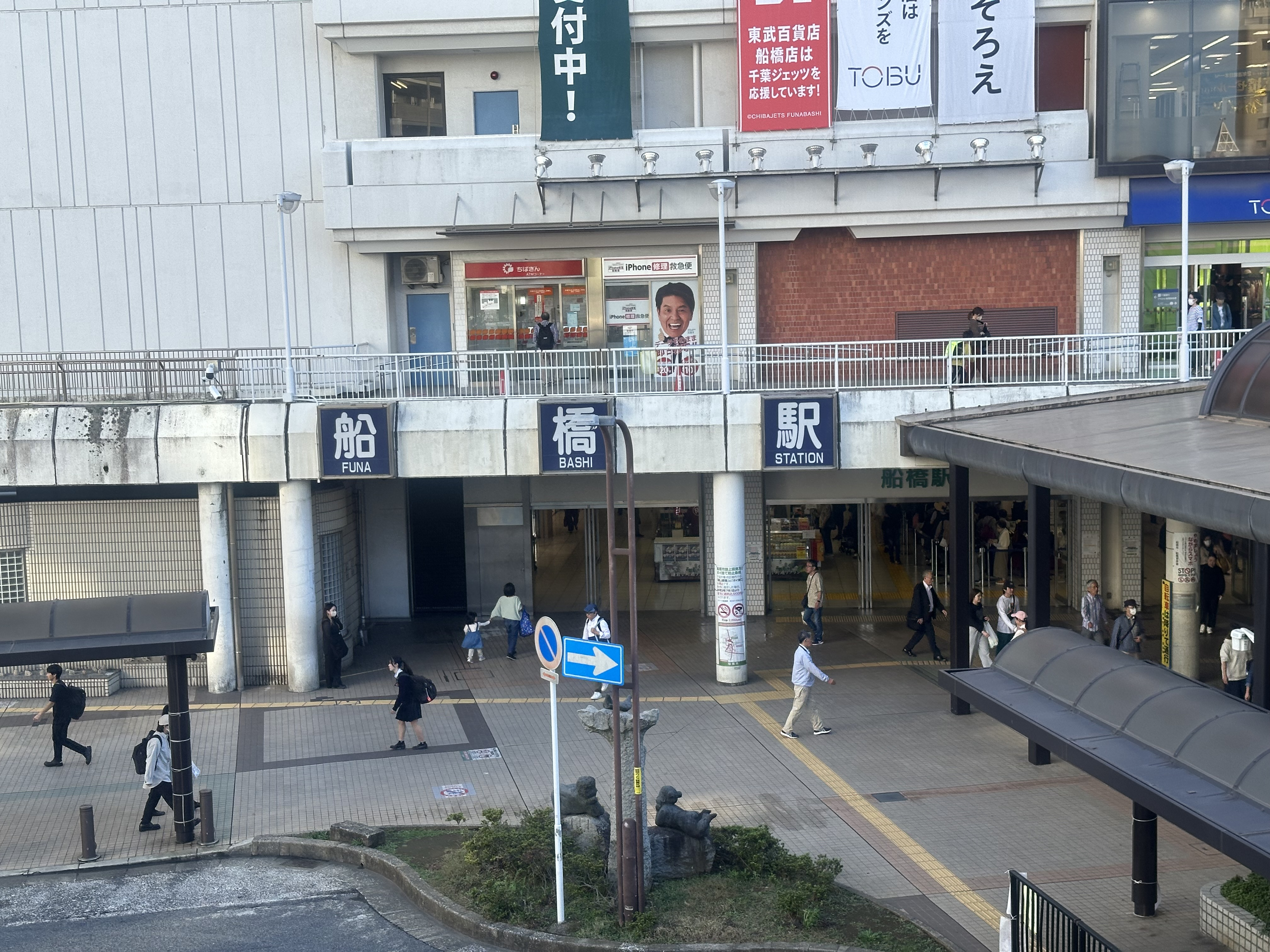
- The JR East station north entrance in 2025

General information
- Location: Funabashi, Chiba; Japan
- Operator: JR East; Tobu Railway
- Lines: Sōbu Main Line; Tobu Urban Park Line
- Connections: KS22 Keisei Funabashi
Location
- Location within Chiba Prefecture Location within Kanto Area Location within Japan

Funabashi Station (船橋駅, Funabashi-eki) is a railway station in Funabashi, Chiba, Japan, operated by East Japan Railway Company (JR East) and the private railway operator Tobu Railway.

== Lines ==
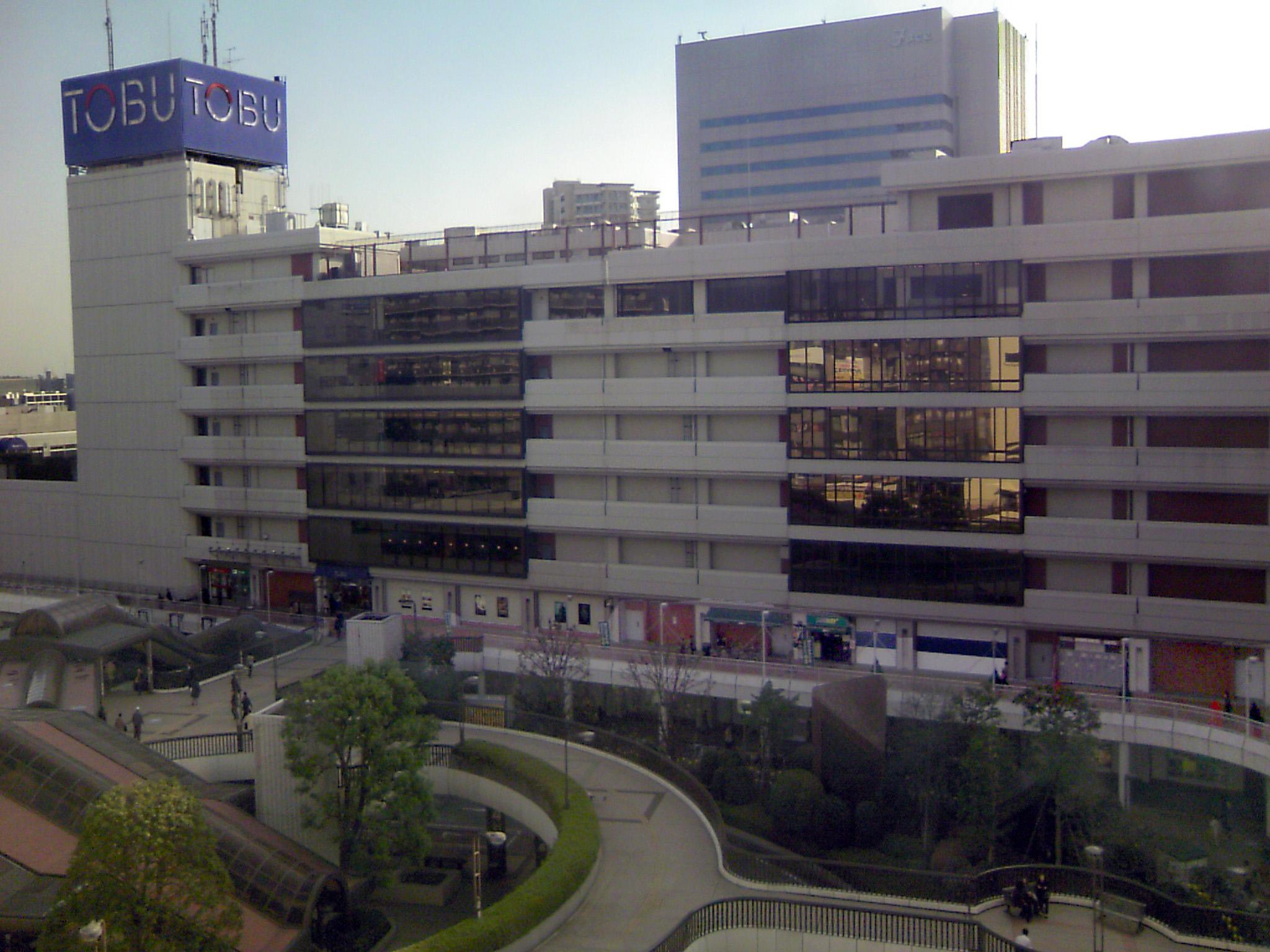
The north side of the station and Tobu Department Store building, December 2009

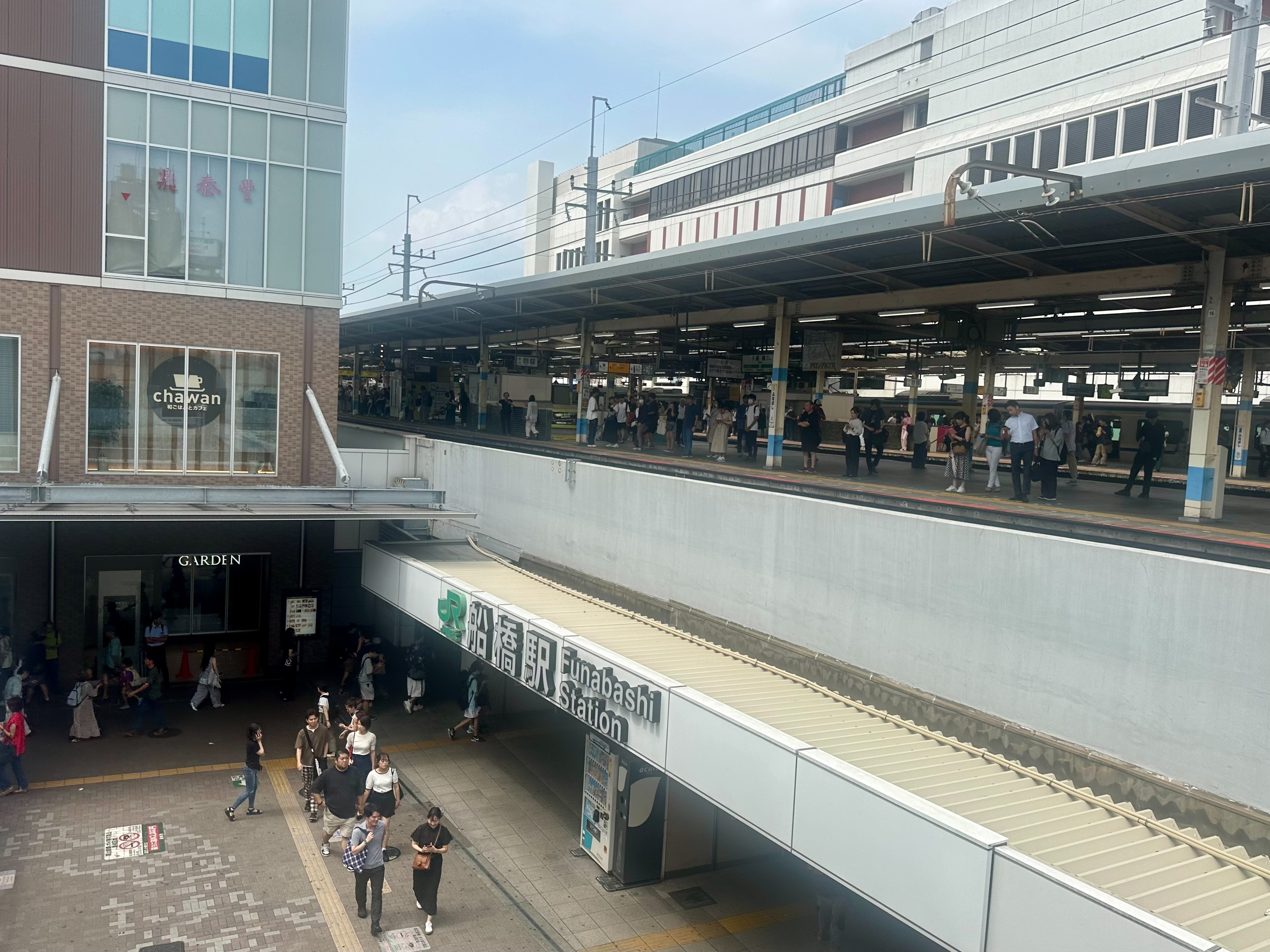
The south side of the station, September 2024

Funabashi Station is served by the JR East Sōbu Main Line and 23.2 kilometres (14.4 mi) from the starting point of that line at Tokyo Station. It also forms the eastern terminus of the 62.7-kilometre (39.0 mi) Tōbu Urban Park Line (Tōbu Noda Line). Passengers can also transfer to nearby Keisei Funabashi Station on the Keisei Main Line.

== JR East ==
JO25 JB31 Funabashi Station 船橋駅
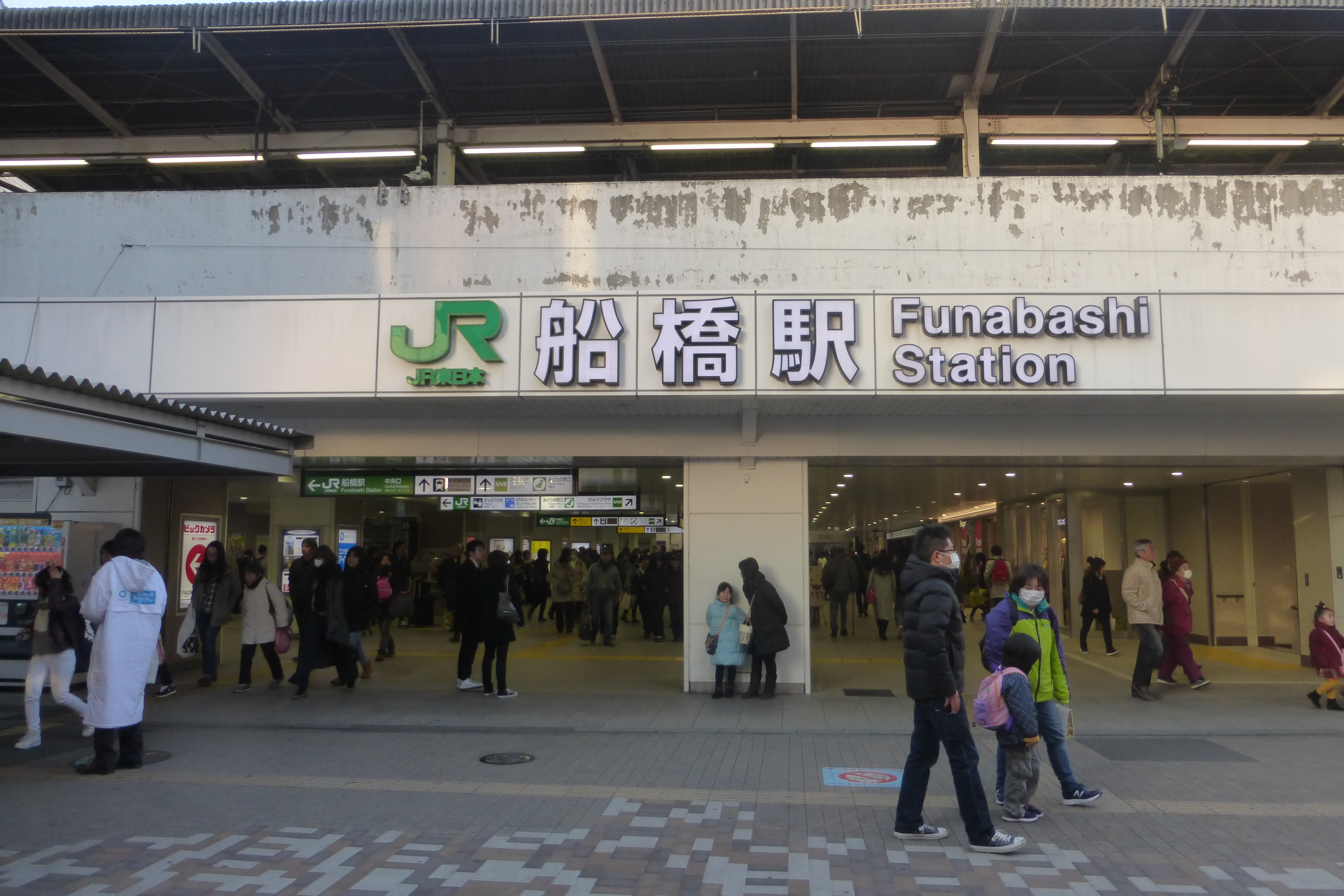
- The JR East station south entrance in 2017

General information
- Location: 7 Honcho, Funabashi City, Chiba Prefecture; Japan
- Operator: JR East
- Lines: Chūō-Sōbu Line; Sōbu Line (Rapid)
- Platforms: 2 island platforms
- Tracks: 4

Construction
- Structure type: Elevated

Other information
- Station code: JB31 (Chūō-Sōbu Line); JO25 (Sōbu Line (Rapid))
- Website: www.jreast.co.jp/estation/station/info.aspx?StationCd=1382

History
- Opened: 20 July 1894; 132 years ago

Passengers
- FY2014: 135,322

Services
| Preceding station | JR East | Following station |
|---|---|---|
| Kinshichō JO22 towards Hakuba | Azusa | Chiba JO28 Terminus |
| Kinshichō JO22 towards Ōtsuki | Fuji Excursion | Chiba One-way operation |
| Kinshichō JO22 towards Tokyo | Shiosai (limited service) | Chiba JO28 towards Chōshi |
| Ichikawa JO24 towards Tokyo | Sōbu Line Rapid | Tsudanuma JO26 towards Chiba |
| Nishi-Funabashi JB30 towards Mitaka | Chūō–Sōbu Line | Higashi-Funabashi JB32 towards Chiba |
| Nishi-Funabashi JB30 towards Mitaka | Chūō–Sōbu Line via Tōzai Line | Higashi-Funabashi JB32 towards Tsudanuma |
Location

The JR East station has two elevated island platforms, with the station building located underneath. The station has a "Midori no Madoguchi" staffed ticket office and also a "View Plaza" travel agency.

=== Platforms ===
| 1 | Chūō-Sōbu Line | for Nishi-Funabashi, Kinshichō, Akihabara, Shinjuku, Nakano, and Mitaka; Tokyo Metro Tozai Line for Nihombashi, Otemachi, and Nakano |
| 2 | Chūō-Sōbu Line | for Tsudanuma, Inage, and Chiba |
| 3 | Sōbu Line (Rapid) | for Kinshichō and Tokyo |
| 4 | Sōbu Line (Rapid) | for Tsudanuma, Chiba, Narita Airport (Terminal 2·3 and Terminal 1), Kimitsu, and Kazusa-Ichinomiya |

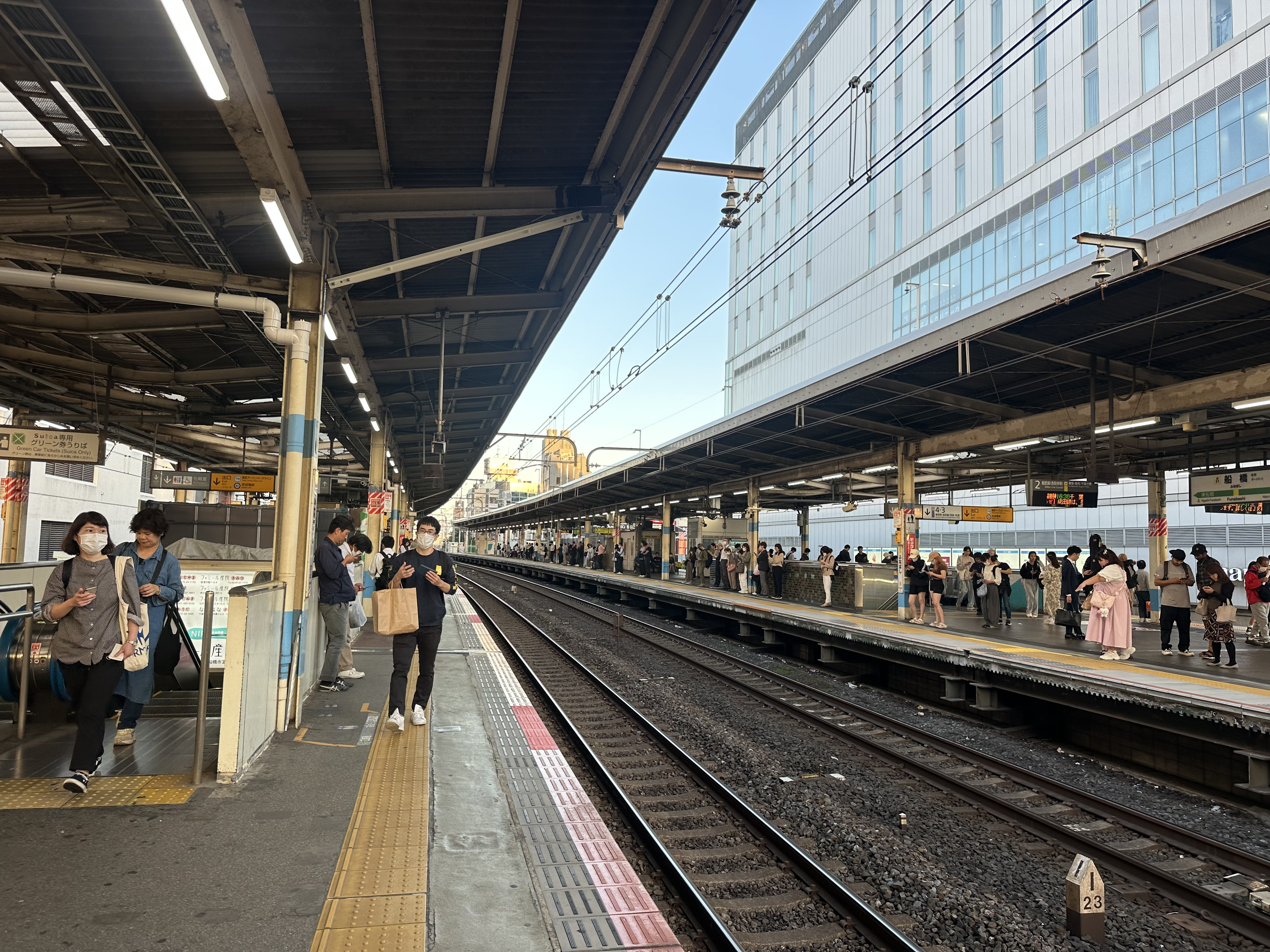
Platforms

== Tobu ==
TD35 Funabashi Station 船橋駅
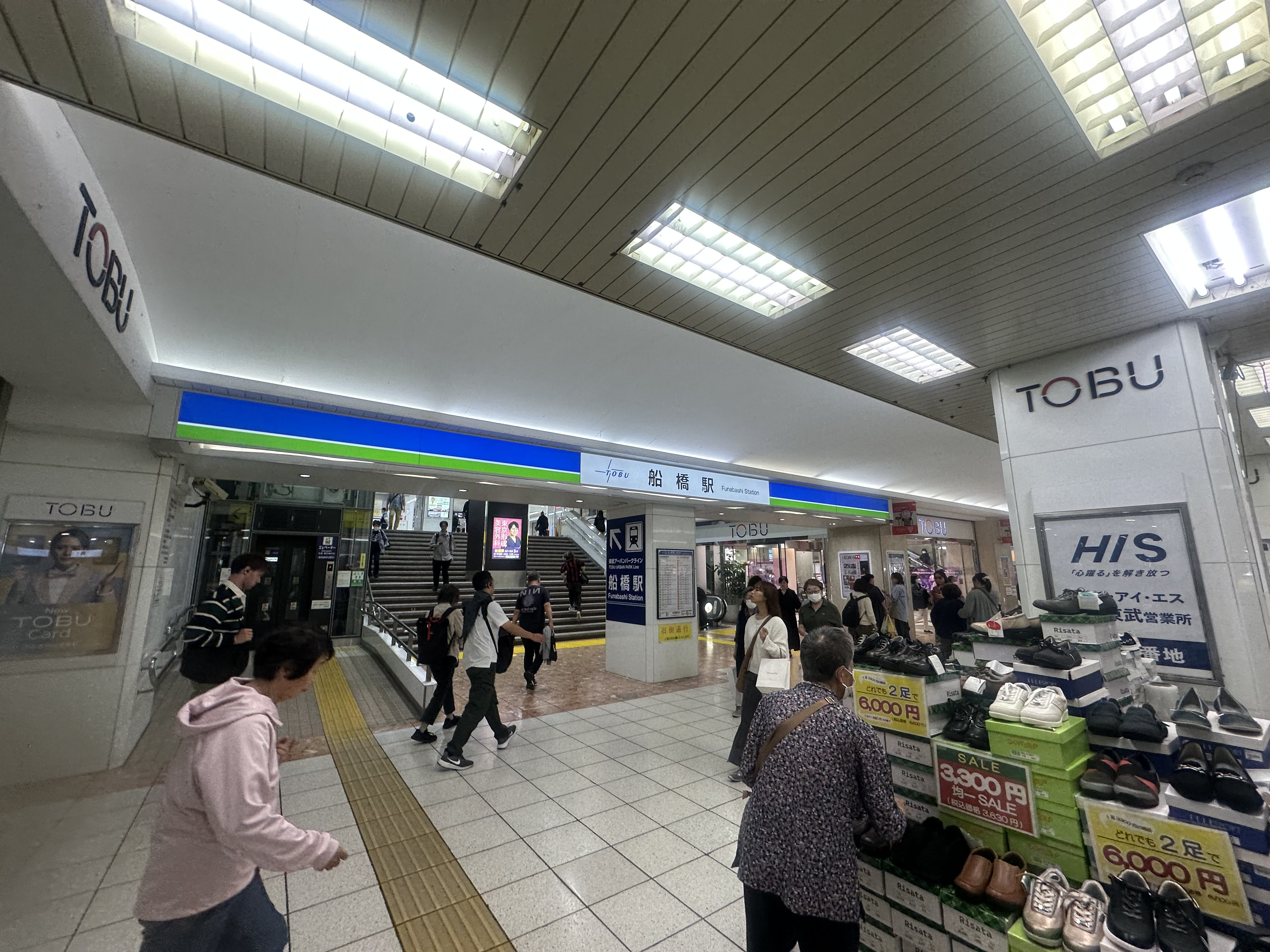
- Tobu Funabashi station entrance in October 2025

General information
- Location: 7-1-1 Honcho Funabashi-shi, Chiba-ken; Japan
- System: Tobu station
- Operator: Tobu Railway
- Line: Tobu Urban Park Line
- Platforms: 1 island platform
- Tracks: 2

Other information
- Station code: TD-35
- Website: railway.tobu.co.jp/guide/station/info/6412.html

History
- Opened: 27 December 1923; 102 years ago

Passengers
- FY2014: 112,009

Services
| Preceding station | Tobu Railway | Following station |
|---|---|---|
| Shin-Kamagaya TD30 towards Ōmiya | Tōbu Urban Park Line Express | Terminus |
| Shin-Funabashi TD34 towards Ōmiya | Tōbu Urban Park Line Local | Terminus |
Location

The Tobu station is elevated and consists of a single elevated island platform serving two tracks, with an elevated station building underneath. Access to the JR East station is by a ground-level concourse.

=== Platforms ===
| 1, 2 | Tobu Urban Park Line | for Kashiwa, Nodashi, Kasukabe, and Ōmiya |

== History ==
What is now the JR East Funabashi Station opened on 20 July 1894. The Tobu station opened on 27 December 1923. The JR East (formerly JNR) station opened on 20 July 1952. It became an elevated structure from 26 October 1983. From 17 March 2012, station numbering was introduced on the Tobu Noda Line, with Funabashi Station becoming "TD-35".

Platform edge doors were installed on the Tobu Urban Park Line platforms in early February 2014.

== Passenger statistics ==
In fiscal 2014, the JR East station was used by an average of 135,322 passengers daily (boarding passengers only), making it the 23rd-busiest station operated by JR East. The passenger figures for the JR East station for previous years are as shown below.

| Fiscal year | Daily average |
|---|---|
| 2000 | 131,611 |
| 2005 | 131,579 |
| 2010 | 134,705 |
| 2014 | 135,322 |

In fiscal 2012, the Tobu station was used by an average of 112,000 passengers daily (entering and exiting passengers).

== Surrounding area ==
- Keisei Funabashi Station ( Keisei Main Line)
- Funabashi FACE

== See also ==
- List of railway stations in Japan
