= Tobu 10000 series =

Electric multiple unit train operated by Tobu Railway in Japan

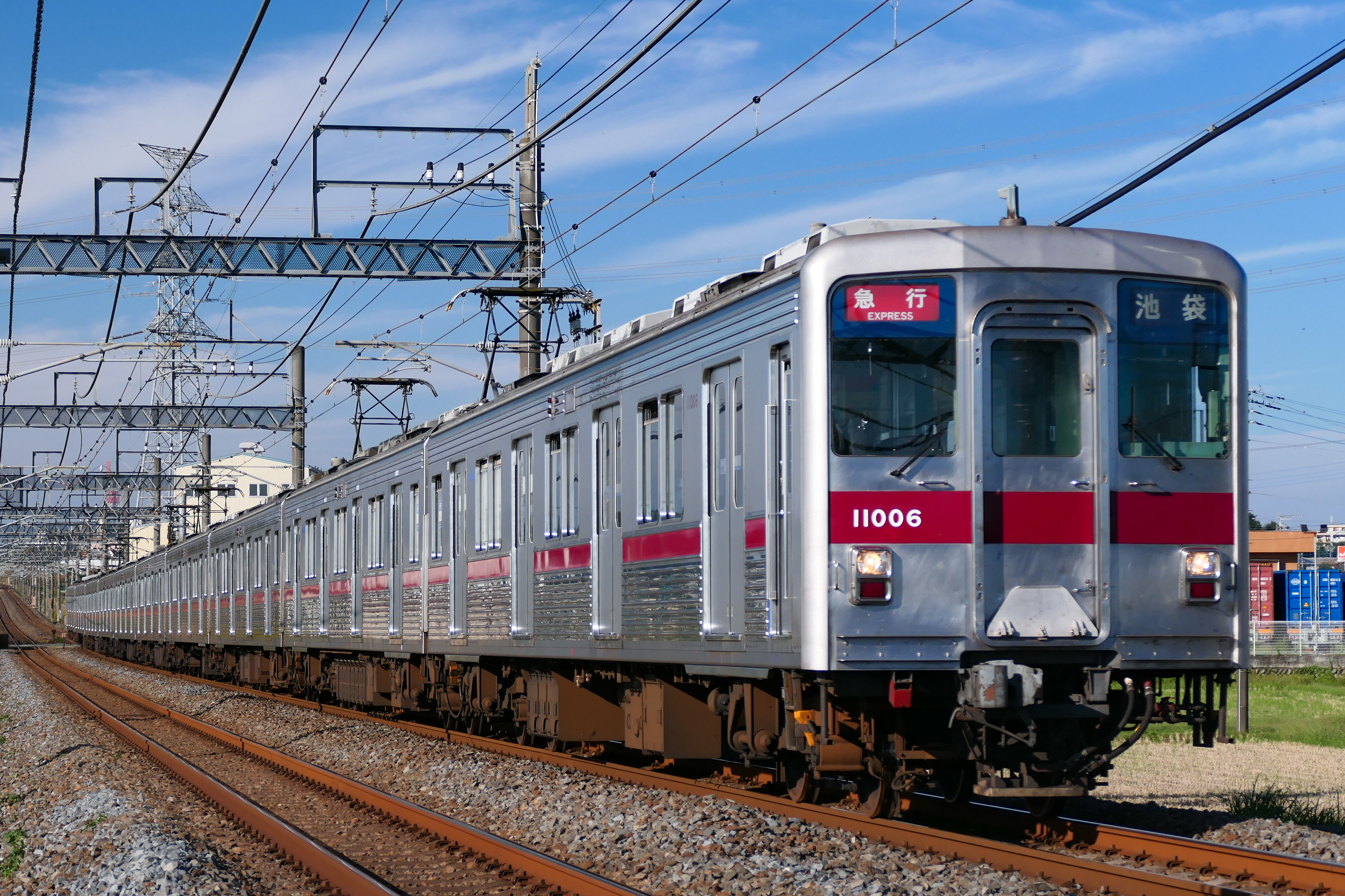
- Tojo Line 10000 series 10-car set 11006, October 2021
- Manufacturers: Alna Kōki, Fuji Heavy Industries, Tokyu Car Corporation
- Replaced: 7300 series, 3000 series
- Constructed: 1983–1995
- Entered service: 1983
- Refurbished: 2007–
- Number built: 486 vehicles
- Formation: 2/4/6/8/10 cars per trainset
- Operator: Tobu Railway
- Depots: Kasukabe, Nanakodai, Shinrinkōen, Shin-Tochigi
- Lines served: Tobu Skytree Line; Tobu Isesaki Line; Tobu Nikko Line; Tobu Urban Park Line; Tobu Tojo Line

Specifications
- Car body construction: Stainless steel
- Car length: 20,000 mm (65 ft 7 in)
- Width: 2,850 mm (9 ft 4 in)
- Doors: 4 pairs per side
- Maximum speed: 110 km/h (68 mph)
- Power output: 140 kW (190 hp) × 4 per motor car
- Acceleration: 2.5 km/(h⋅s) (1.6 mph/s)
- Deceleration: 4.5 km/(h⋅s) (2.8 mph/s) (emergency brake)
- Electric systems: 1,500 V DC (overhead lines)
- Current collection: Pantograph
- Track gauge: 1,067 mm (3 ft 6 in)

The Tobu 10000 series (東武10000系, Tōbu 10000-kei) is a DC electric multiple unit (EMU) commuter train type operated in Japan by the private railway operator Tobu Railway since 1983.

First entering service in 1983 on the Tobu Tojo Line (1984 on the Tobu Isesaki Line), production continued through to 1995, with a total of 486 vehicles built.

== Variants ==
The type was broadly divided into four sub-series, as follows.

- 10000 series
- 10030 series
- 10050 series (minor variant of 10030 series)
- 10080 series

== 10000 series ==
These were built to replace the remaining 7300 series trains on the Tojo Line, with the first trains entering service from 22 December 1983. 10000 series sets were also introduced on the Isesaki Line from 20 March 1984.

The corrugated stainless steel body design was based on the prototype 9000 series set built in 1981, while the front end design was derived from the earlier 8000 series EMUs. The seat covers were initially brown ("Colorado orange"), but later changed to the standard light green colour used on sets built from 1986.

Sets are configured as 2-, 6-, 8-, and 10-car sets. The four 10-car sets (11003 to 11006) used on the Tojo Line were formed in 1989 by adding two newly built intermediate cars to 8-car sets 11803 to 11806.

Two two-car sets (11201 and 11202) were transferred to the Tojo Line in May 2008 to augment the two remaining eight-car sets following the decision to run only ten-car formations on the Tojo Line from the start of the June 2008 timetable.

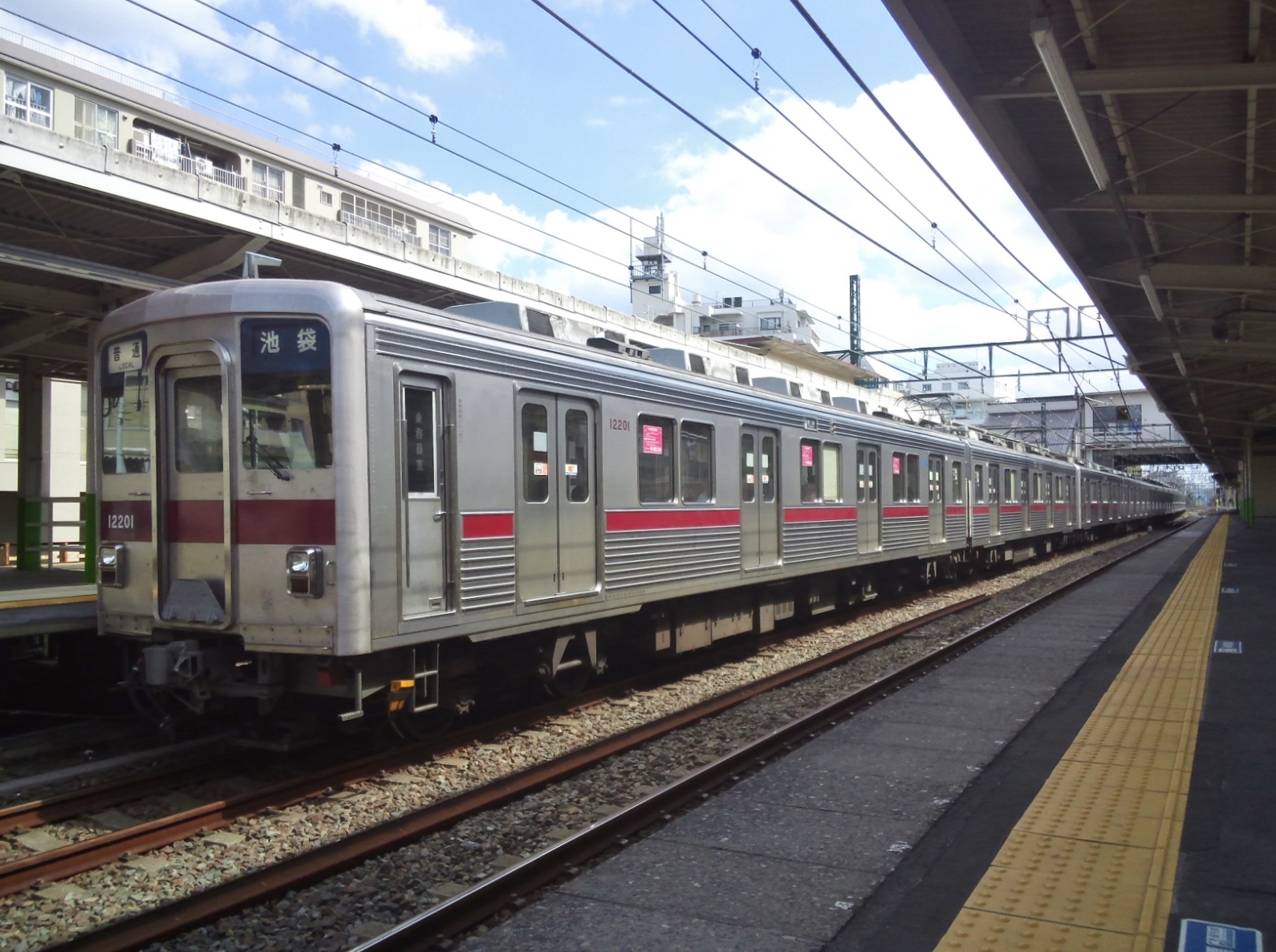
10000 series 2-car set 11201 at the rear of a 10-car formation on the Tobu Tojo Line in September 2013

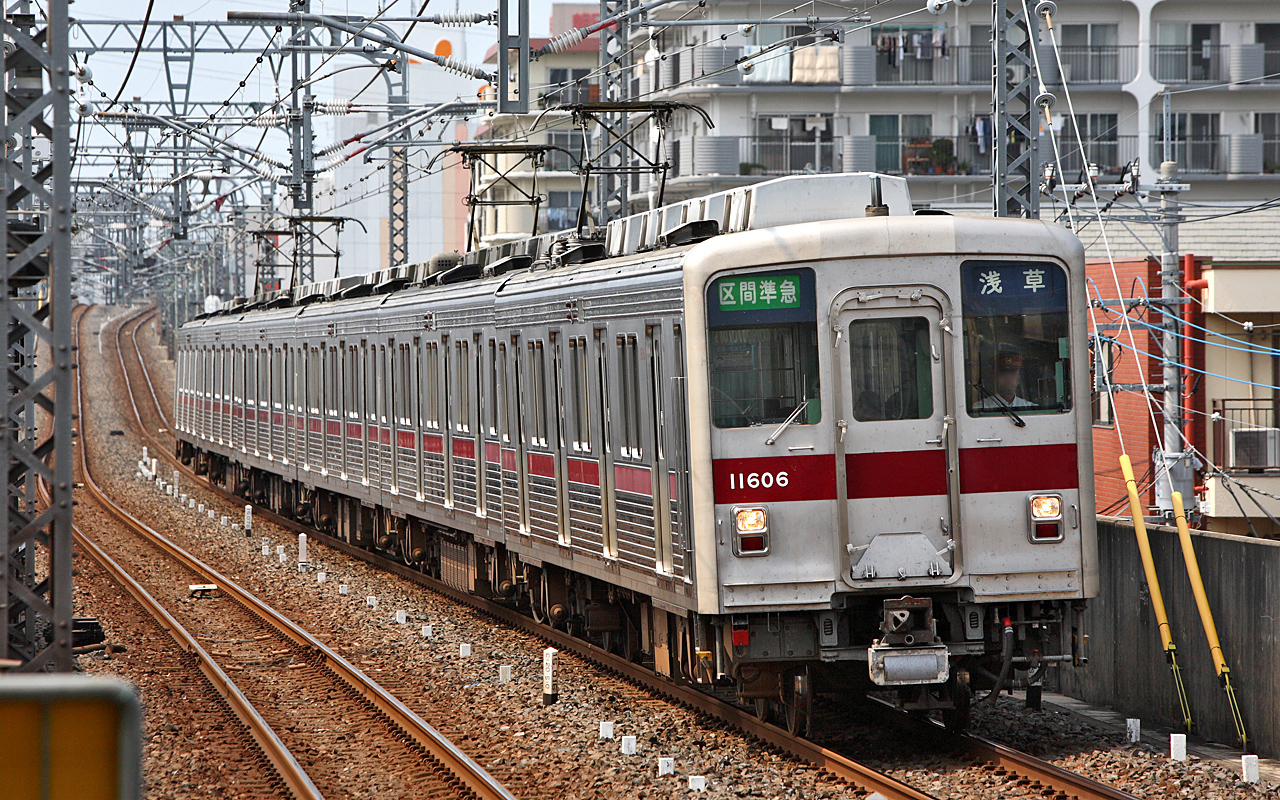
10000 series 6-car set 11606 in June 2008

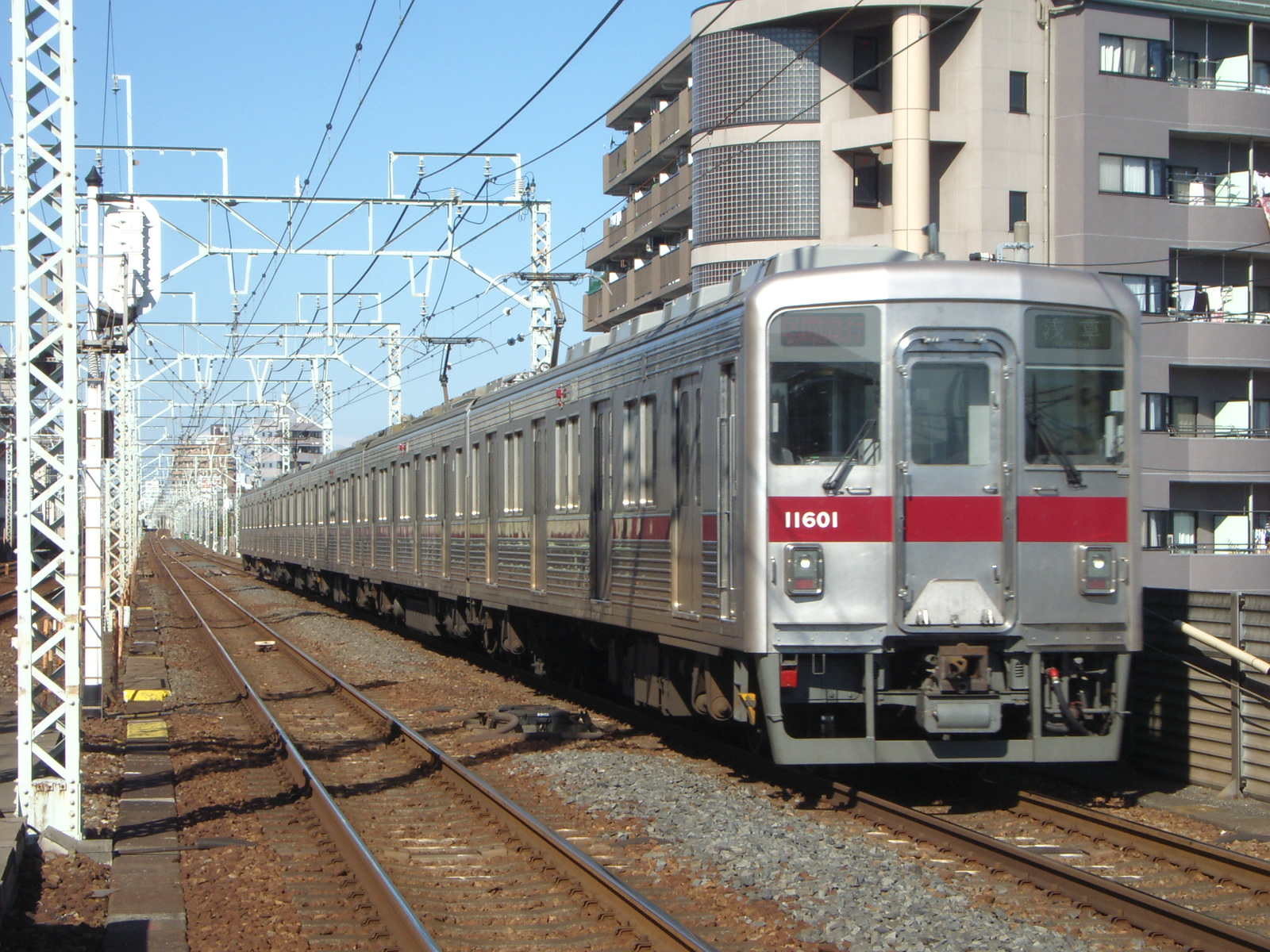
Refurbished 10000 series 6-car set 11601 in January 2008

Set numbers	Year built	External features	Internal features
11201 11601 11602 11801 11802	1983		
11202 11603 11604	1984		
11203 11204 11803~11805	1985	LEDs used for bodyside indicator lamps.	
11605 11806	1986	Painted running numbers instead of numberplates.	Internal doors fitted.
11606~11609	1986	Painted running numbers instead of numberplates.	Brown floor covering (instead of green), light green seat covers.
15003~15006 16003~16006	1989		

118 vehicles (27 sets) were built.

=== Formations ===
==== 10-car sets ====
Car No.	1	2	3	4	5	6	7	8	9	10
Designation	Tc2	M2	M1	T2	TM1	M4	T1	M2	M1	Tc1
Numbering	10000	19000	18000	17000	16000	15000	14000	13000	12000	11000

The M1 and M4 cars are each fitted with two scissors type pantographs.

==== 8-car sets ====
Designation	Tc1	M1	M2	T1	T2	M1	M2	Tc2
Numbering	11800	12800	13800	14800	15800	16800	17800	18800

The M1 cars are each fitted with two scissors type pantographs.

==== 6-car sets ====
Designation	Tc1	M1	M2	T3	M3	Tc2
Numbering	11600	12600	13600	14600	15600	16600

The M1 and M3 cars were originally fitted with two scissors type pantographs, but these were replaced by two single-arm pantographs on the M1 cars and one single-arm pantograph on the M3 cars after refurbishment.

==== 2-car sets ====
Designation	Mc	Tc3
Numbering	11200	12200

The Mc cars are fitted with two scissors type pantographs.

=== Refurbishment ===
From 2007, Isesaki Line 10000 series sets began receiving life extension refurbishment similar to that applied to the 9000 series EMUs. This involved new interiors with sculpted seats and dark blue moquette, and the addition of front-end skirts, single-arm pantographs, high-intensity headlights, and full-colour LED destination indicators.

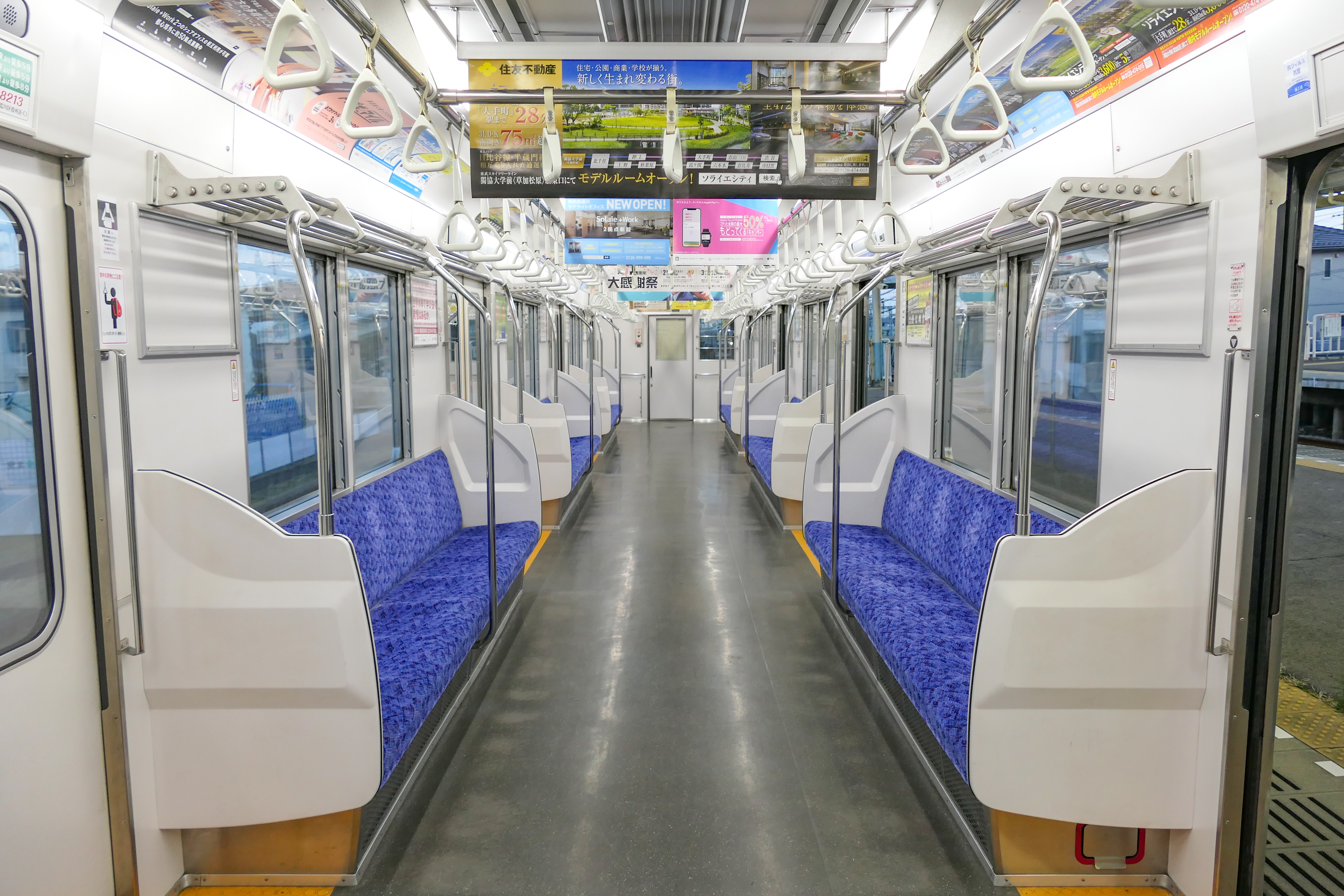
Interior of refurbished set in October 2021

== 10030 series ==
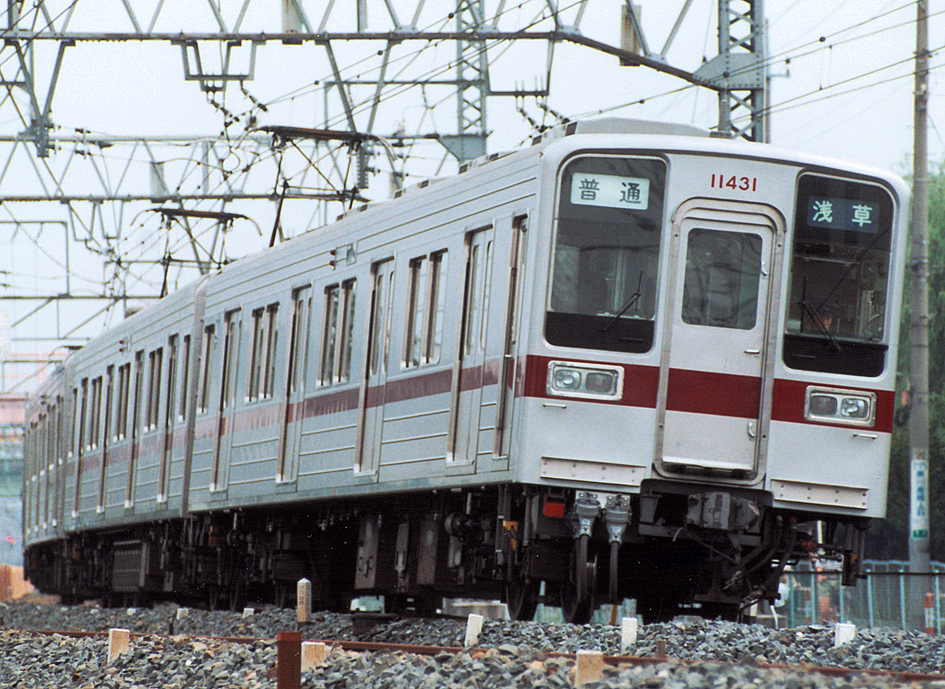
10030 series formation headed by 4-car set 11431 on the Tobu Isesaki Line, with original style coupler and jumper cables in 1988

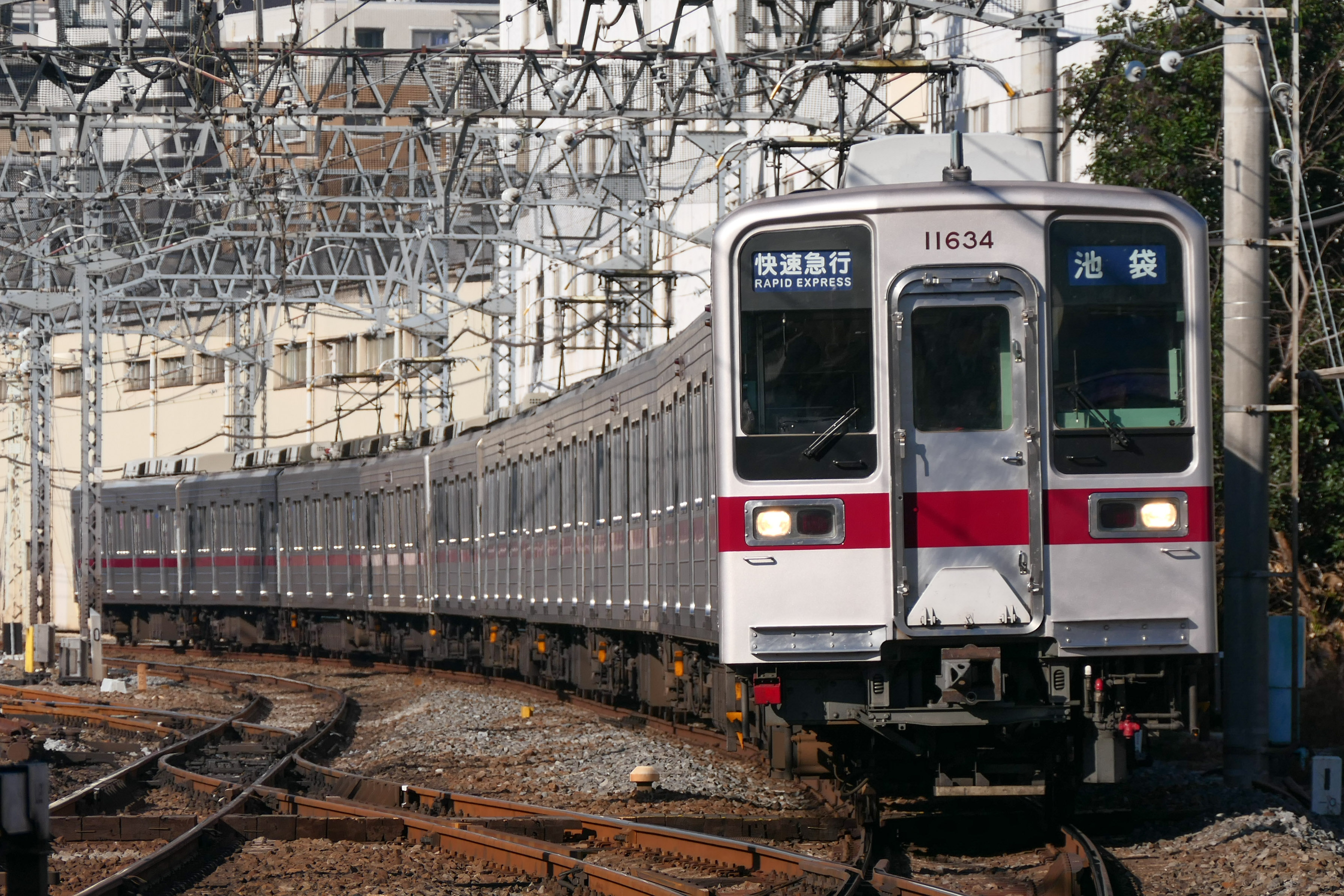
10030 series 10-car formation headed by set 11634 in December 2019

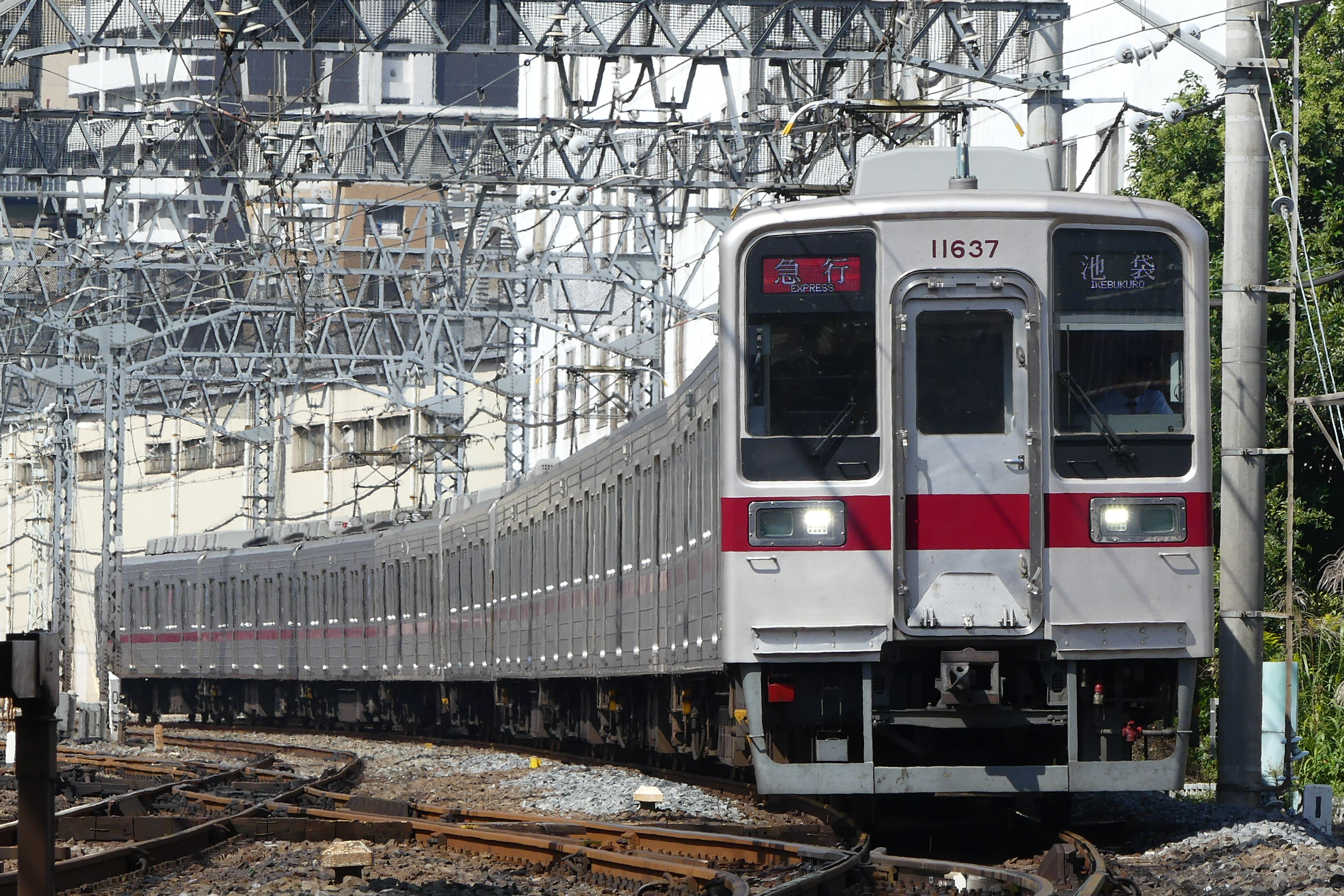
Refurbished 10-car formation led by set 11637 on the Tobu Tojo Line in October 2017

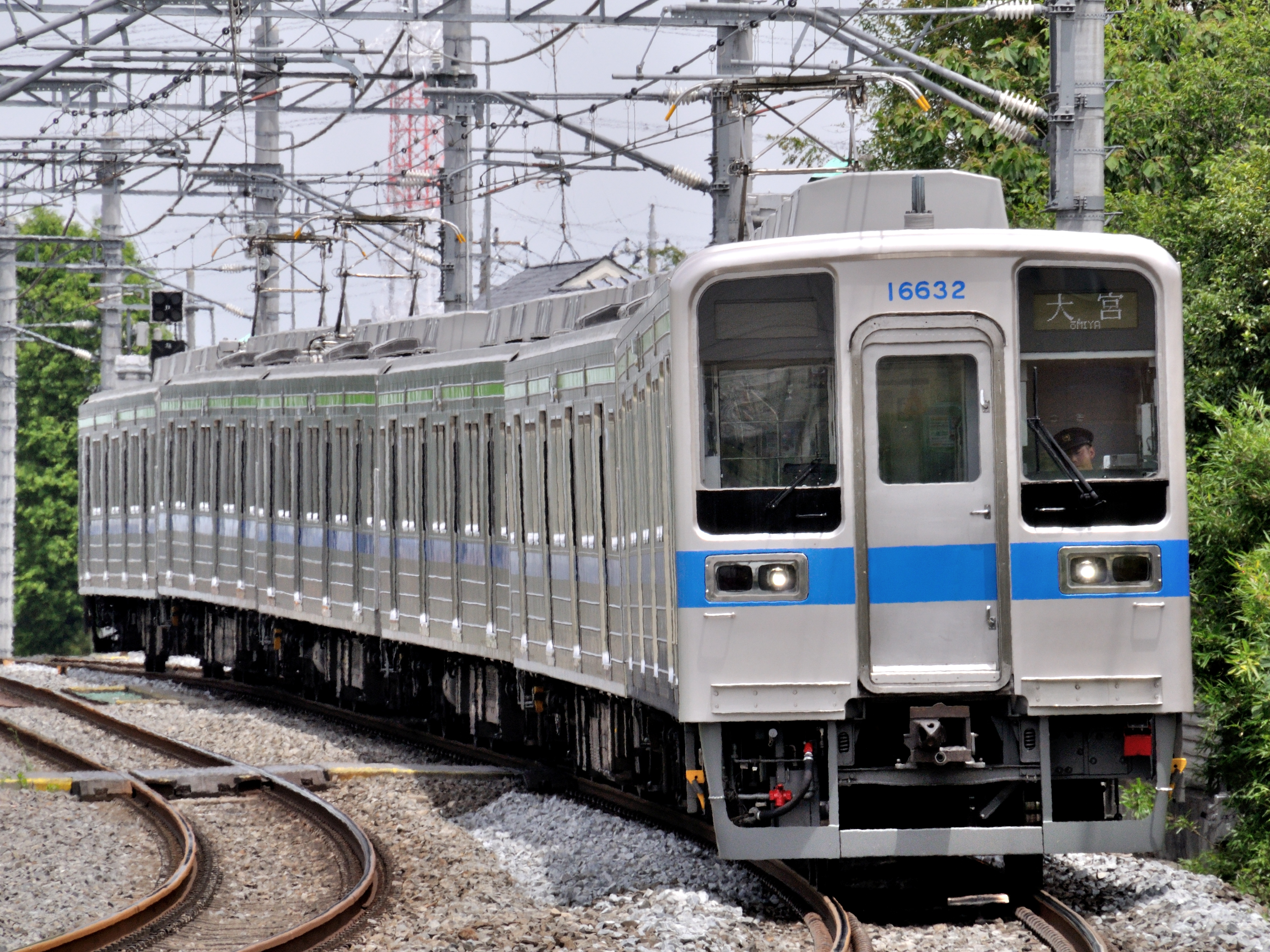
A refurbished 6-car set on the Tobu Noda Line in June 2013

The 10030 subseries featured a new lightweight stainless steel body design, with a reduced number of bodyside corrugations and dull finish. A new bolsterless bogie was used. Internally, seat width was increased from 425 mm to 450 mm.

Two ten-car sets (11031 and 11032) were introduced in 1989 on the Tojo Line, the first time fixed ten-car sets had been used on Tobu overground trains.

Set numbers	Year built	External features	Internal features
11431 11432	1987		
11433 11434 11631~11633	1988		
11435~11438 11634 11031 11032	1989	Aluminium honeycomb construction used for doors	
11439~11443 11635~11639	1990	Radio receiver fitted.	
11444~11448 11640~11644	1991		Grab handles increased and changed from circular to triangular.

176 vehicles (33 sets) were built.

=== Formations ===
==== 10-car sets ====
Car No.	1	2	3	4	5	6	7	8	9	10
Designation	Tc2	M2	M1	T2	TM1	M4	T1	M2	M1	Tc1
Numbering	10030	19030	18030	17030	16030	15030	14030	13030	12030	11030

The M1 and M4 cars are each fitted with two scissors type pantographs.

Some former 4- and 6-car sets have been modified as permanently coupled 10-car sets for use on the Tojo Line.

Car No.	1	2	3	4	5	6	7	8	9	10
Designation	Tc2	M2	M1	T	T	M3	T3	M2	M1	Tc1
Numbering	14430	13430	12430	11430	16630	15630	14630	13630	12630	11630

The M1 and M3 cars are each fitted with two scissors type pantographs.

==== 6-car sets ====
Car No.	5	6	7	8	9	10
Designation	Tc2	M3	T3	M2	M1	Tc1
Numbering	16630	15630	14630	13630	12630	11630

The M1 and M3 cars are each fitted with two scissors type pantographs.

==== 4-car sets ====
Car No.	1	2	3	4
Designation	Tc2	M2	M1	Tc1
Numbering	14430	13430	12430	11430

The M1 cars are fitted with two scissors type pantographs.

=== Interior ===
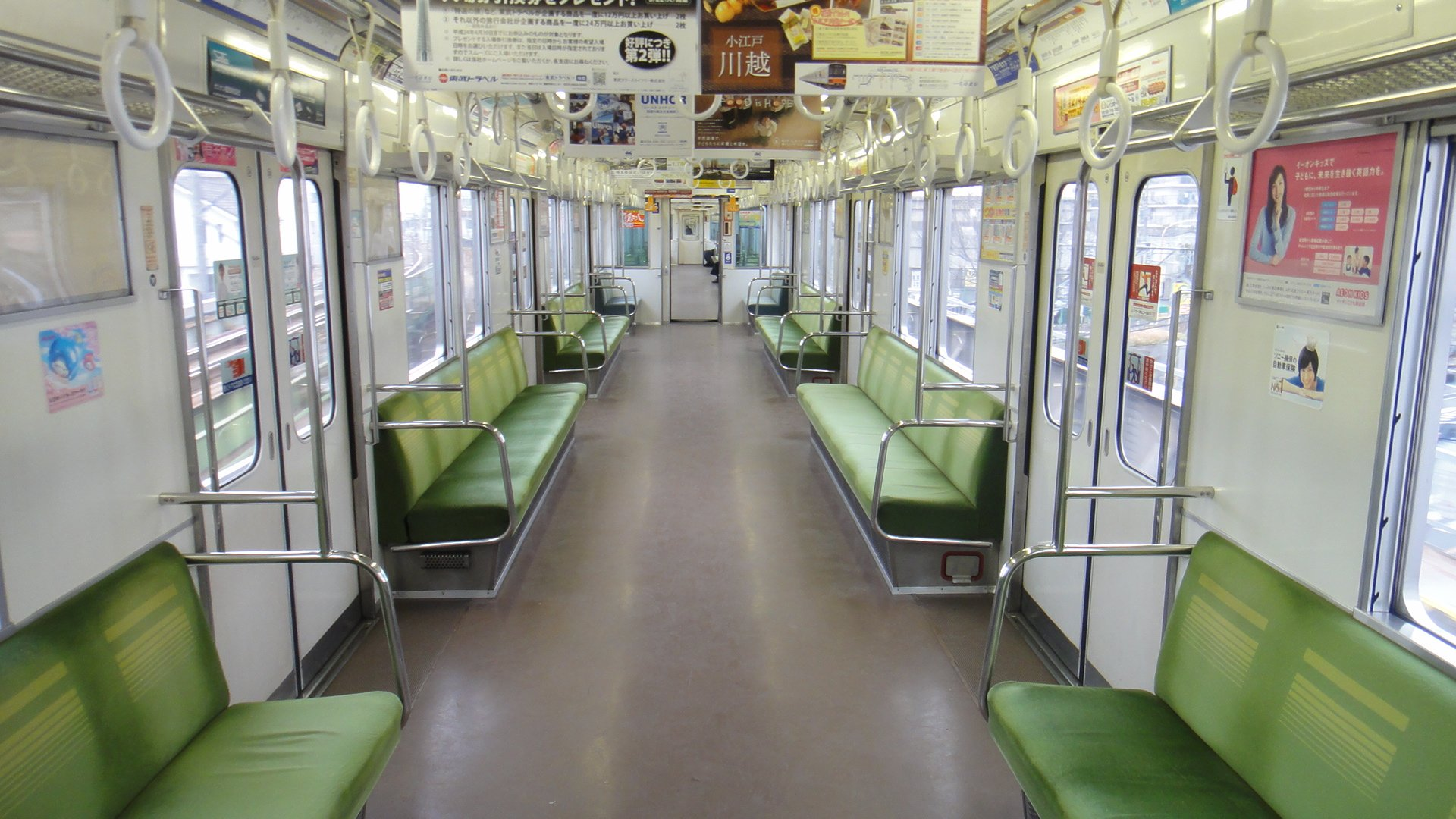
Interior view of a Tojo Line 11030 series set in February 2012

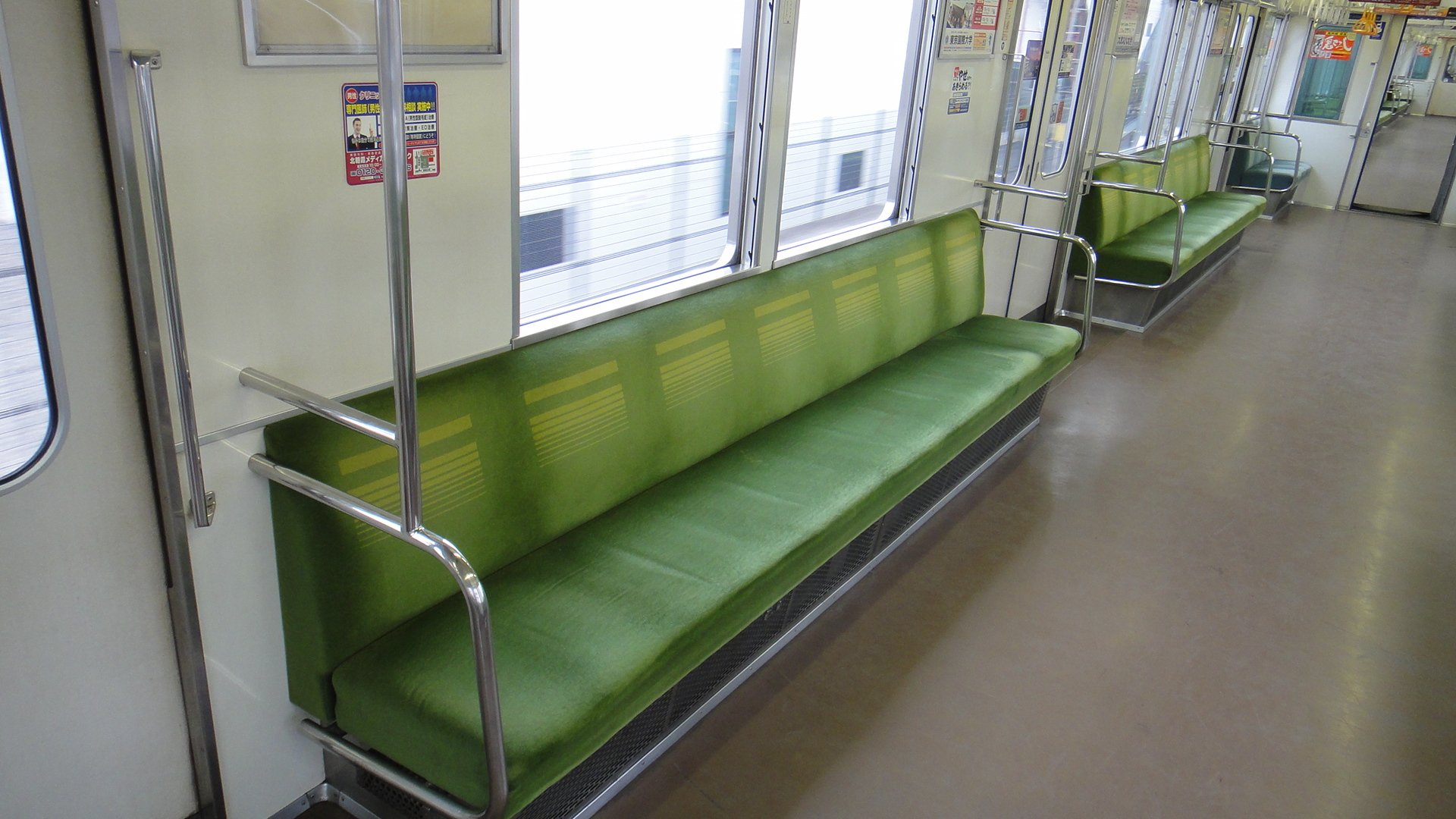
Bench seating in a Tojo Line 11030 series set in February 2012

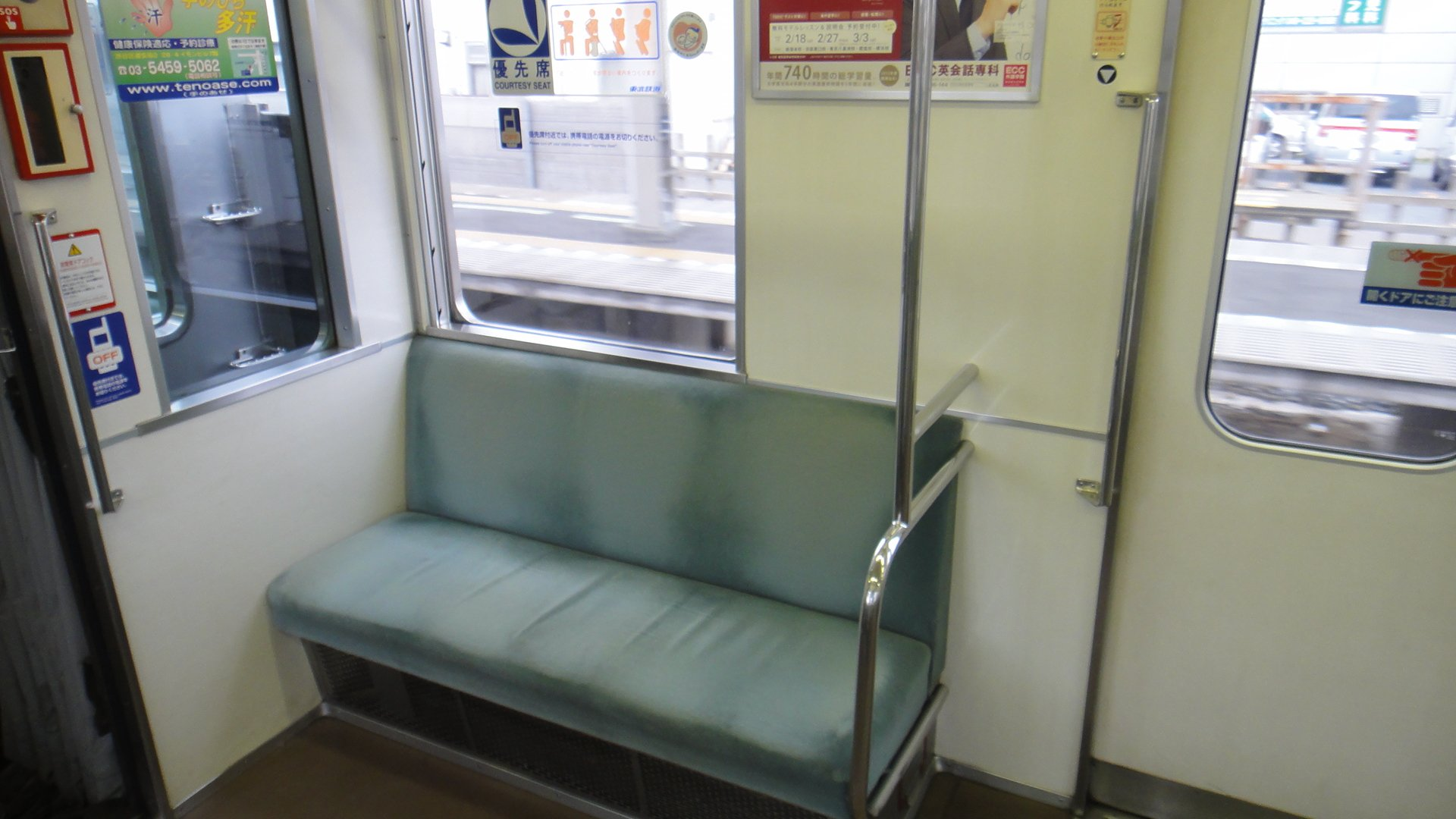
Priority seating in a Tojo Line 11030 series set in February 2012

=== Refurbishment ===
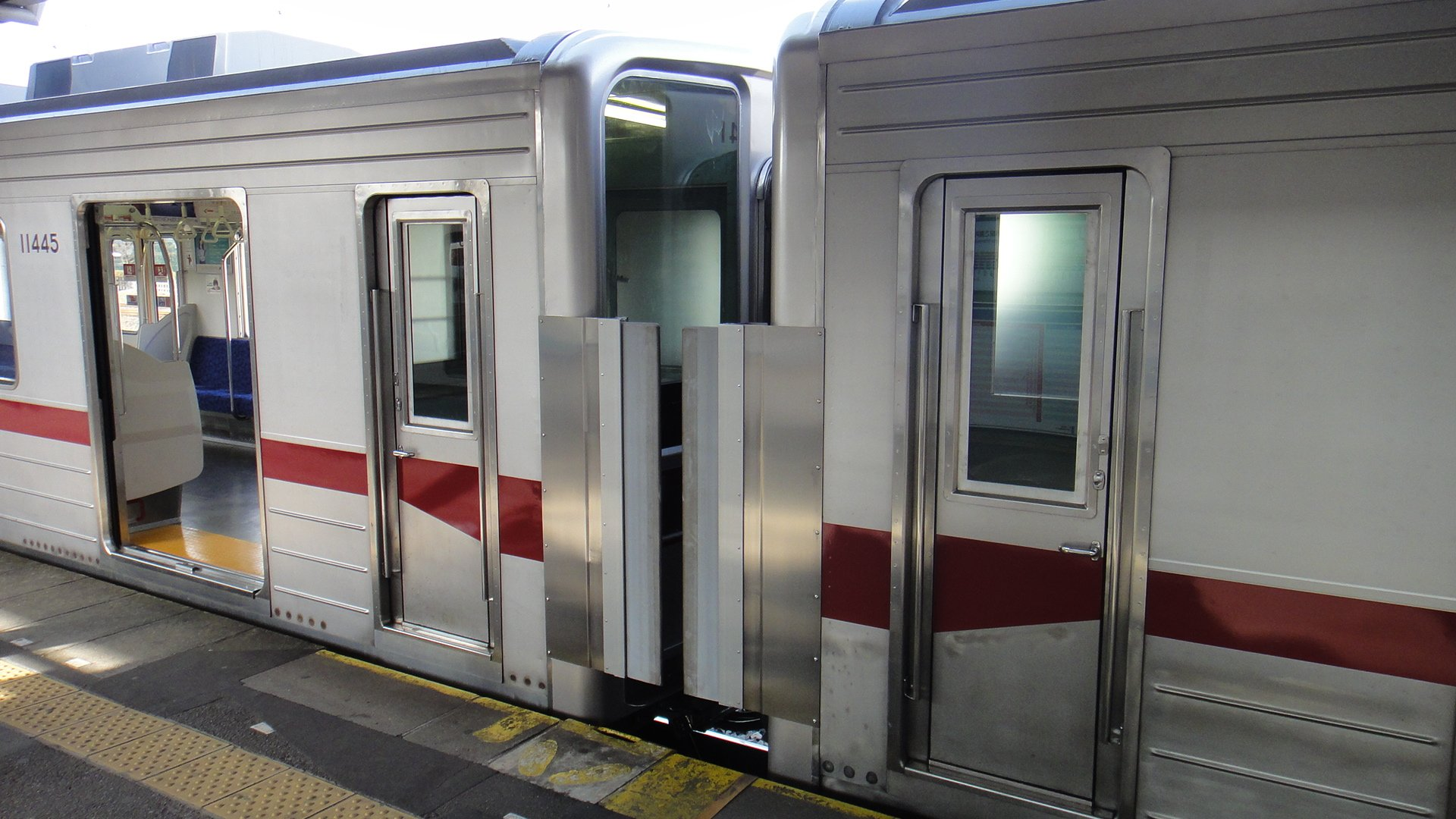
Permanently coupled former driving cabs in a refurbished Tojo Line 4+6-car formation in February 2012

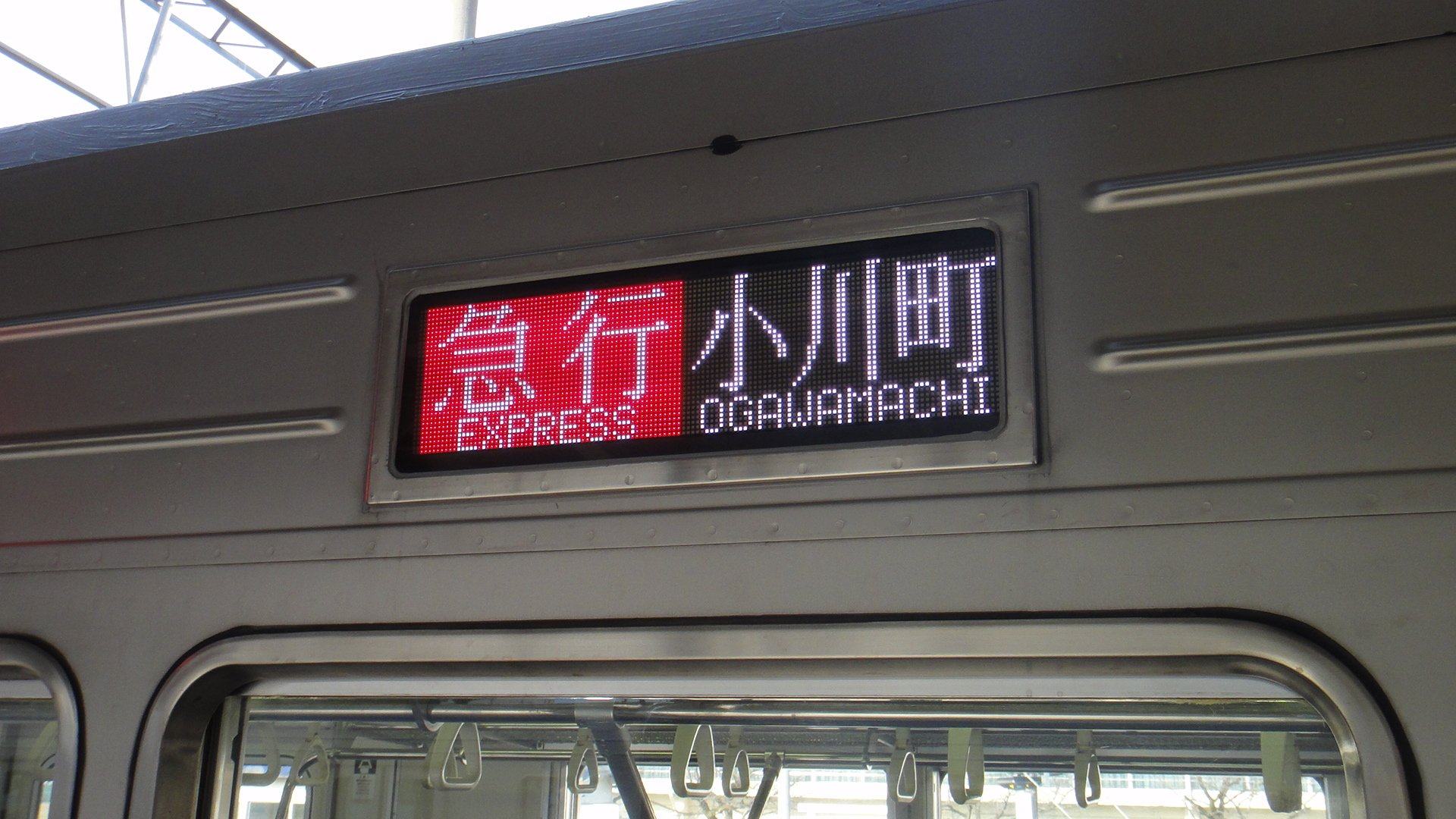
Full-colour LED destination indicators on a refurbished Tojo Line 10030 series set in February 2012

Isesaki Line 10030 series sets began receiving life extension refurbishment from 2011, with the first set returned to service in March 2011. Refurbishment involves new interiors, and the addition of front-end skirts, high-intensity headlights, and full-colour LED destination indicators.

The first refurbished pair of Tojo Line 10030 series sets, 6-car set 11641 and 4-car set 11445, entered service on 1 February 2012. The refurbished Tojo Line 4- and 6-car sets are formed as permanently coupled 10-car sets with the equipment removed from the former inner driving cabs (former KuHa 11400 and KuHa 16600 cars becoming SaHa 11400 and SaHa 16600).

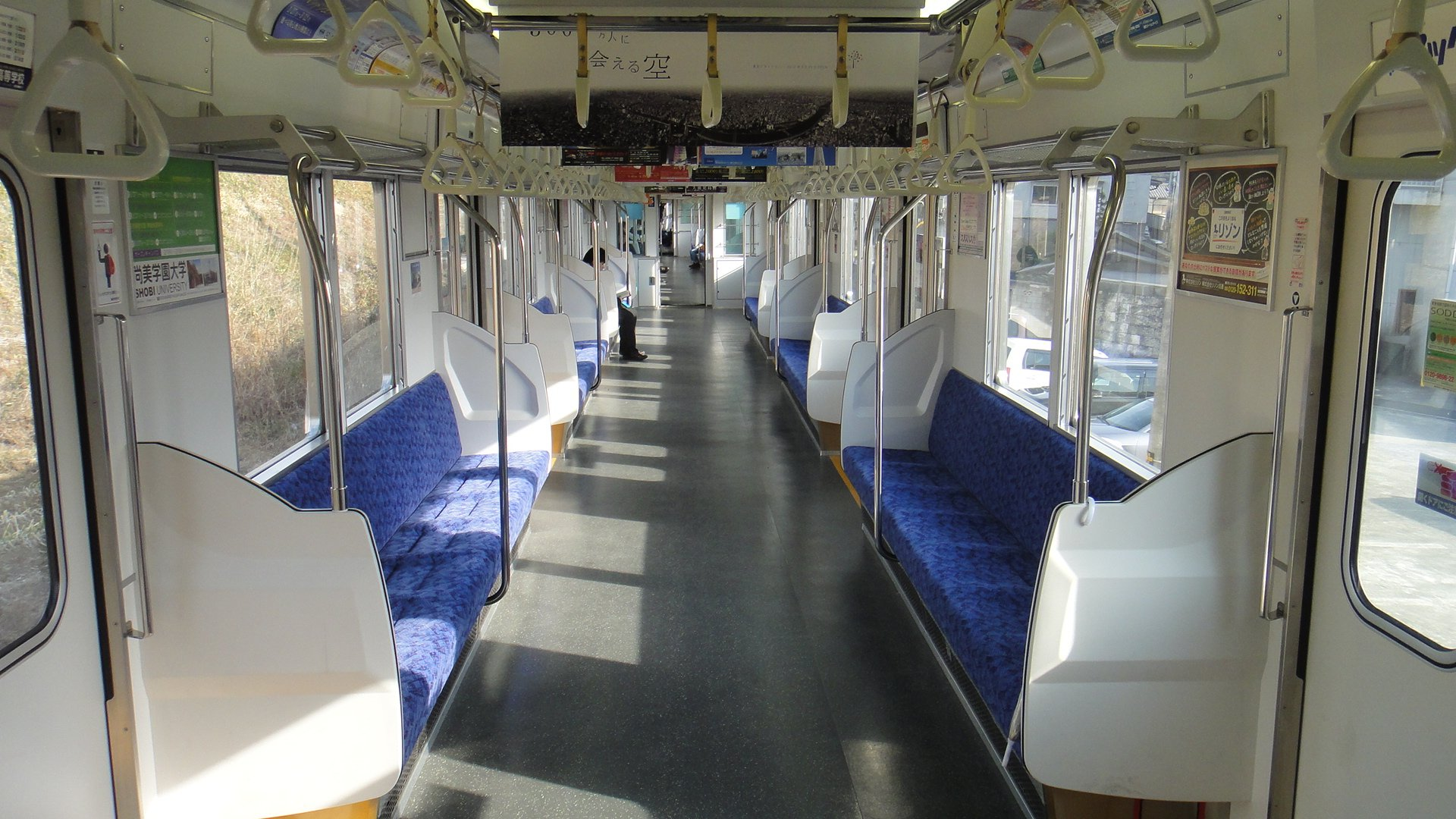
Interior view of a refurbished Tojo Line 10030 series set in February 2012

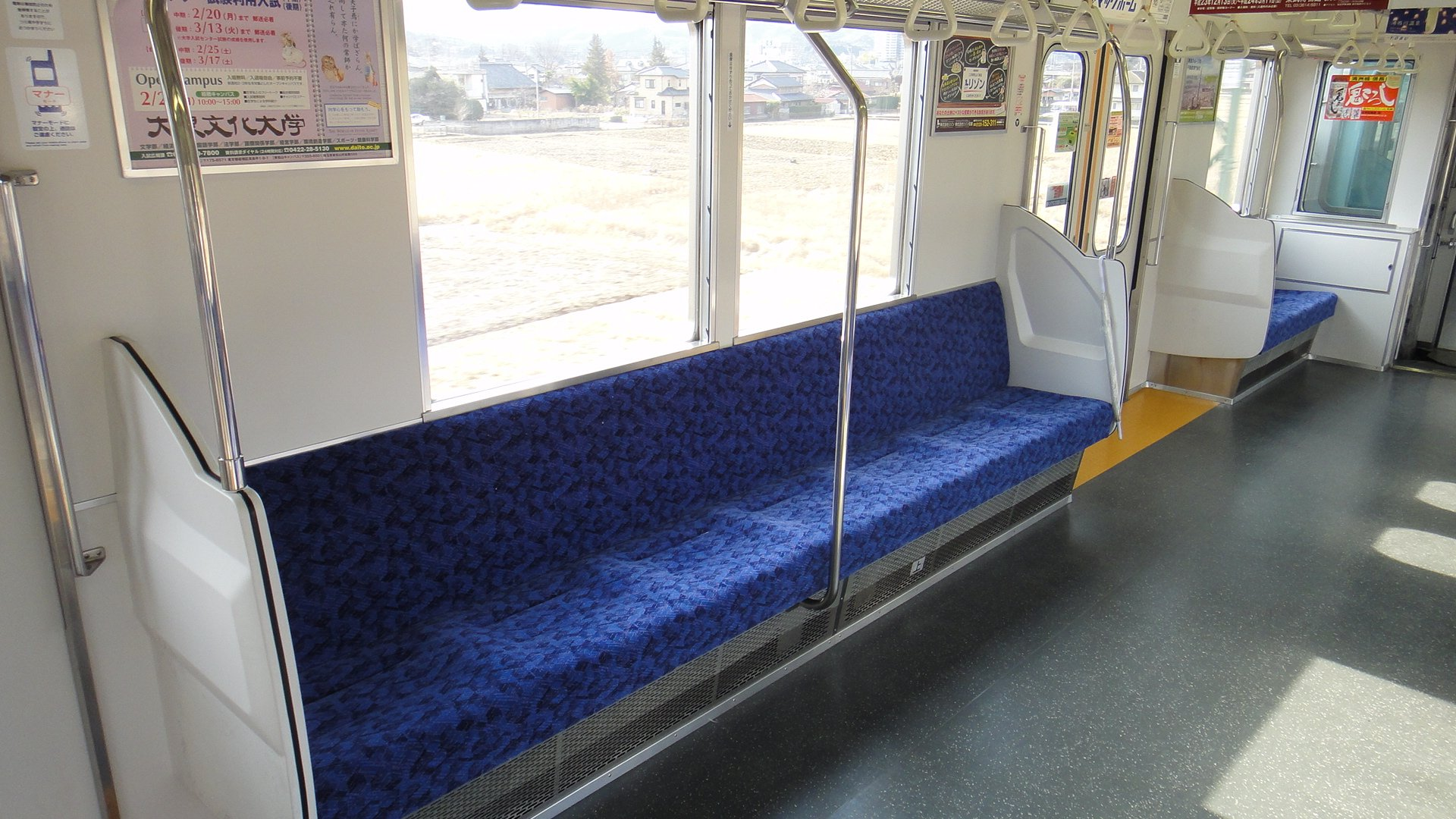
New sculpted bench seating in a refurbished Tojo Line 10030 series set in February 2012

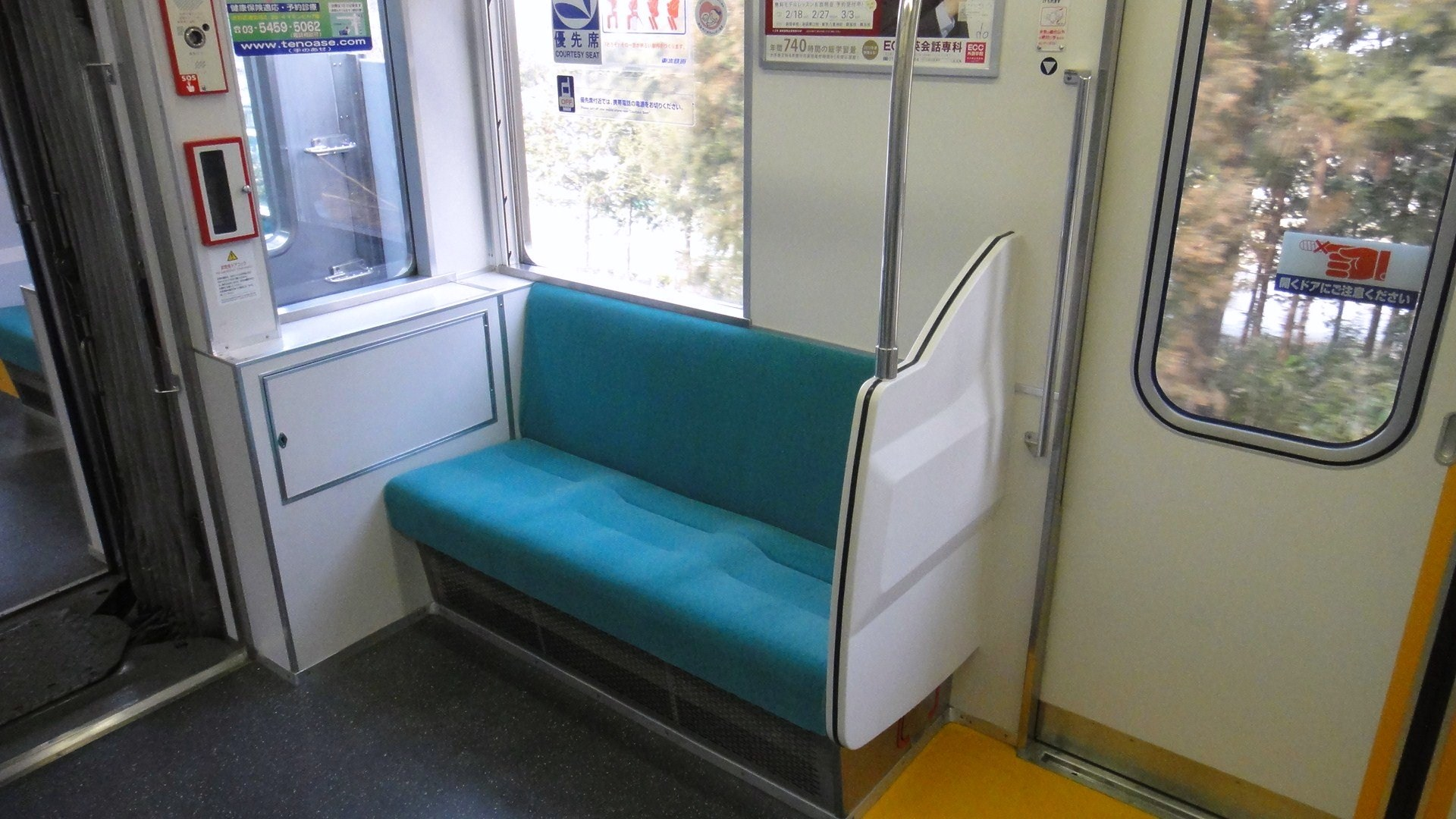
Priority seating in a refurbished Tojo Line 10030 series set in February 2012

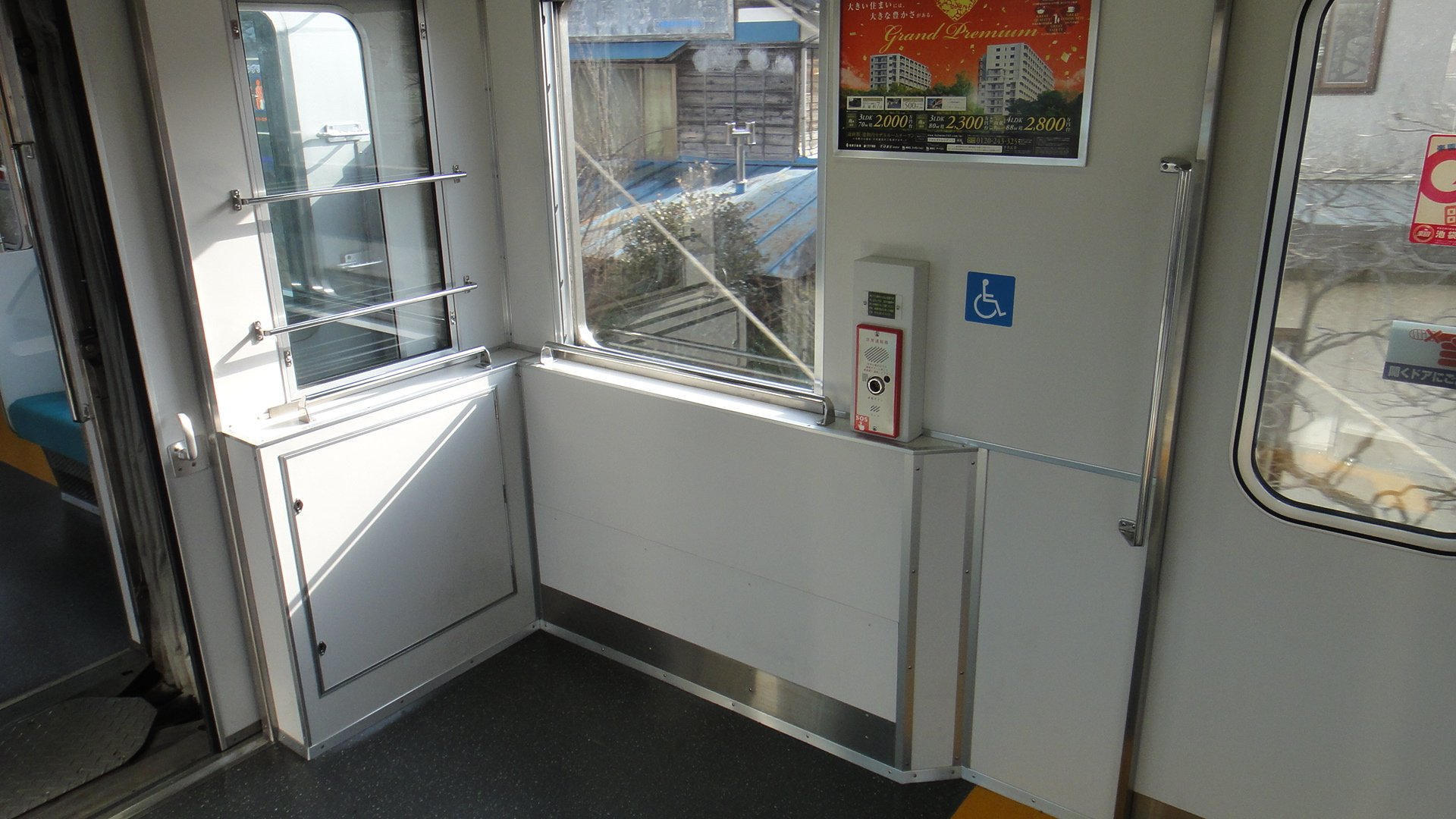
Wheelchair space in a refurbished Tojo Line 10030 series set in February 2012

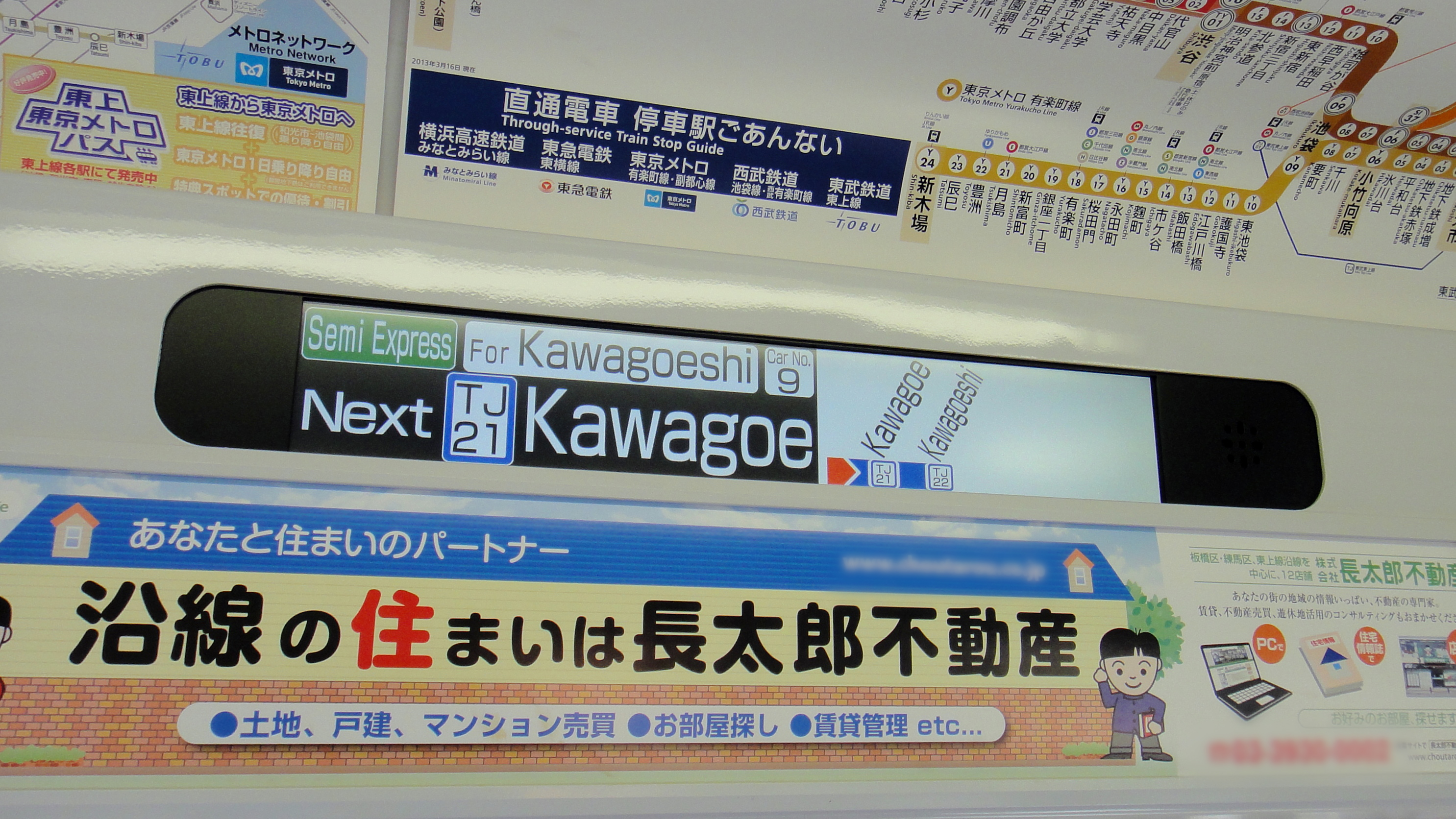
LCD passenger information display inside refurbished Tojo Line 10030 series set 11640 in February 2014

== 10050 series ==
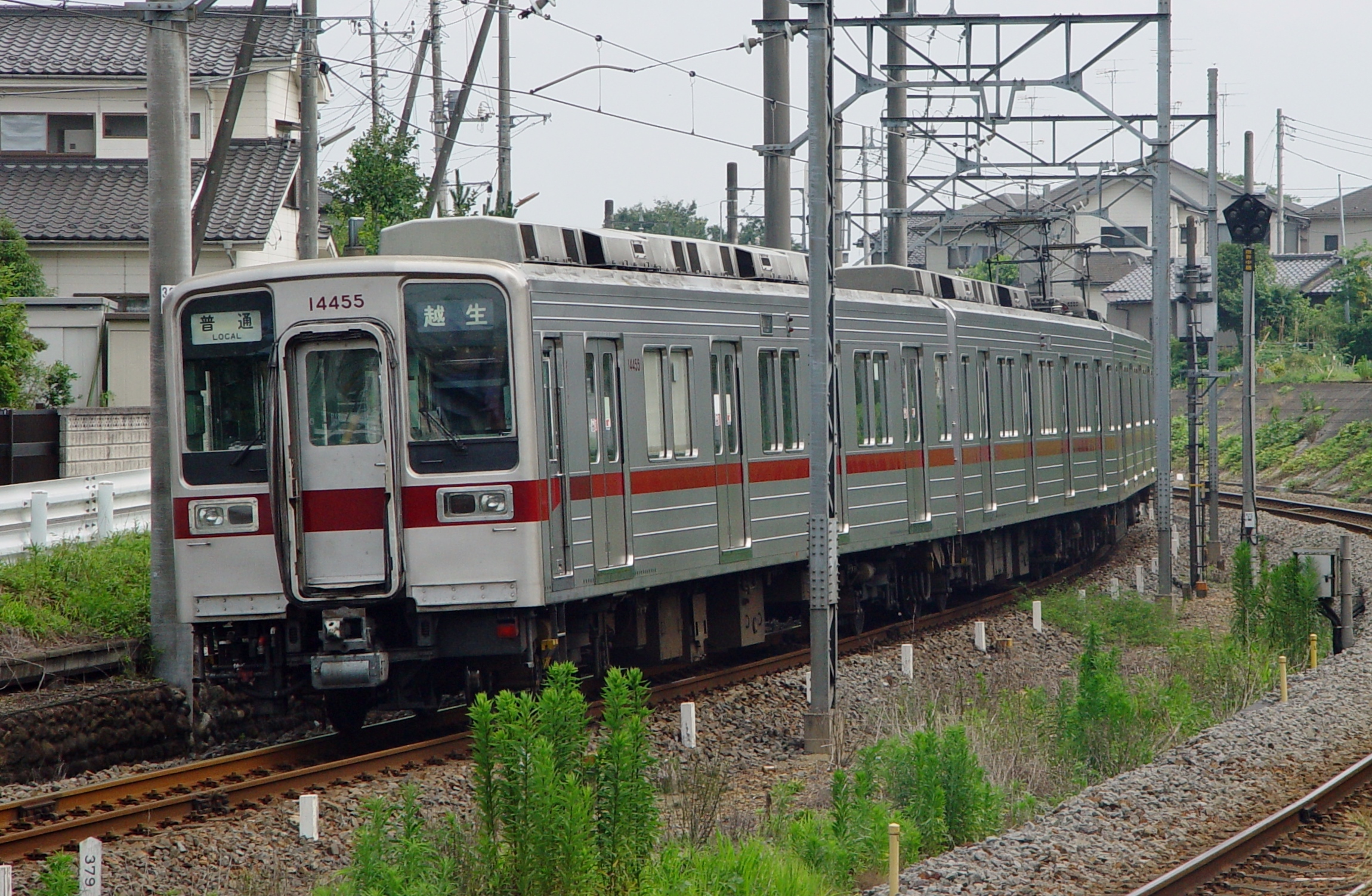
10050 series 4-car set 11455 on the Tobu Ogose Line in July 2004

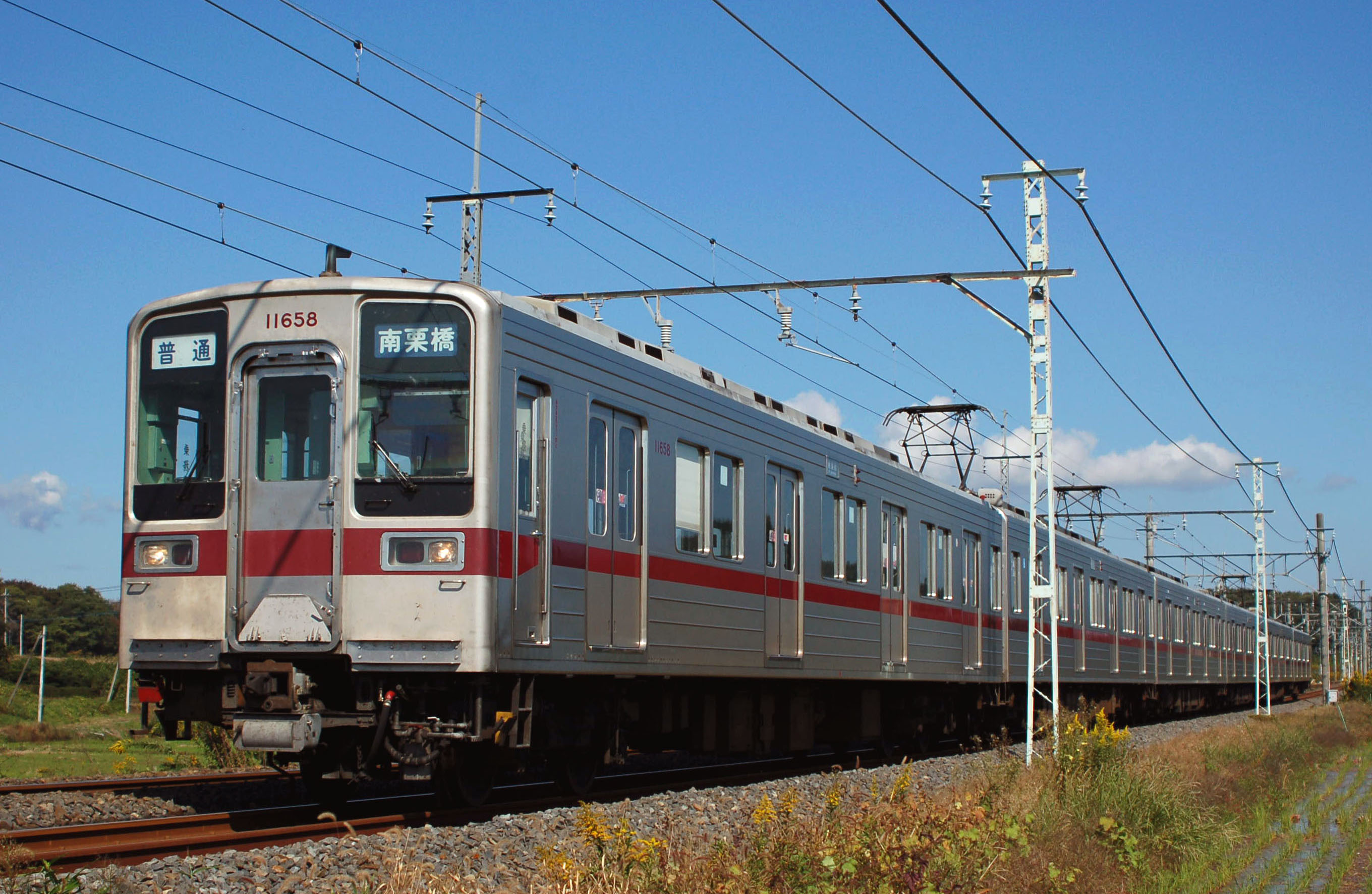
10050 series 6-car set 11658 in October 2007

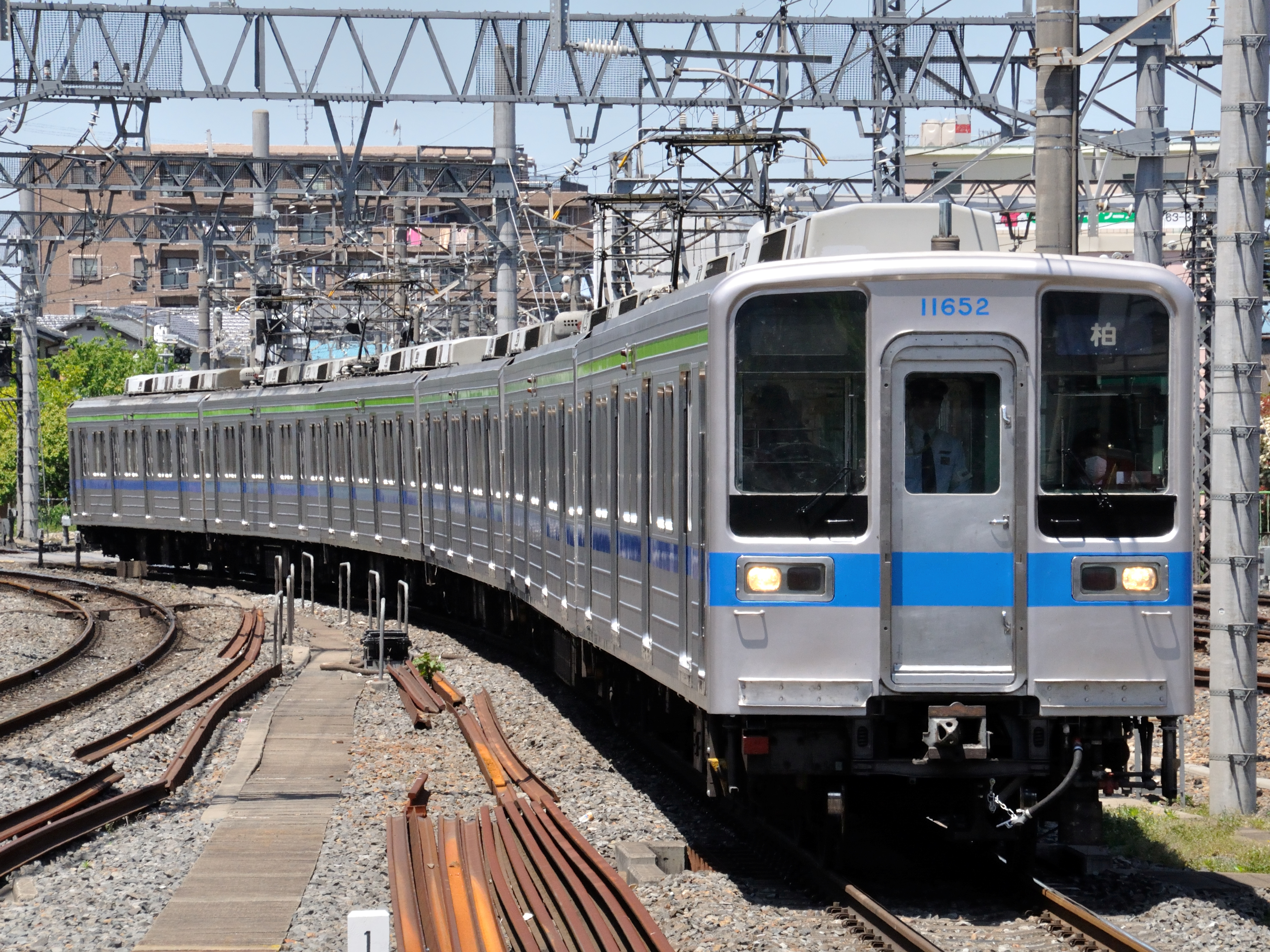
10050 series 6-car set 11652 in new Noda Line colour scheme in May 2013

This sub-series was built from 1992 to replace non-air-conditioned 3000 series trains. The design incorporated a number of further minor changes to the previous 10030 series design.

	Year built	External features	Internal features
11251~11255 11451 11452 11651~11657	1992		Inclusion of wheelchair spaces.
11453~11454 11658~11660	1993		
11256~11262 11455 11456 11661~11664	1994		
11263 11264 11457 11458 11665	1995	Ventilator units removed. Single-arm pantograph (Set 11267 only)	

188 vehicles were built.

=== Formations ===
==== 6-car sets ====
Designation	Tc1	M1	M2	T3	M3	Tc2
Numbering	11650	12650	13650	14650	15650	16650

The M1 and M3 cars are each fitted with two scissors type pantographs.

==== 4-car sets ====
Designation	Tc1	M1	M2	Tc2
Numbering	11450	12450	13450	14450

The M1 cars are fitted with two scissors type pantographs.

==== 2-car sets ====
Designation	Mc	Tc3
Numbering	11250	12250

The Mc cars are fitted with two scissors type pantographs (single-arm type on set 11267).

== 10080 series ==
Identical in outward appearance to other 10030 series sets, one 4-car set (11480) was built in 1988 to test VVVF control equipment, which was subsequently used on the 100 series Spacia EMUs and later commuter EMU types. Car 11480 of this set was experimentally repainted at Kasukabe depot for evaluation with blue/white/light blue stripes to match the colour scheme applied to the 8000 series sets, but this colour scheme was ultimately not used.

Set 11480 was refurbished in 2015, returning to service on 15 August 2015.

=== Formation ===
Designation	Tc1	M1	M2	Tc2
Numbering	11480	12480	13480	14480

The M1 cars are fitted with two scissors type pantographs.
