= Tobu 7800 series =

Japanese train type

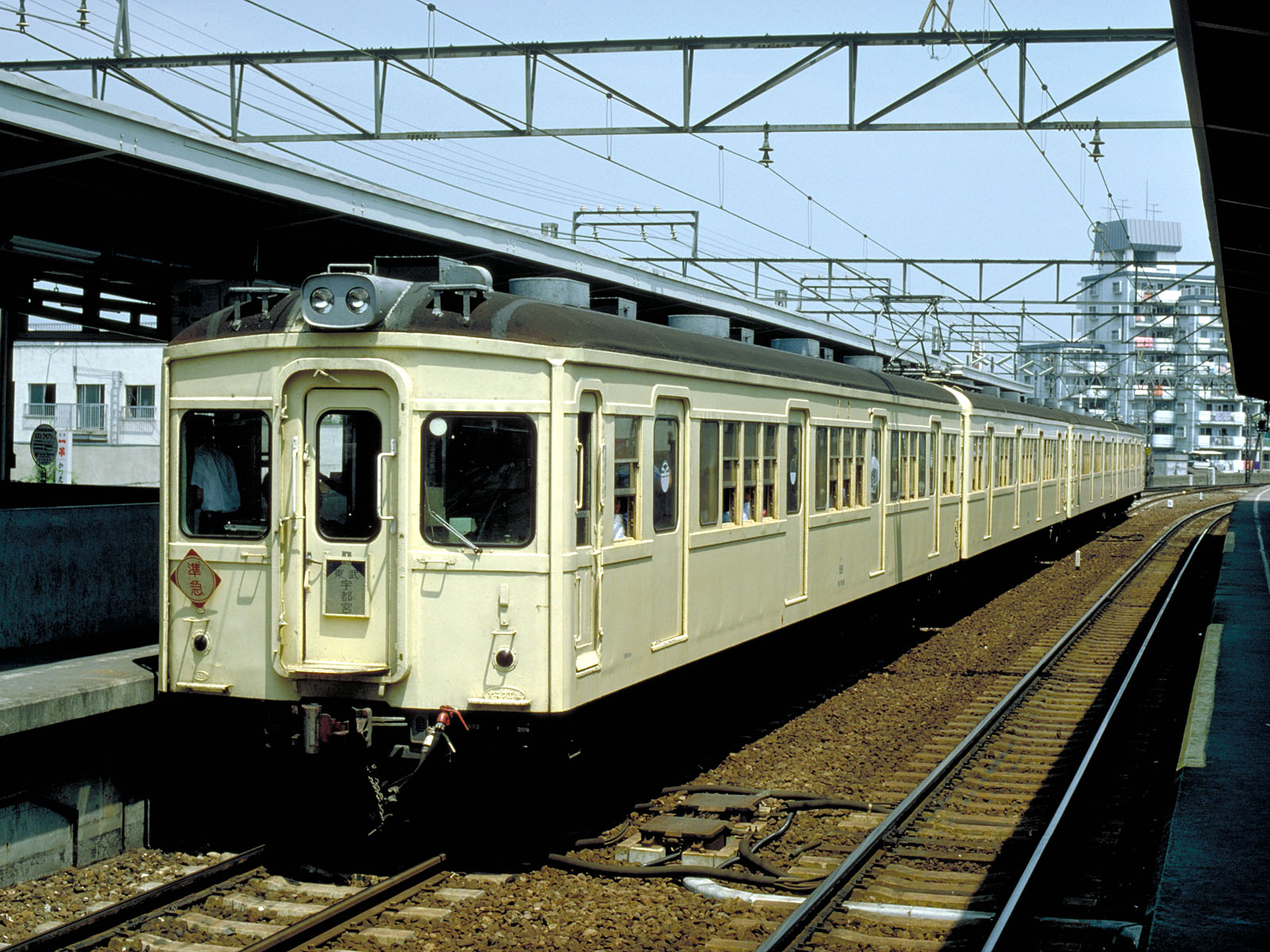
- A 7800 series on the Isesaki Line
- In service: 1953–1985
- Manufacturers: Hitachi, Kisha Seizo, Naniwa Koki, Nippon Sharyo, Tokyu Sharyo, Utsunomiya Sharyo
- Constructed: 1953–1961
- Number built: 164 vehicles
- Operator: Tobu Railway
- Lines served: Tobu Isesaki Line, Tobu Tojo Line, Tobu Ogose Line

Specifications
- Car body construction: Steel/wood
- Car length: 20 m (65 ft 7 in)
- Doors: 4 per side
- Electric system: 1,500 V DC, overhead catenary
- Multiple working: Tobu 7300 series
- Track gauge: 1,067 mm (3 ft 6 in)

The Tobu 7800 series (東武7800系, Tōbu 7800-kei) was a DC electric multiple unit (EMU) commuter train type operated by the private railway operator Tobu Railway in Japan.

A total of 164 7800 series vehicles were built between 1953 and 1961. With the exception of two vehicles withdrawn due to accident damage, all of the cars were ultimately rebuilt between 1978 and 1986 to become 5000 series sets.

== Withdrawals ==
Two cars, 7808 and 808, were withdrawn in December 1970 following accident damage. The remaining 162 cars were rebuilt between 1978 and 1986 with new steel bodies as 5000 series sets.
