= Tobu 5000 series =

Japanese train type

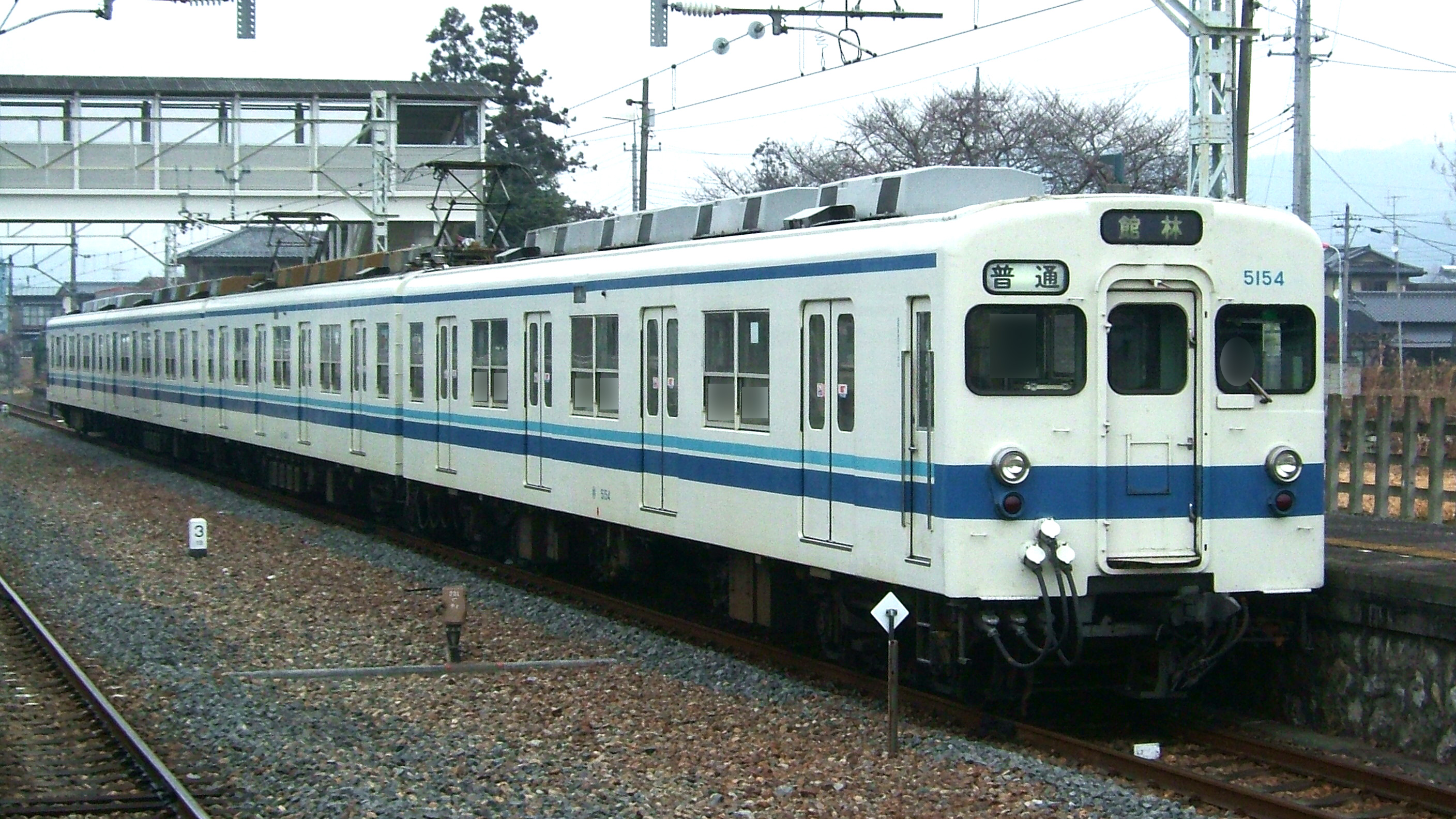
- 5050 series set 5154 in January 2006
- In service: 1979–2006
- Constructed: 1978–1986
- Number built: 162 vehicles
- Number in service: None
- Formation: 2/4/6 cars per trainset
- Operators: Tobu Railway
- Depots: Kasukabe, Shinrinkoen
- Lines served: Tobu Isesaki Line, Tobu Nikko Line, Tobu Noda Line, Tobu Ogose Line, Tobu Tojo Line, Tobu Utsunomiya Line

Specifications
- Car body construction: Steel
- Car length: 20 m (65 ft 7 in)
- Traction system: Resistor control
- Traction motors: HS-269; TDK-544
- Transmission: Cam shaft
- Electric system(s): 1,500 V DC, overhead catenary
- Track gauge: 1,067 mm (3 ft 6 in)

The Tobu 5000 series (東武5000系, Tōbu 5000-kei) was a DC electric multiple unit (EMU) commuter train type operated by the private railway operator Tobu Railway in Japan between 1979 and 2006.

The 5000 series was created between 1978 and 1986 by modernizing the entire fleet of 162 former 7800 series EMU cars, built between 1953 and 1961, by adding new steel bodies based on the 8000 series design. The fleet was subdivided into 5000, 5050, and 5070 series types.

== Variants ==
- 5000 series: 4-car 5000 series and 2-car 5500 series sets
- 5050 series: 4-car 5050 series and 2-car 5550 series sets
- 5070 series: 6-car sets

== 5000 series ==
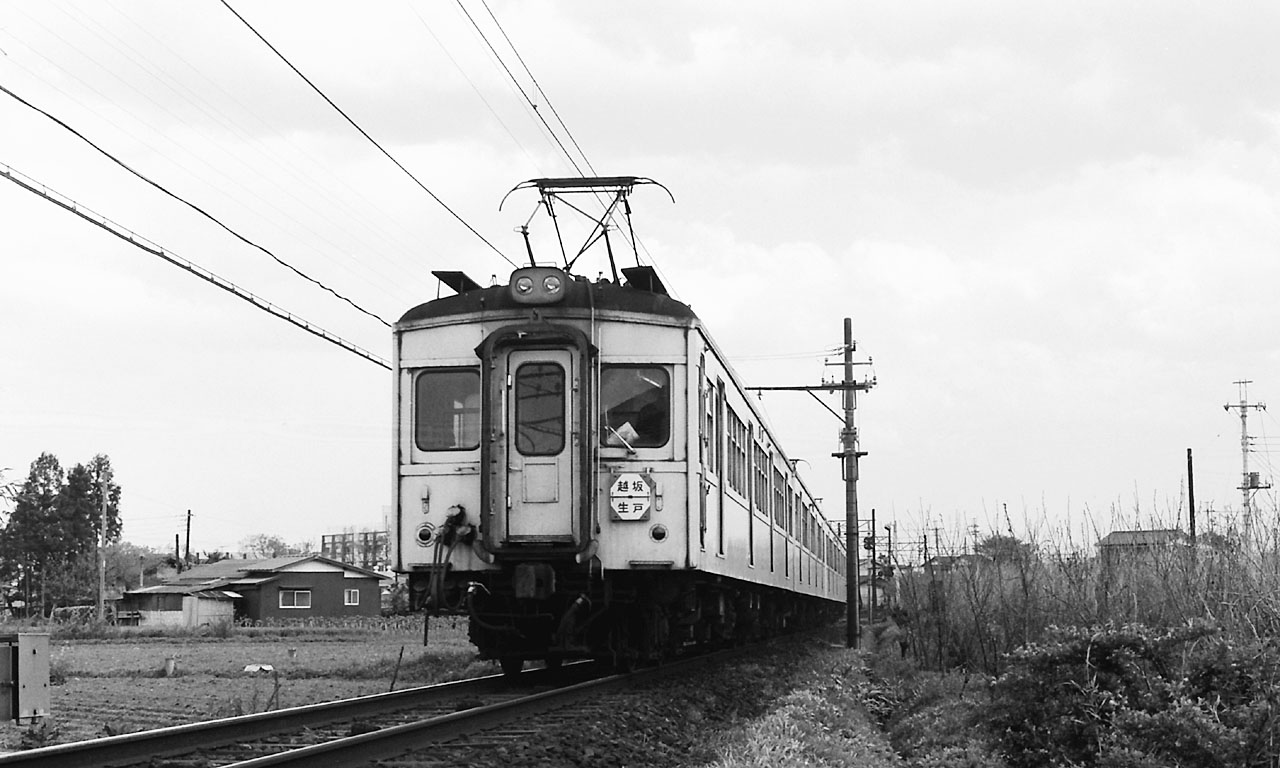
7800 series from which the 5000 series sets were converted

The first 12 former 7800 series cars were rebuilt between November 1978 and August 1979, reformed as two four-car 5000 series sets and two two-car 5500 series sets. These sets were initially not air-conditioned, and used the ventilators and motor generators removed from 8000 series sets that had been refurbished with air-conditioning. These four sets were also subsequently modified with air-conditioning between July 1984 and March 1985.

The 5000 series sets were all withdrawn by 2003.

=== Formations ===
The four-car 5000 series and two-car 5500 series sets operated on the Tobu Tojo Line, and were formed as follows with the 5100 and 5500 cars at the Ikebukuro end.

==== 4-car 5000 series ====
Designation	Mc	T	M	Tc
Numbering	5100	5200	5300	5400

The 5300 cars were fitted with two pantographs.

==== 2-car 5500 series ====
Designation	Mc	Tc
Numbering	5500	5600

The 5500 cars were fitted with one pantograph.

== 5050 series ==
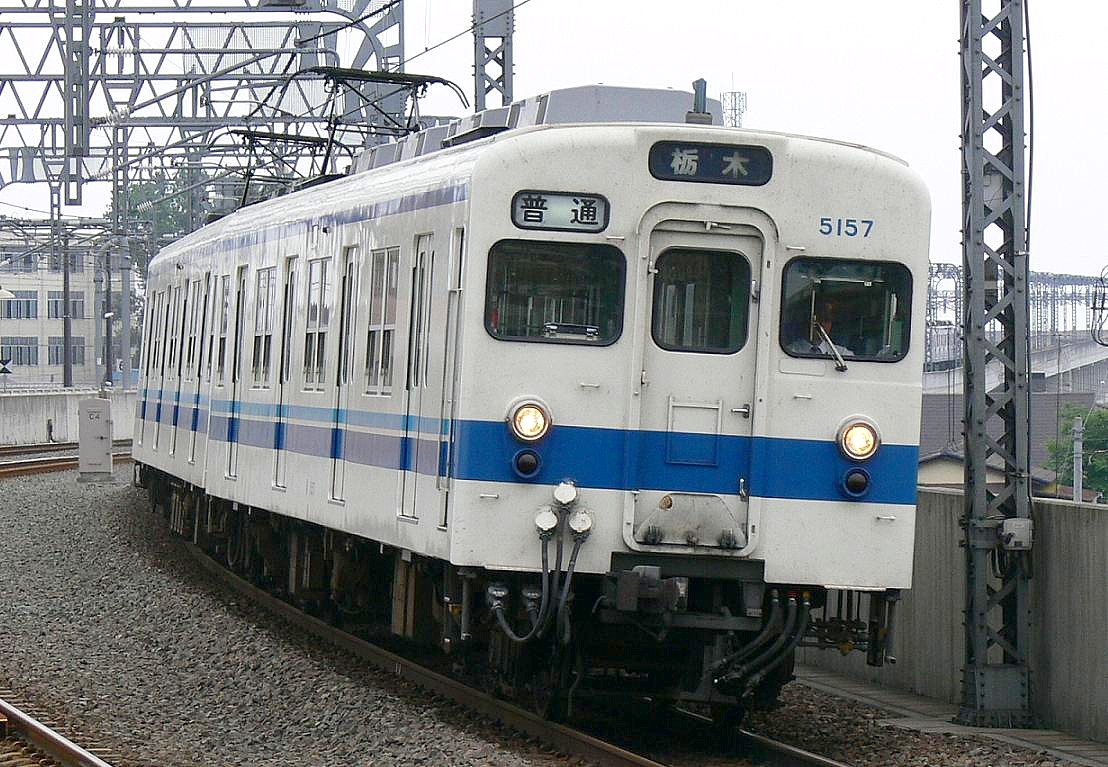
5050 series set 5157 in June 2006

Following on from the earlier 5000 series sets, a total of 72 7800 series cars were rebuilt between 1981 and March 1984 as two-car 5550 and four-car 5050 series sets. Unlike the earlier 5000 series sets, the 5050 series sets were air-conditioned.

The trains were removed from regular service in late 2006, with a sayonara final run on 16 December, and were entirely withdrawn by February 2007.

=== Formations ===
The four-car 5050 series were formed as follows.

==== 4-car 5050 series ====
Designation	Tc	M	M	Tc
Numbering	5150	5250	5350	5450

The 5250 cars were fitted with two pantographs.

==== 2-car 5550 series ====
Designation	Mc	Tc
Numbering	5550	5650

The 5550 cars were fitted with one pantograph.

== 5070 series ==
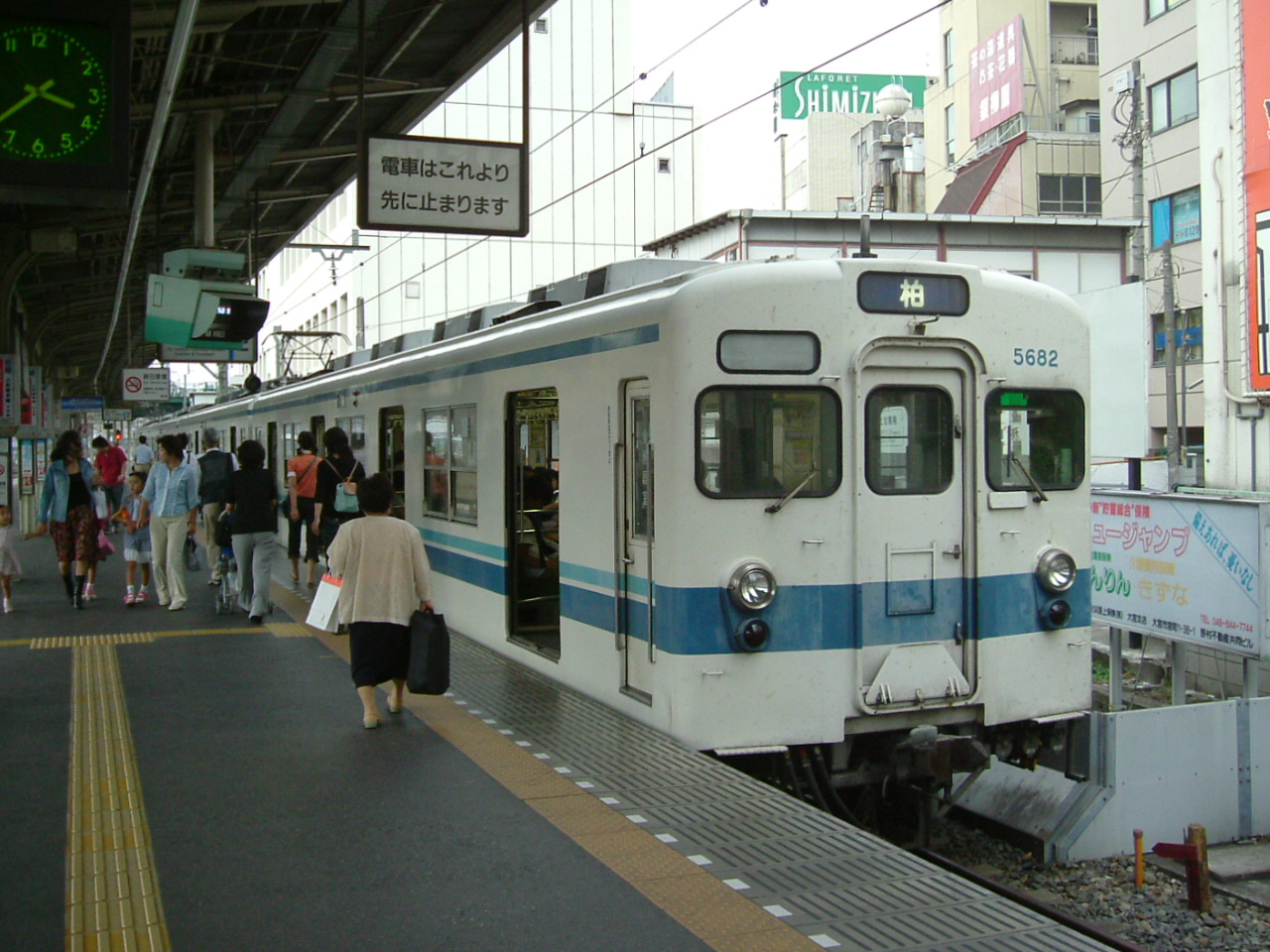
Noda Line 5070 series set 5182 in September 2004

13 six-car 5070 series sets (78 vehicles) were built between June 1984 and March 1986 by modernizing former 7800 series EMU cars with new 8000-series-style bodies and air conditioning. The fleet operated on the Noda Line, but were gradually replaced from 1997 by six-car 8000 series EMUs displaced by the arrival of new 30000 series EMUs on the Tobu Isesaki Line, with the entire fleet withdrawn from service by the start of the revised timetable on 19 October 2004.

=== Formations ===
The 6-car 5070 series sets were formed as follows.

Designation	Tc	M	M	T	M	Tc
Numbering	5170	5270	5370	5470	5570	5670

The 5270 cars were fitted with two pantographs, and the 5570 cars were fitted with one pantograph.

== Specifications ==
Tobu 5000 series trains had car bodies based on the Tobu 8000 series, each having a length of 20m. The traction motors were resistor controlled.
