= Tobu 7300 series =

Japanese train type

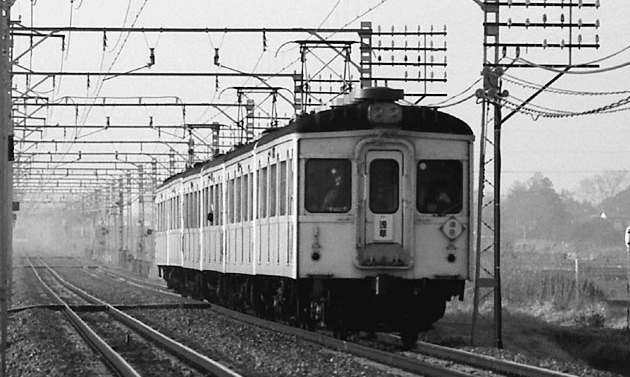
- A 7300 series on the Isesaki Line in 1977
- In service: 1959–1984
- Manufacturer: Nippon Sharyo, Tsuha Sharyo
- Constructed: 1944–1950 (as 63 series)
- Refurbished: 1959–1964
- Number built: 58 vehicles
- Number in service: None
- Number preserved: 1
- Operators: Tobu Railway
- Lines served: Tobu Isesaki Line, Tobu Tojo Line, Tobu Ogose Line

Specifications
- Car body construction: Steel
- Car length: 20 m (65 ft 7 in)
- Doors: 4 per side
- Electric system(s): 1,500 V DC, overhead catenary
- Multiple working: Tobu 7800 series
- Track gauge: 1,067 mm (3 ft 6 in)

The Tobu 7300 series (東武7300系, Tōbu 7300-kei) was a DC electric multiple unit (EMU) commuter train type operated by the private railway operator Tobu Railway in Japan.

The 7300 series sets were built between September 1959 and 1964 from 58 former 63 series EMU cars purchased from both JNR and Meitetsu, with new bodies based on the 7800 series design. The last remaining sets were withdrawn by September 1984.

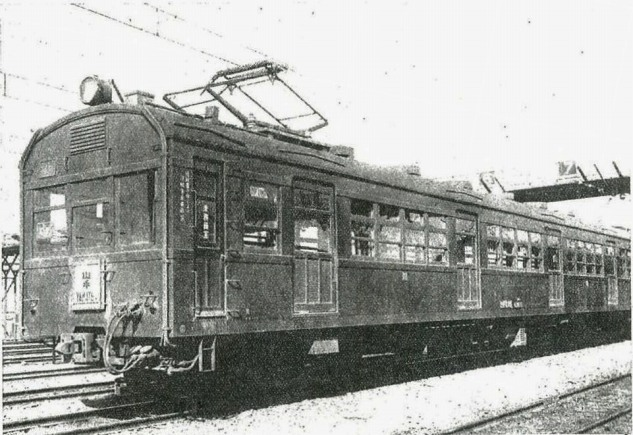
An original JNR 63 series EMU car

== Interior ==
Passenger accommodation consisted of longitudinal bench seating throughout.

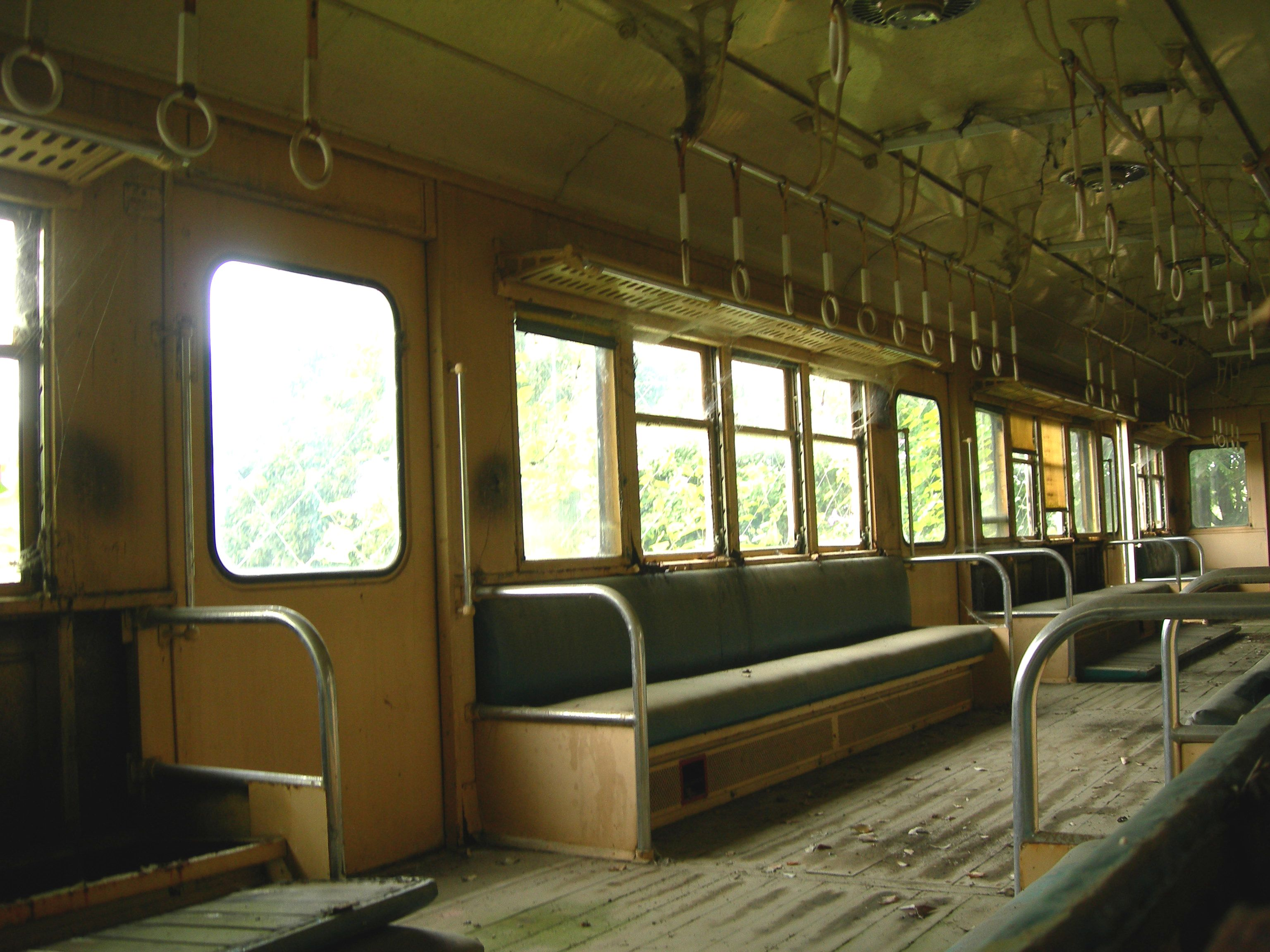
Interior of preserved MoHa 7329, September 2009

== Preserved examples ==
One car, MoHa 7329, is preserved at the Tobu Dobutsu-koen amusement park.

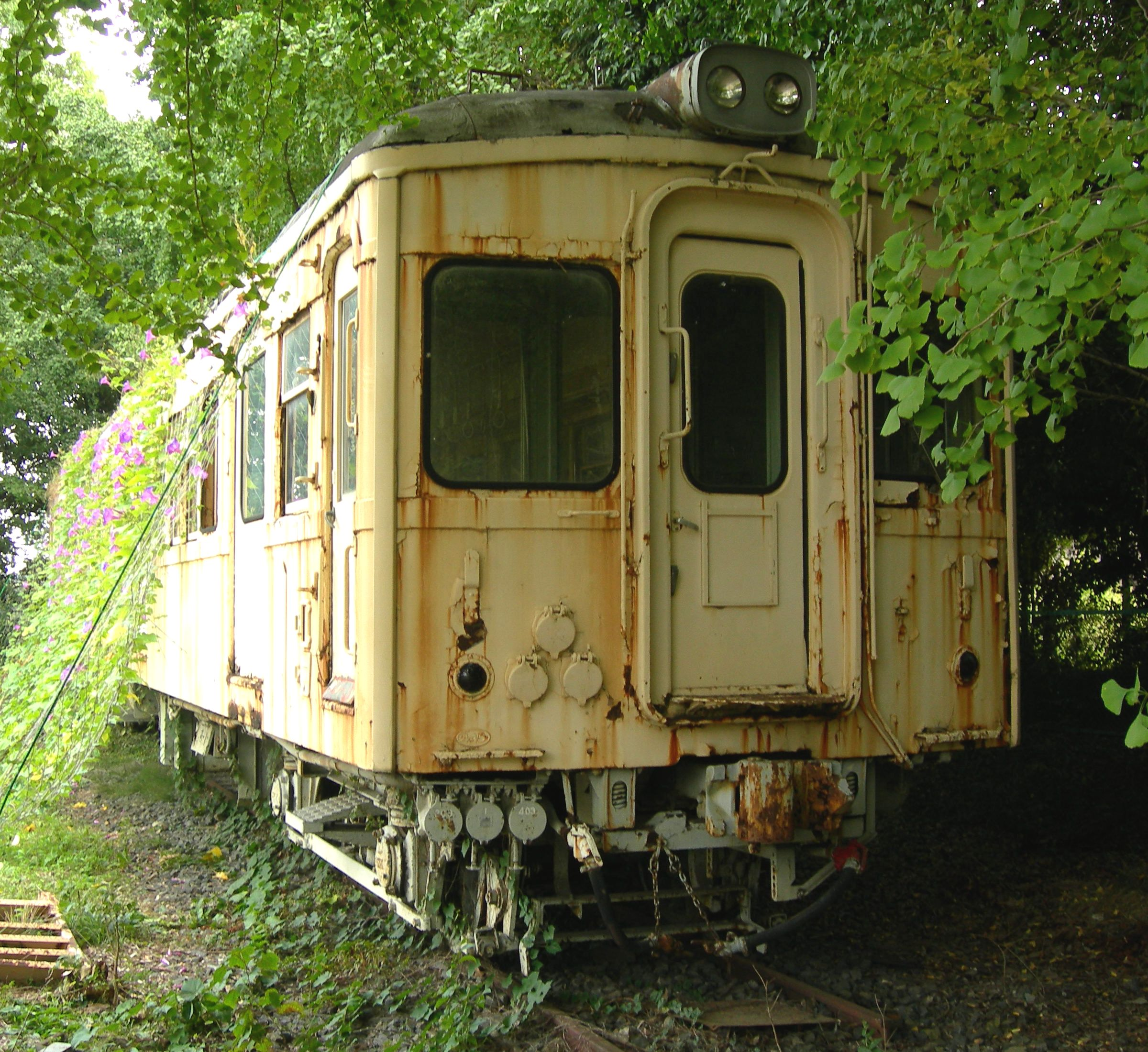
Preserved MoHa 7329, September 2009
