= Konda Kanga ruins =

Archaeological site in Japan

- 金田官衙遺跡 (Japanese)
- Konda Kanga ruins Konda Kanga ruins (Japan)
- 36°06′02″N 140°07′56″E
- Periods: Nara - Heian period
- Location: Tsukuba, Ibaraki, Japan
- Region: Kantō region

History
- Built: 8th-9th century AD

Site notes
- Elevation: 27 m (89 ft)
- Area: 95,872.98 m^{2} (1,031,968.2 sq ft)
- Public access: No

The Konda Kanga ruins (金田官衙遺跡, Konda kanga iseki) is an archaeological site with the ruins of a Nara to Heian period government administrative complex located in what is now the Kaneda and Higashioka neighborhoods of the city of Tsukuba in Ibaraki prefecture in the northern Kantō region of Japan. The site has been protected as a National Historic Site from 2004.

== Overview ==
In the late Nara period, after the establishment of a centralized government under the Ritsuryō system, local rule over the provinces was standardized under a kokufu (provincial capital), and each province was divided into smaller administrative districts, known as (郡, gun, kōri), composed of 2–20 townships in 715 AD. Each of the units had an administrative complex, or kanga (官衙遺跡) built on a semi-standardized layout based on contemporary Chinese design.

The Konda Kanga ruins are located on the edge of a plateau, approximately 15 kilometers south of Mount Tsukuba, overlooking the east side of the alluvial lowland in the Sakuragawa basin that extends from the foot of Mount Tsukuba towards Lake Kasumigaura. The ruins were discovered during expansion work on the schoolyard of Sakura Junior High School in 1959. The traces of several pillared building foundations along with a large amount of carbonized rice was found. Per an archaeological excavation in 1984, the platforms for the central building and a large quantity of roof tiles were uncovered. Further excavations were conducted in 1999 and 2002, which confirmed the layout to be that of a local administrative center, presumably that of ancient Kawachi-gun in Hitachi Province.

The ruins consist of three separate areas:

- Shōsōin (Konda Nishitsubo B ruins) - The foundations of a large number of raised floor granaries for storing tax rice, located within an enclosure measuring 110 meter east–west, by 310 meters north–south, surrounded by a moat with a three-meter width and a 1.3 meter depth. The schoolyard where ruins and carbonized rice were discovered in 1959 is the northern half of this complex.
- Kanga (Konda Nishi ruins) - Over 100 pillar foundations for at least four of buildings, arranged in a "L" shape, along with the remnants of a well and fence lines
- Kuju Higashioka temple ruins - The foundations of a Buddhist temple, from which a large number of roof tiles were found. A Buddhist temple located outside the main enclosure was part of the standardized layout of a county-level administrative complex.

It appears that the site was occupied from the eighth through the end of the ninth centuries. It is uncertain when the complex was abandoned. The site was backfilled after excavation, and is now an empty field located about 15 minutes by car from Tsukuba Station on the Tsukuba Express. The Hirasawa Kanga ruins are located 9 kilometers to the northwest.

== See also ==
- List of Historic Sites of Japan (Ibaraki)
