= Midorino Station =

Railway station in Tsukuba, Ibaraki Prefecture, Japan

Midorino Station みどりの駅
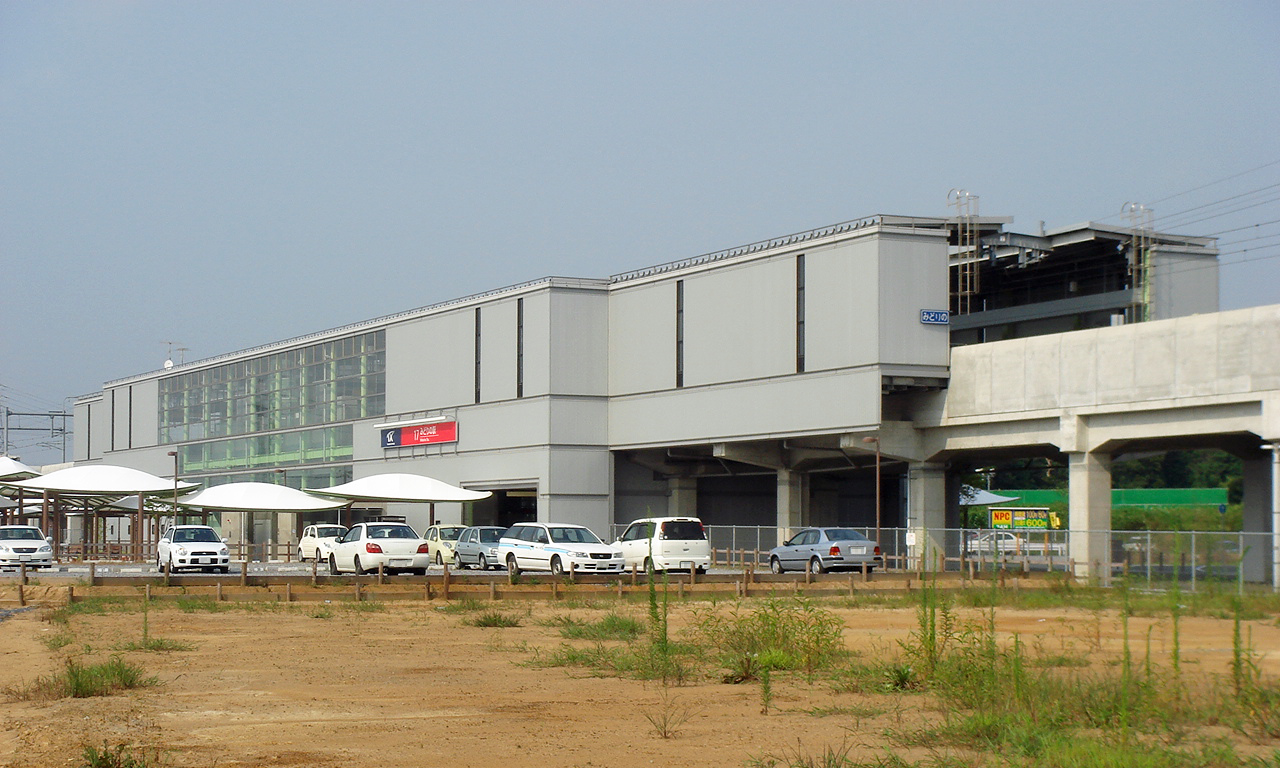
- Midorino Station, August 2006

General information
- Location: Shimokayamaru 382, Tsukuba-shi, Ibaraki-ken 305-0872; Japan
- Coordinates: 36°01′48″N 140°03′22″E
- Operator: Metropolitan Intercity Railway Company
- Line: Tsukuba Express
- Distance: 48.6 km from Akihabara
- Platforms: 2 (2 side platforms)
- Tracks: 2

Construction
- Structure type: Elevated
- Accessible: Yes

Other information
- Status: Staffed
- Station code: TX17
- Website: Official website

History
- Opened: 24 August 2005

Passengers
- FY2019: 4846 daily

Services
Preceding station	Tsukuba Express	Following station
Miraidaira (TX16) towards Akihabara	Tsukuba Express Semi-Rapid Local	Bampaku-kinenkōen (TX18) towards Tsukuba
Location
- Location within Ibaraki Prefecture Location within Japan

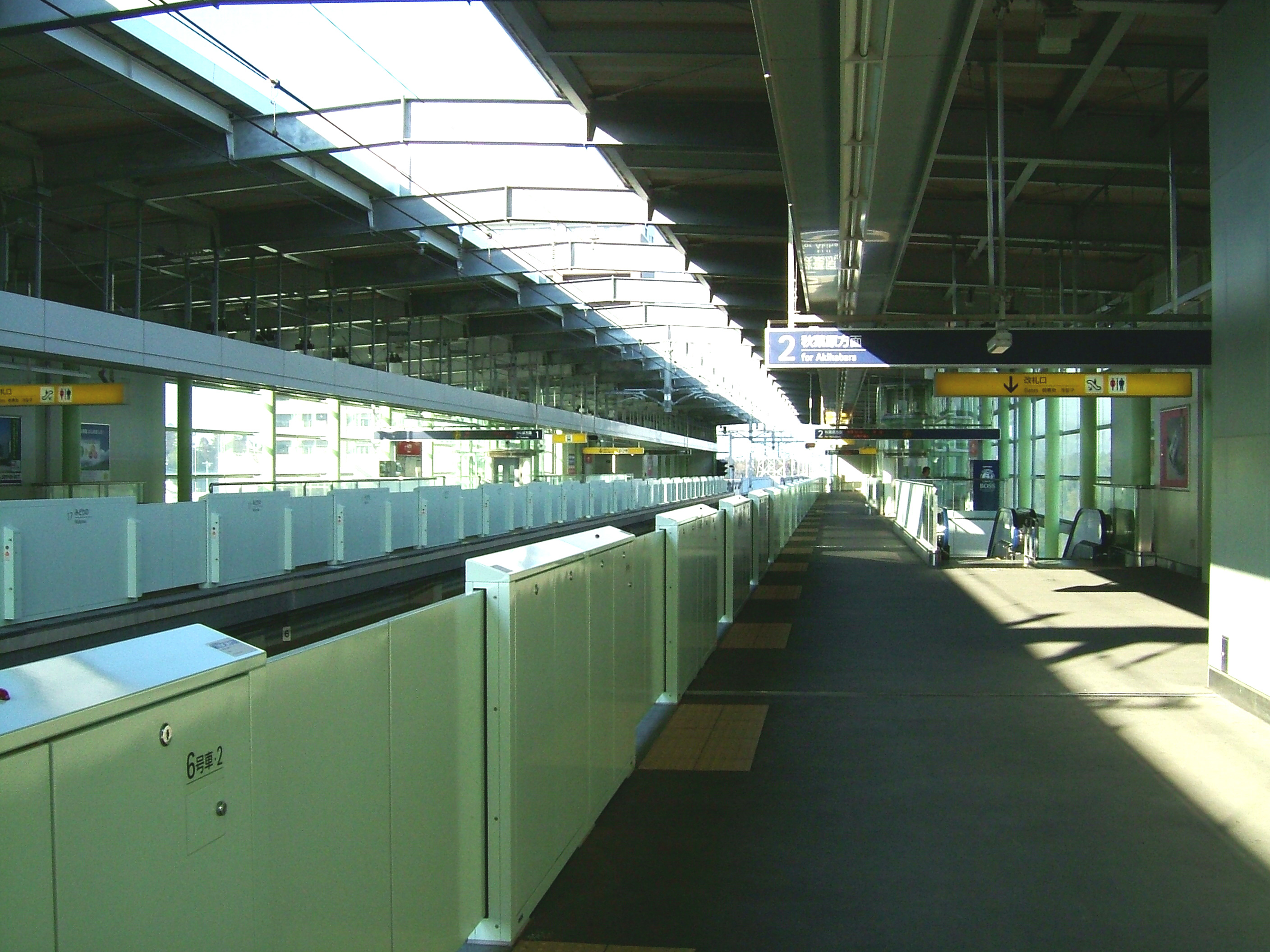
Platform view of Midorino Station

Midorino Station (みどりの駅, Midorino-eki) is a passenger railway station in the city of Tsukuba, Ibaraki Prefecture, Japan, operated by the third-sector railway operating company Metropolitan Intercity Railway Company. Its station number is TX17.

== Line ==
Midorino Station is served by the Tsukuba Express and is located 48.6 km (30.2 mi) from the official starting point of the line at Akihabara Station.

== Station layout ==
The station consists of two opposed side platforms on a viaduct, with the station building located underneath.

=== Platforms ===
1	Tsukuba Express	for Tsukuba
2	Tsukuba Express	for Minami-Nagareyama, Kita-Senju, and Akihabara

== History ==
Midorino Station opened on 24 August 2005.

== Passenger statistics ==
In fiscal 2019, the station was used by an average of 4846 passengers daily (boarding passengers only).

== Surrounding area ==
- National Agriculture and Food Research Organization
- National Agricultural Research Center
- National Food Research Institute
- Agriculture, Forestry and Fisheries Research Council
- National Institute for Agro-Environmental Sciences

== See also ==
- List of railway stations in Japan
