= Tsukuba International School =

Coordinates: 36.07654°N 140.022984°E

- Kamigo 7846-1, Tsukuba, Ibaraki, 300-2645; Japan

Information
- Type: Private
- Established: 1992
- Principal: Shaney Crawford
- Staff: 34 full time staff and 10 part time staff
- Grades: Pre-Kindergarten (age 3) - 12th grade
- Colors: Blue and green
- Affiliation: Japan Council of Independent Schools (JCIS)
- Website: http://www.tis.ac.jp

Tsukuba International School (つくばインターナショナルスクール, TIS) is a private, non-profit school for English-speaking children in Tsukuba, Ibaraki, Japan. It was established by the foreign community in 1992 in response to the need for an English education option for foreign students in the area. The school currently includes a preschool, elementary school, middle school, and high school (pre-kindergarten to Grade 12). As of September 2017, the school had 235 students in 14 grades, with 32 full-time staff and 7 part-time staff.

Tsukuba International School is a member of the Japan Council of International Schools (since 1998) and is recognized as an incorporated school (学校法人) by the Ibaraki Prefecture government. In November 2011, it received authorization to offer the Primary Years Programme (PYP) of the International Baccalaureate (IB). In June 2014, it received authorization to offer the Middle Years Programme (MYP). In April 2017, it received authorization to offer the Diploma Programme (DP). It was the twelfth school in Japan to offer the IB PYP, the ninth to offer the IB MYP, the 32nd to offer the IB DP, the sixth to offer the full PYP/MYP/DP continuum, and the 22nd IB World School in the country.

The school is located in the Kamigo region of Tsukuba Science City and the closest stations are Banpaku Kinen Koen on the Tsukuba Express Line and Mitsuma on the Joso Line.

== Notable alumni ==
- Lee Chae-rin, the leader of 2NE1, a Korean pop (K-pop) group, attended TIS when she was in elementary school.
- Warner Dearns, a Japanese rugby union player born in New Zealand, attended TIS when he was in junior high school.
