= Science Museum of Map and Survey =

- 地図と測量の科学館
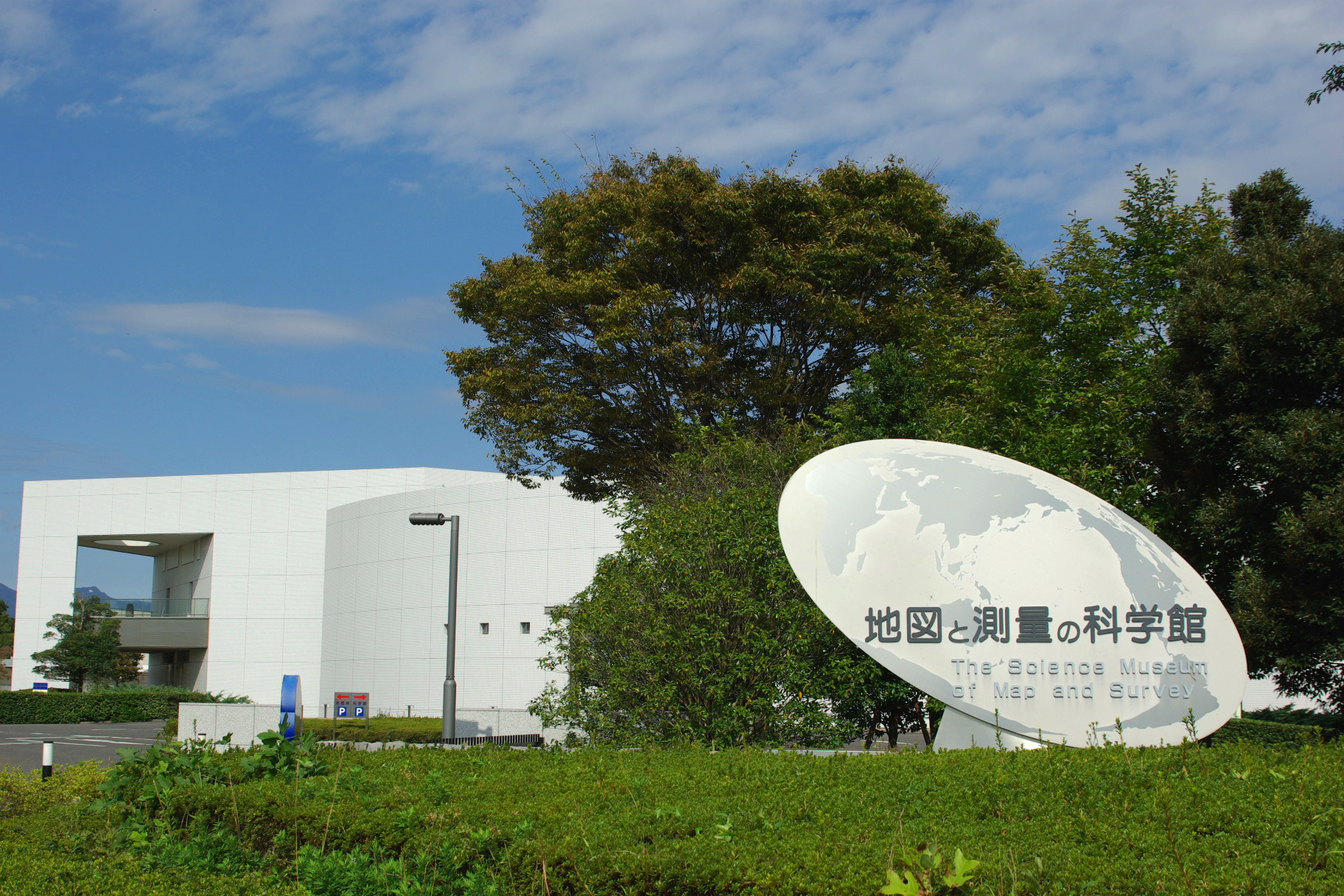
- Established: 1 June 1996
- Location: Kitagō 1-ban, Tsukuba, Ibaraki Prefecture, Japan 〒310-0811
- Coordinates: 36°06′14″N 140°05′08″E
- Type: science
- Accreditation: The Geospatial Information Authority of Japan
- Visitors: 40,338 (FY2004)
- Owner: Geographical Survey Institute of Japan
- Public transit access: Tsukuba
- Website: www.gsi.go.jp/MUSEUM/
- Building details

Technical details
- Floor area: 5,464 m^{2}

Design and construction
- Architect: Toda Corporation

The Science Museum of Map and Survey (地図と測量の科学館, Chizu to Sokuryō no Kagakukan) is a museum in Tsukuba, Ibaraki, Japan that is dedicated to mapping and surveying.

The museum was the first of its kind in Japan when it was opened by the Geographical Survey Institute of Japan in June 1996.
