= Bampaku-kinenkōen Station =

Railway station in Tsukuba, Ibaraki Prefecture, Japan

Bampaku-kinenkōen Station 万博記念公園駅
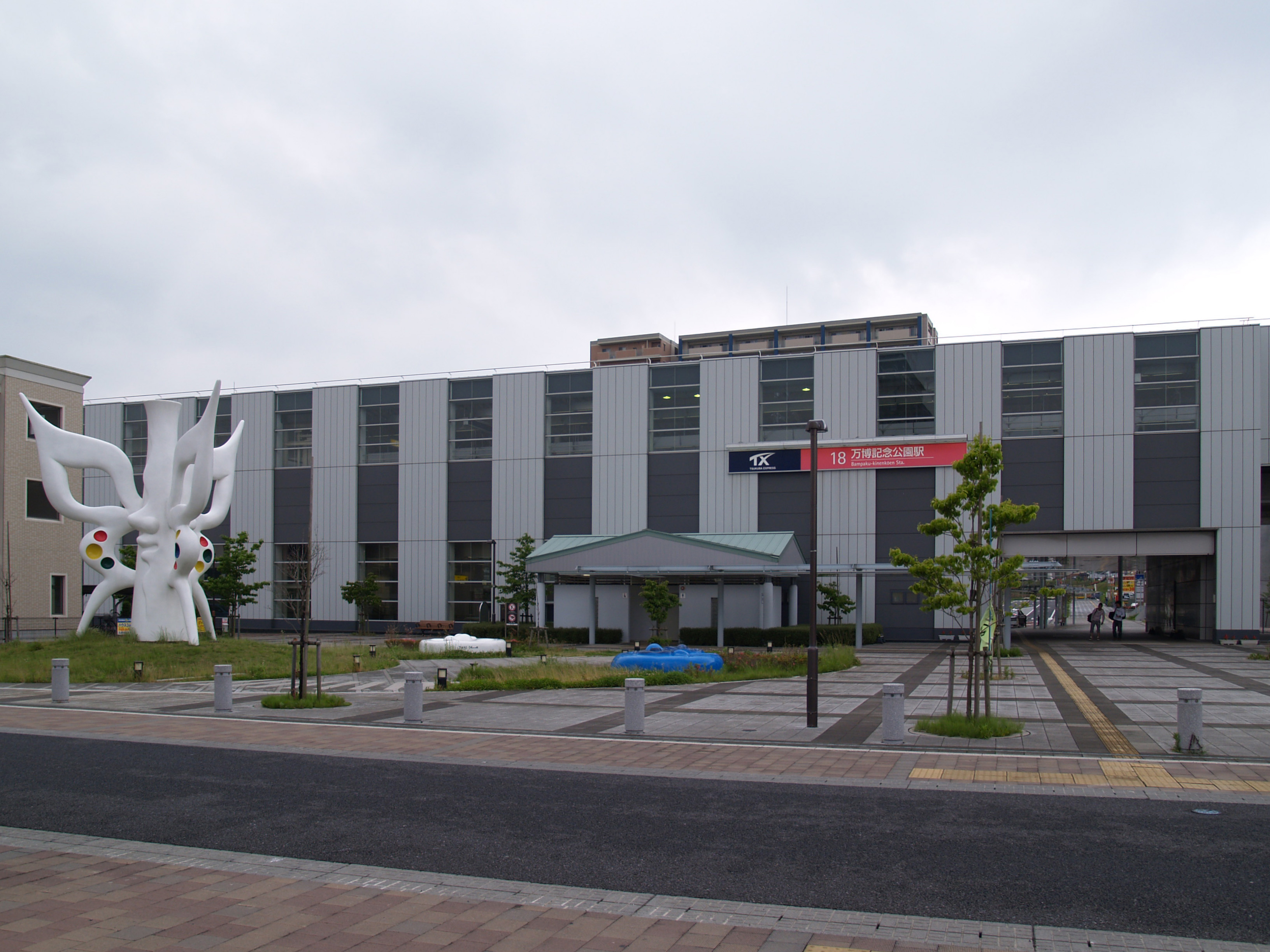
- The east side of Bampaku-kinenkōen Station in June 2010

General information
- Location: 4386 Shimana, Tsukuba-shi, Ibaraki-ken 300-2655; Japan
- Coordinates: 36°03′30″N 140°03′34″E
- Operator: Metropolitan Intercity Railway Company
- Line: Tsukuba Express
- Distance: 51.8 km from Akihabara
- Platforms: 2 (2 side platforms)
- Tracks: 2

Construction
- Structure type: Elevated
- Accessible: Yes

Other information
- Station code: TX18
- Website: Official website

History
- Opened: 24 August 2005

Passengers
- FY2019: 3314 daily

Services
Preceding station	Tsukuba Express	Following station
Midorino (TX17) towards Akihabara	Tsukuba Express Semi-Rapid Local	Kenkyū-gakuen (TX19) towards Tsukuba
Location
- Location within Ibaraki Prefecture Location within Japan

Bampaku-kinenkōen Station (万博記念公園駅, Bampaku-kinenkōen-eki) is a passenger railway station in the city of Tsukuba, Ibaraki Prefecture, Japan, operated by the Metropolitan Intercity Railway Company. Its station number is TX18. "Bampaku-kinenkōen" literally means "Expo Memorial Park" and is named after a nearby park built on the site of where Expo '85 was held.

== Lines ==
Bampaku-kinenkōen Station is served by the Tsukuba Express, and is located 51.8 km (32.2 mi) from the starting point of the line at Akihabara Station in Tokyo.

== Station layout ==
The station consists of two opposed side platforms on a viaduct, with the station building located underneath.

=== Platforms ===
1	■ Tsukuba Express	for Tsukuba
2	■ Tsukuba Express	for Akihabara

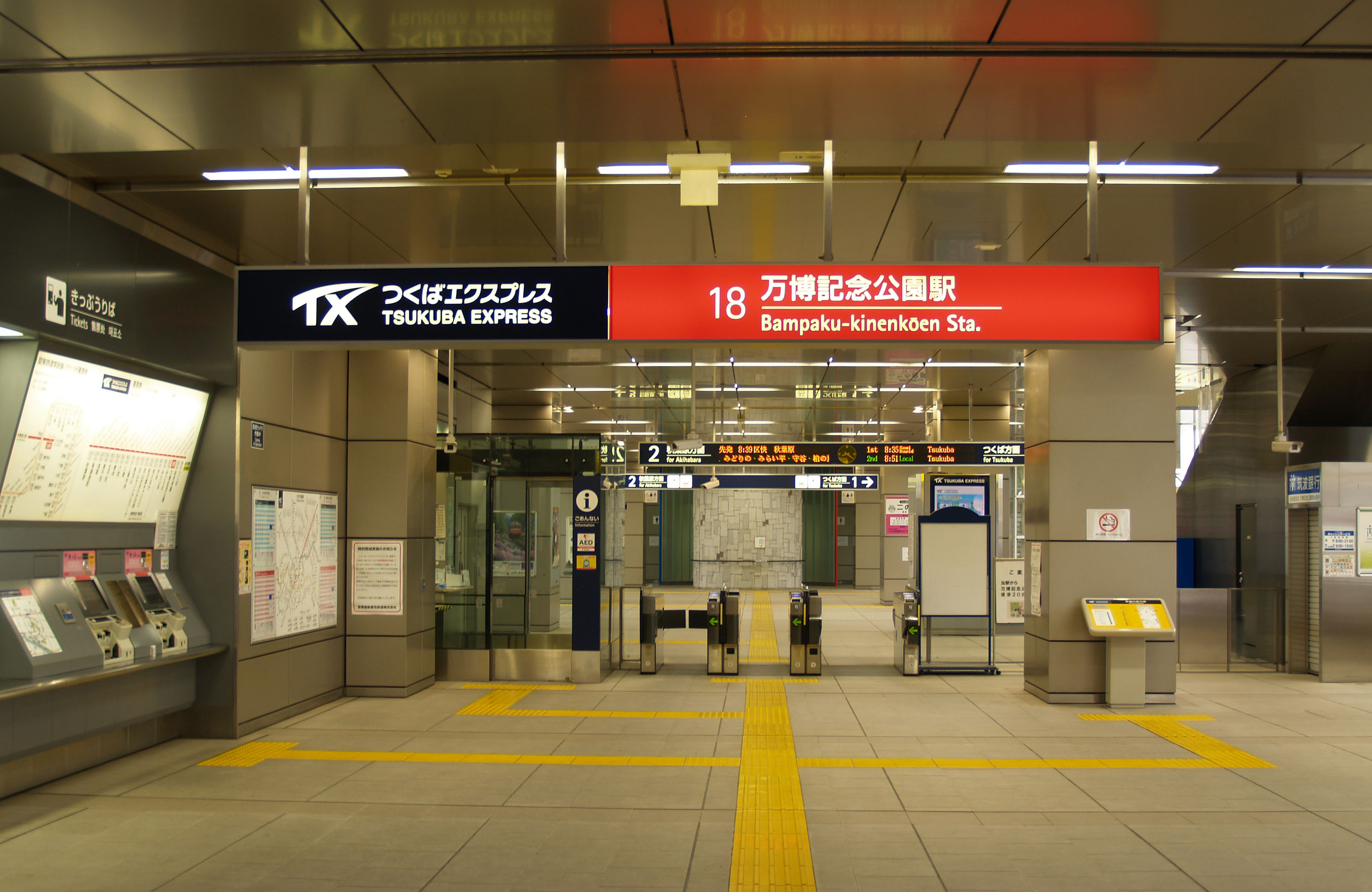
Ticket gates

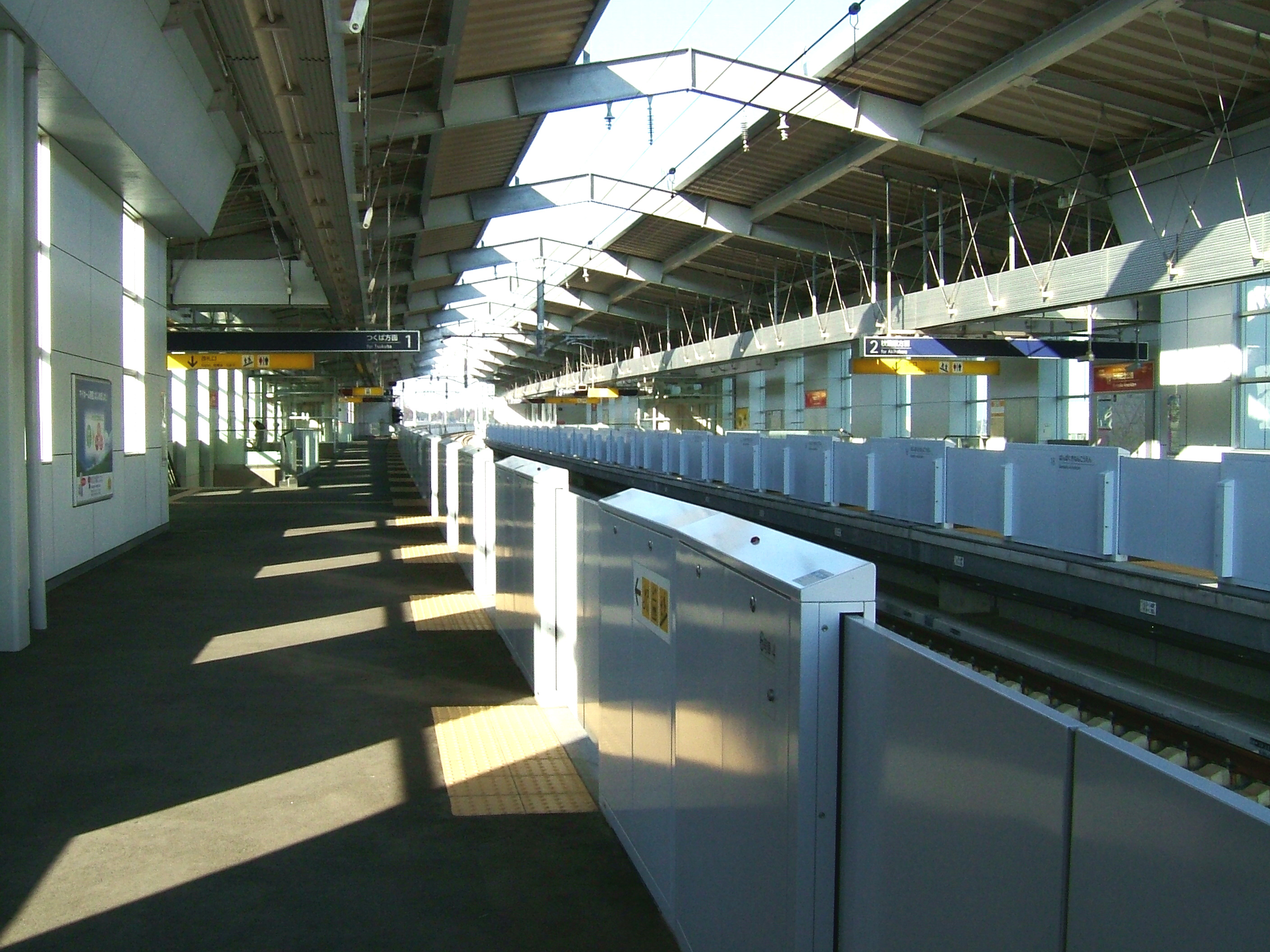
Platforms

== History ==
Bampaku-kinenkōen Station opened on 24 August 2005.

== Passenger statistics ==
In fiscal 2019, the station was used by an average of 3314 passengers daily (boarding passengers only).

== Surrounding area ==
- Site of Expo '85

== See also ==
- List of railway stations in Japan
