= Hirasawa Kanga ruins =

Archaeological site in Tsukuba, Ibaraki, Japan

Coordinates: 36°10′41″N 140°06′12″E

- 平沢官衙遺跡 (Japanese)
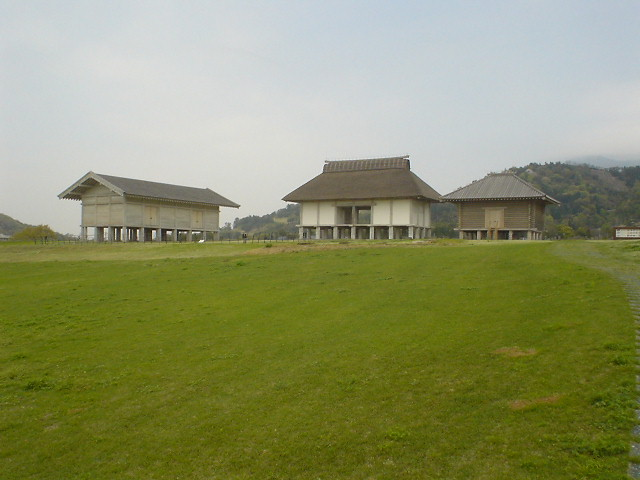
- Hirasawa Kanga ruins

- Hirasawa Kanga ruins Hirasawa Kanga ruins (Japan)
- Periods: Nara - Heian period
- Location: Tsukuba, Ibaraki, Japan
- Region: Kantō region

History
- Built: 8th century AD

Site notes
- Elevation: 27 m (89 ft)
- Public access: No

The Hirasawa Kanga ruins (平沢官衙遺跡, Hirasawa kanga iseki) is an archaeological site with the ruins of a Nara to Heian period government administrative complex located in what is now part of the city of Tsukuba in Ibaraki prefecture in the northern Kantō region of Japan. The site has been protected as a National Historic Site from 1980.

== Overview ==
In the late Nara period, after the establishment of a centralized government under the Ritsuryō system, local rule over the provinces was standardized under a kokufu (provincial capital), and each province was divided into smaller administrative districts, known as (郡, gun, kōri), composed of 2–20 townships in 715 AD. Each of the units had an administrative complex built on a semi-standardized layout based on contemporary Chinese design.

According to the Nara period Hitachikoku Fudoki, the land around Mount Tsukuba was a country ruled by the agata of Tsukuba, also known as the Tsukuba kuni no miyatsuko who had his capital to the south of the mountain. The Hirasawa site approximately corresponds to this location.

The site was discovered in 1975 during preliminary construction for a housing complex. It was excavated by the Ibaraki Prefecture Board of Education from 1973 to 1975 for the purpose of collecting materials for the restoration and development of a historical park from 1993 to 1994. During these excavations, the foundations for 55 buried pillar buildings, four foundation pillar buildings, and traces of moat, palisade and some 25 pit dwellings were discovered. The layout of the buildings in a "U" shape corresponds to that of the standardized administrative center format. Most of the buildings are believed to have been raised floor granaries for the purpose of storing taxation rice, and were arranged orderly in two groups. Aside from the Haji ware pottery from the site of the pit dwellings, a small amount of earthenware and Sue ware were found, as well as roof tile fragments. Carbonized rice was excavated from some of the pillar holes, indicating that the site was destroyed by fire, but the quantity of earthenware and roof tile fragments was relatively few. The pit dwellings were found to date from the late Jōmon period, indicating that a settlement had existed on this site from long before the expanding Yamato state had decided to make this site a regional administrative center.

The ruins were opened to the public in 2003, and one of the high-floor warehouses has been restored in full size, along with a 160-meter section of the moat and palisade to the north and 110 metres (360 ft) to the west. The moat had a trapezoidal cross-section, with a maximum width of 4 m (13 ft), lowest width of 1.8 m (5 ft 11 in) and depth of 1.2 m (3 ft 11 in). The restored warehouse is mentioned in ancient literature, and its restoration was based on the design of a similar structure at the ancient temple of Horyu-ji in Ikaruga, Nara, with earthen walls. The roof on the restoration is thatch, as the quantity of roof tile fragments recovered from the ruins of the foundation would not be enough to justify a tile roof design. The site is located a 30-minute walk from the "kyū Tsukuba chōsha" bus stop on the Tsukuba Bus from Tsukuba Station.

== Gallery ==
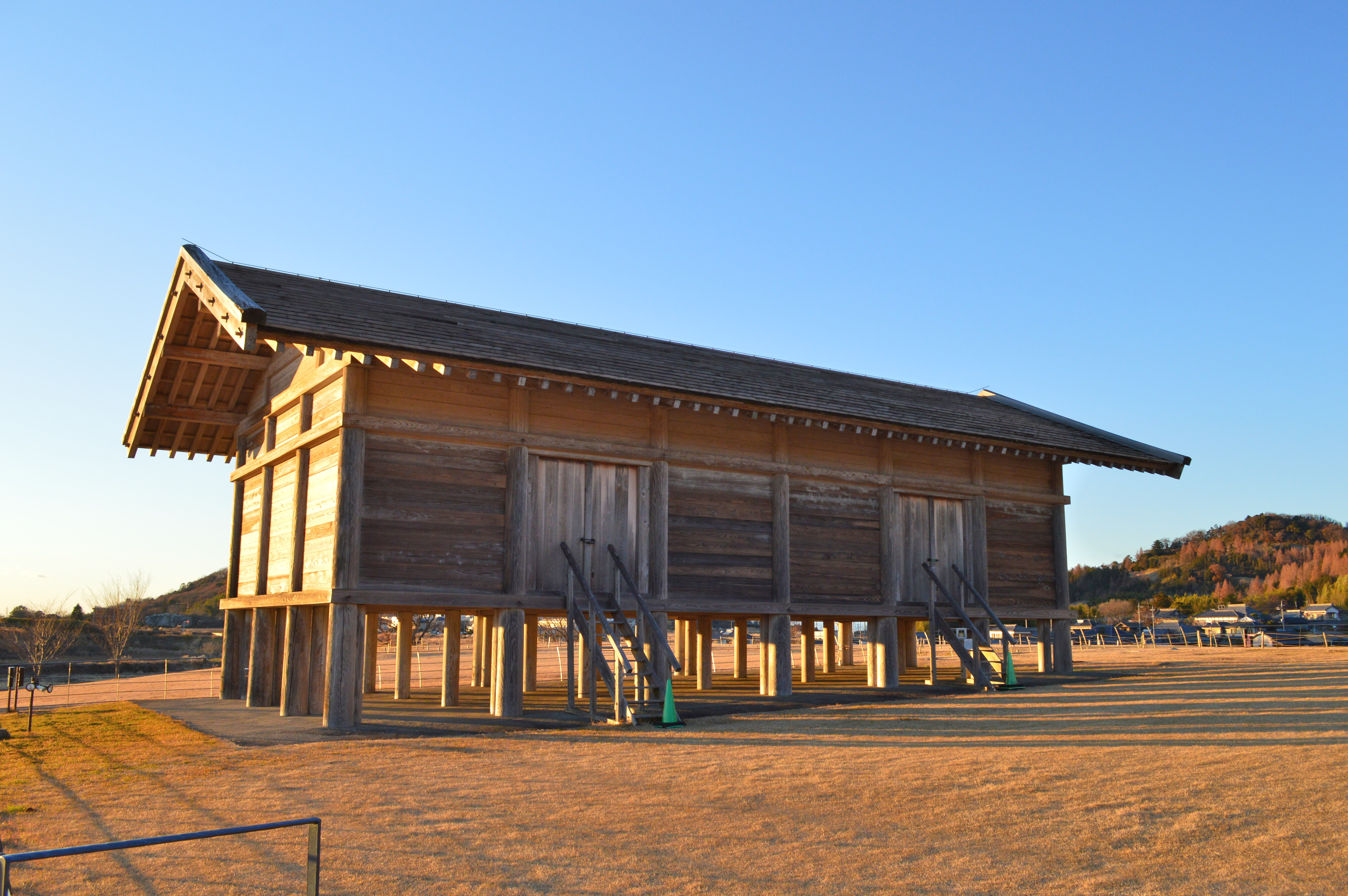
Reconstructed raised-floor warehouse

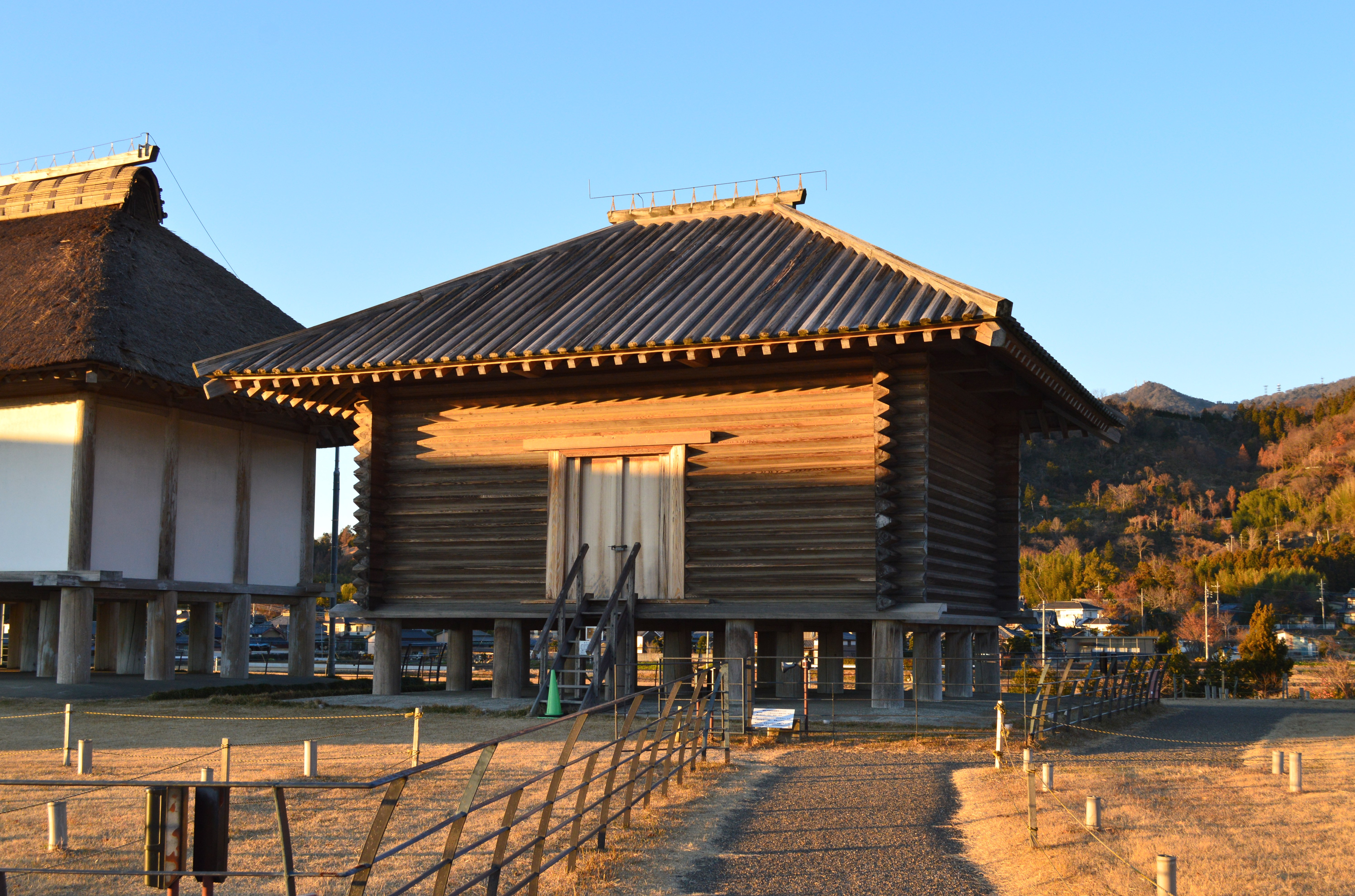
Reconstructed "Azekura"-style warehouse

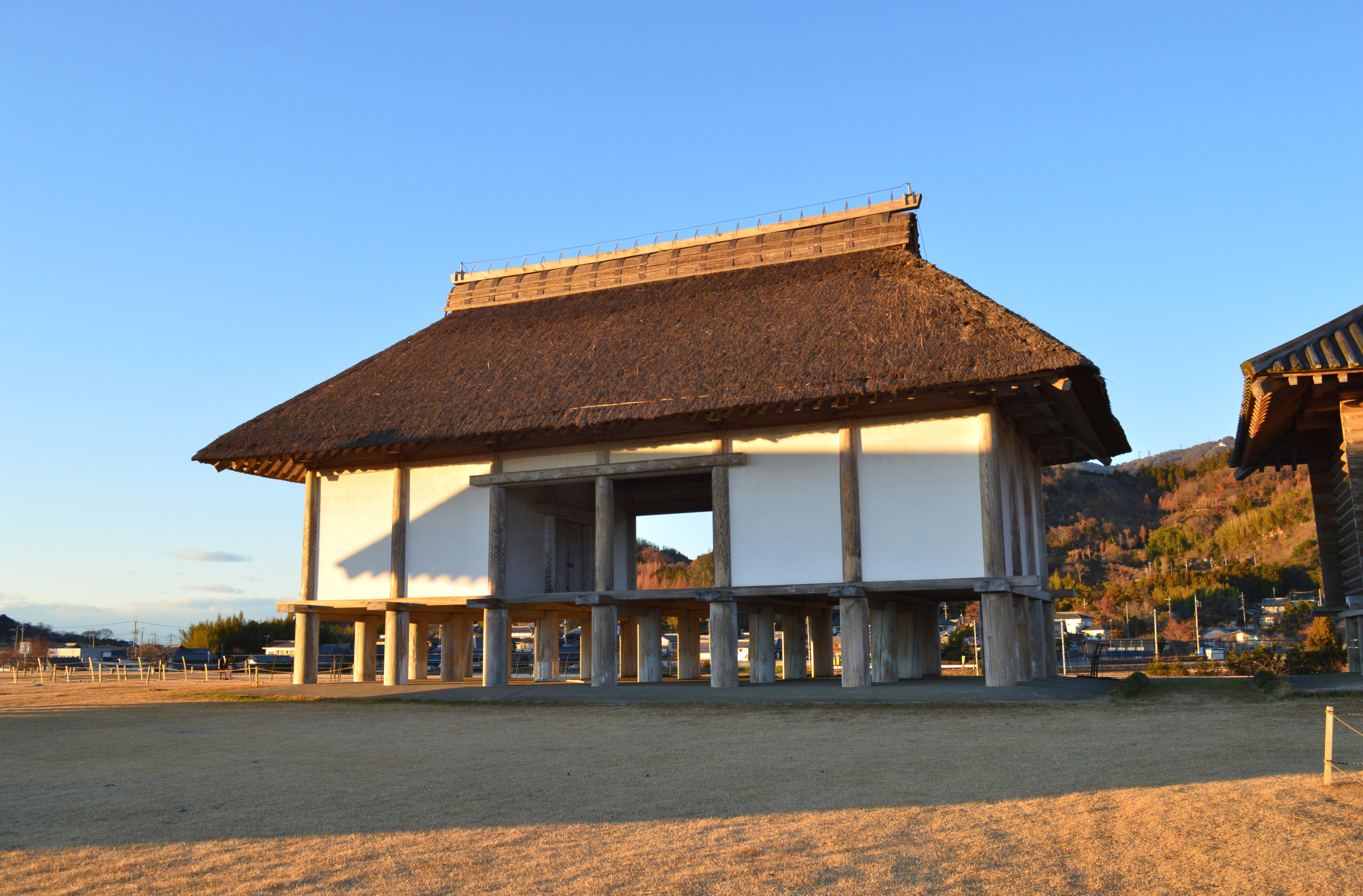
reconstructed raised-floor building

== See also ==
- List of Historic Sites of Japan (Ibaraki)
