= Kenkyū-gakuen Station =

Railway station in Tsukuba, Ibaraki Prefecture, Japan

Kenkyū-gakuen Station 研究学園駅
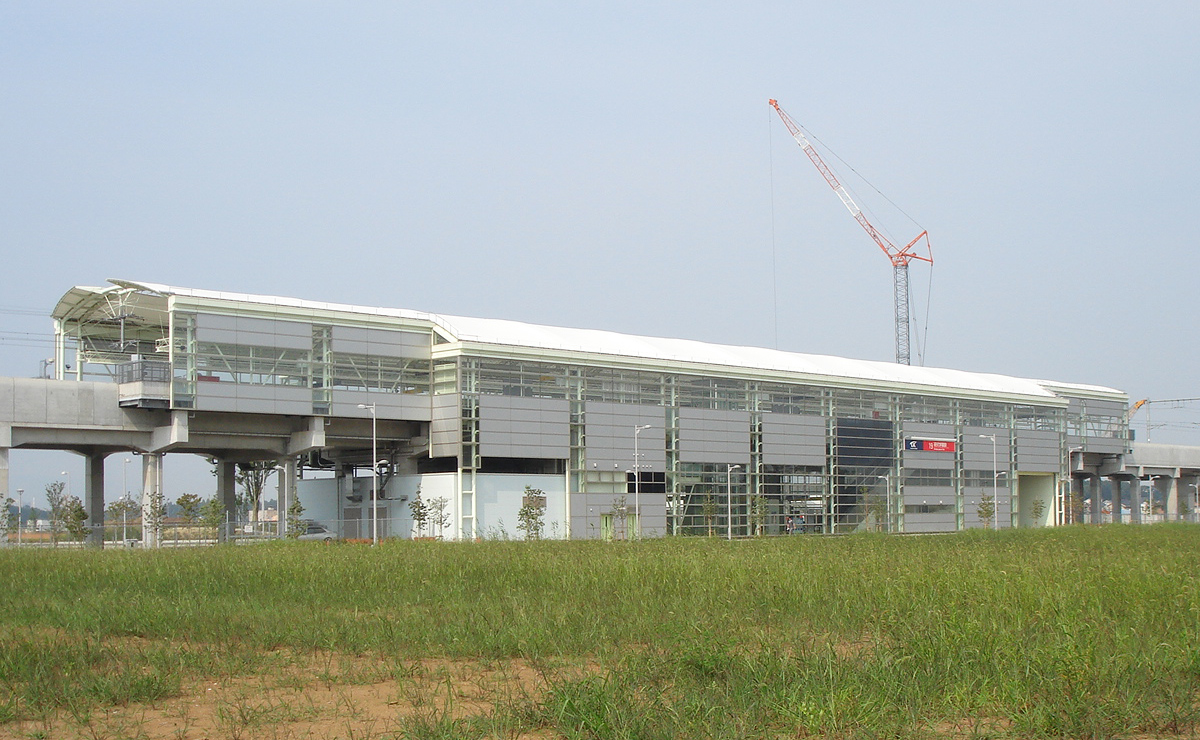
- Kenkyū-gakuen Station in 2006

General information
- Location: Kenkyū-gakuen 5-9-1, Tsukuba-shi, Ibaraki-ken 305-0817; Japan
- Coordinates: 36°4′55.69″N 140°4′56.66″E
- Operator: Metropolitan Intercity Railway Company
- Line: Tsukuba Express
- Distance: 55.6 km from Akihabara
- Platforms: 2 (2 side platforms)
- Tracks: 2

Construction
- Structure type: Elevated
- Accessible: Yes

Other information
- Status: Staffed
- Station code: TX19
- Website: Official website

History
- Opened: 24 August 2005

Passengers
- FY2019: 7367 daily

Services
Preceding station	Tsukuba Express	Following station
Moriya (TX15) towards Akihabara	Tsukuba Express Commuter-Rapid	Tsukuba (TX20) Terminus
Bampaku-kinenkōen (TX18) towards Akihabara	Tsukuba Express Semi-Rapid Local	Tsukuba (TX20) Terminus
Location
- Location within Ibaraki Prefecture Location within Japan

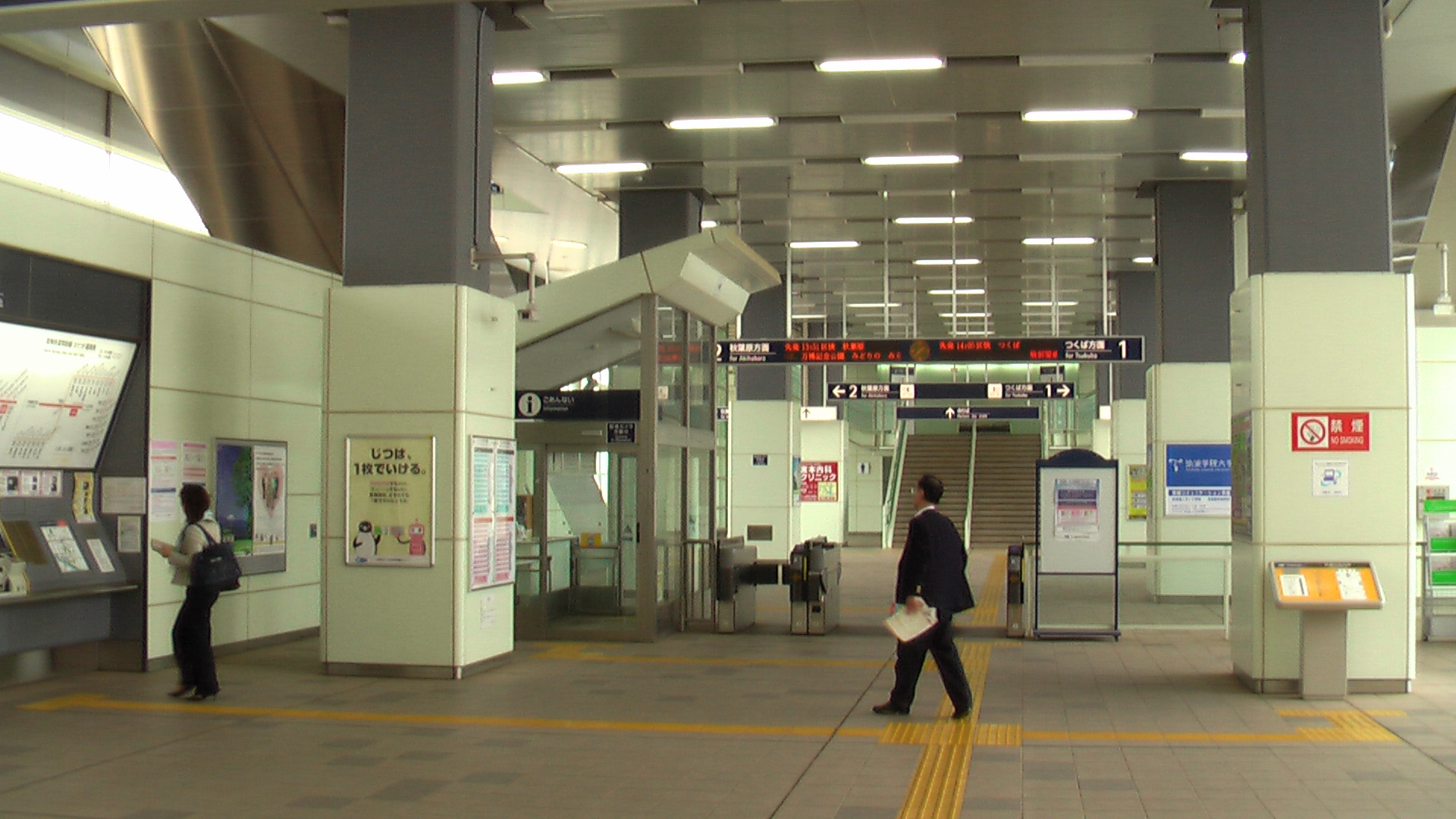
Concourse level of Kenkyū-gakuen Station.

Kenkyū-gakuen Station (研究学園駅, Kenkyū-gakuen-eki) is a passenger railway station in the city of Tsukuba, Ibaraki, Japan, operated by the Metropolitan Intercity Railway Company. Its station number is TX19.

== Line ==
Kenkyū-gakuen Station is served by Metropolitan Intercity Railway Company (Tsukuba Express) and is located 55.6 km from the official starting point of the line at Akihabara Station.

== Station layout ==
The station consists of two side opposed side platforms on a viaduct, with the station building located underneath.

=== Platforms ===
1	■ TX Tsukuba Express	for Tsukuba
2	■ TX Tsukuba Express	for Akihabara

== History ==
Kenkyū-gakuen Station opened on 24 August 2005.

== Passenger statistics ==
In fiscal 2019, the station was used by an average of 7367 passengers daily (boarding passengers only).

== Surrounding area ==
- Tsukuba City Hall
- iias TSUKUBA
- Costco
- Torisen Kenkyū-gakuen Shop

== See also ==
- List of railway stations in Japan
