= Tsukuba Botanical Garden =

Botanical garden in Ibaraki Prefecture, Japan

Coordinates: 36°06′05″N 140°06′42″E

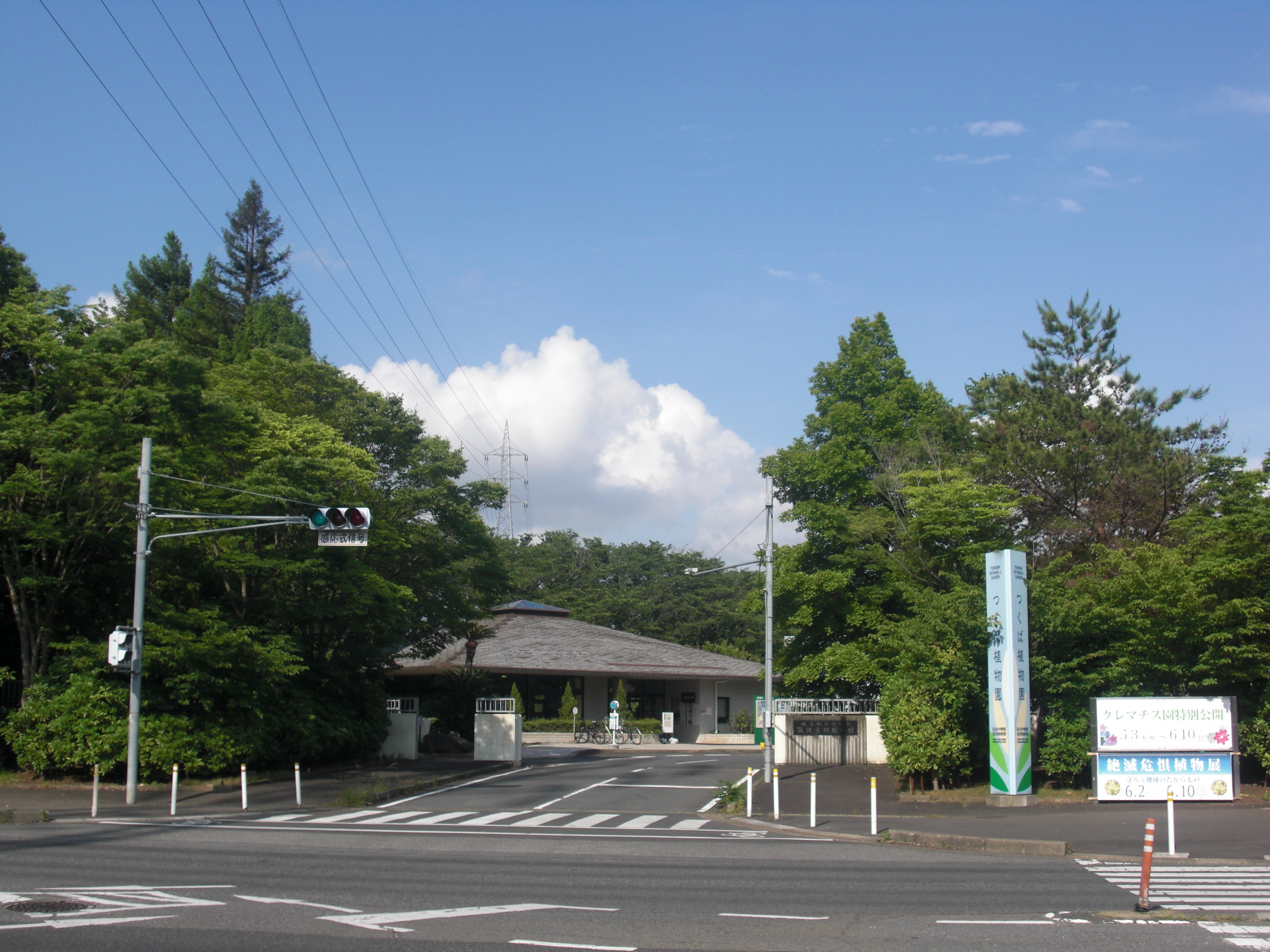
- Tsukuba Botanical Garden
- Interactive map of Tsukuba Botanical Garden
- Type: Botanical garden
- Location: 4-1-1 Amakubo, Tsukuba, Ibaraki Prefecture, Japan
- Area: 14 hectares (35 acres)
- Opened: 1976; 50 years ago
- Operator: National Museum of Nature and Science

The Tsukuba Botanical Garden (筑波実験植物園, Tsukuba Jikken Shokubutsuen) is a major botanical garden and research institute located near the University of Tsukuba campus in Ibaraki Prefecture, Japan. It is open daily except Mondays; an admission fee is charged.

As a research branch of the National Museum of Nature and Science, the garden is one of Japan's foremost botanical research facilities and provides public education. It currently contains about 5000 taxa of domestic and exotic plants from temperate and tropical regions around the world, with a particular emphasis on vascular plants of central Japan, East Asian ferns, Cycadaceae, Colocasia, and South American orchids.

The garden's outdoor collections are arranged into the following sections: Evergreen Broad-leaved Forest, Temperate Coniferous Forest, Warm-temperate Deciduous Broad-leaved Forest, Cool-temperate Deciduous Broad-leaved Forest, Shrubs, Sandy and Gravelly, Montane Grassland (High Altitudes), Montane Grassland (Low Altitudes), Rookeries (Coastral), Rookeries (High Altitudes), Marsh Plants, and Hygrophytes and Aquatic Plants.

The garden contains three greenhouses:

- Tropical Resource Plants House (about 550 m², 17.5m high) — useful plants from the tropics.
- Tropical Rain Forest House (about 24 meters high) — two rooms for Lowland and Montane climates, emphasizing plants of Asian-Pacific regions. The Montane room conserves species such as fagaceous, ericaceous, and orchidaceous plants with high diversities in South-east Asia.
- Savanna House — tropical and subtropical plants from semi-arid savanna areas, with zones for the Americas, Africa, and Australia.

As of 2007 the garden supported eight researchers in plant taxonomy, with ongoing studies in cytotaxonomy to determine the number and shape of chromosomes, molecular biology based on DNA sequencing, chemotaxonomy using secondary metabolites, and plant morphology based on branching systems and pedology.

== See also ==
- List of botanical gardens in Japan
