= Tsukuba =

City in Ibaraki Prefecture, Japan

Tsukuba つくば市
- Special city
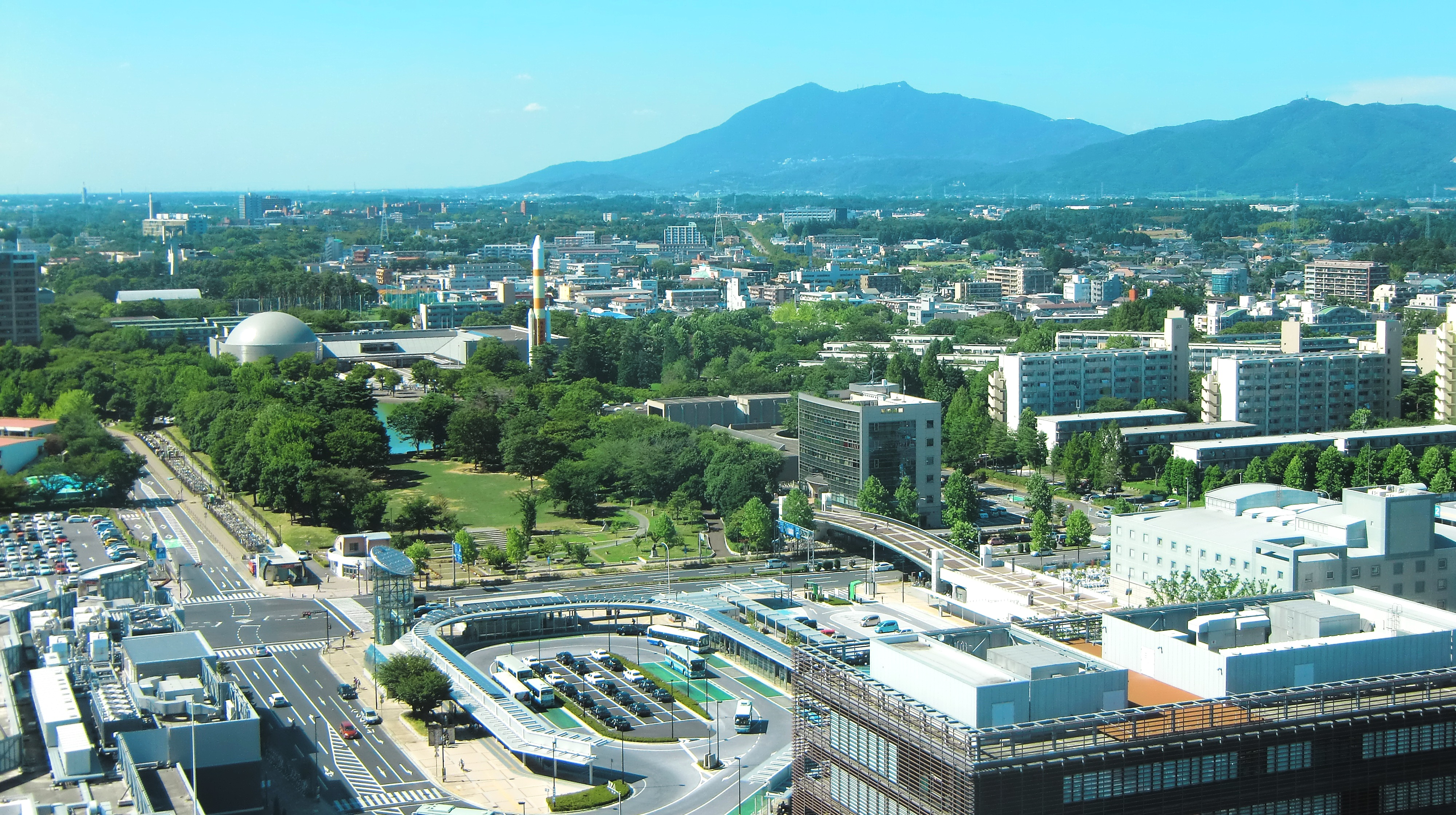
- View of Mount Tsukuba and Tsukuba Center

- Flag Seal

- Location of Tsukuba in Ibaraki Prefecture

- Coordinates: 36°5′0.5″N 140°4′35.2″E
- Country: Japan
- Region: Kantō
- Prefecture: Ibaraki
- First official recorded: 180 AD
- Tsukuba town settled: April 1, 1889
- Tsukuba city settled: November 30, 1987

Government
  - Mayor: Tatsuo Igarashi (from November 2016)

Area
  - Special city: 283.72 km^{2} (109.54 sq mi)

Population (January 1, 2024)
  - Special city: 256,526
  - Density: 904.15/km^{2} (2,341.7/sq mi)
  - Metro (2015): 843,402 (19th)
- Time zone: UTC+9 (Japan Standard Time)
- Address: 2530-2 Karima, Tsukuba-shi, Ibaraki-ken 305-8555
- Climate: Cfa
- Website: Official website
- Symbols
- Bird: Ural owl
- Flower: Hoshizaki-yukinoshita (Saxifraga stolonifera Curtis f. aptera (Makino) H.Hara)
- Tree: Japanese zelkova

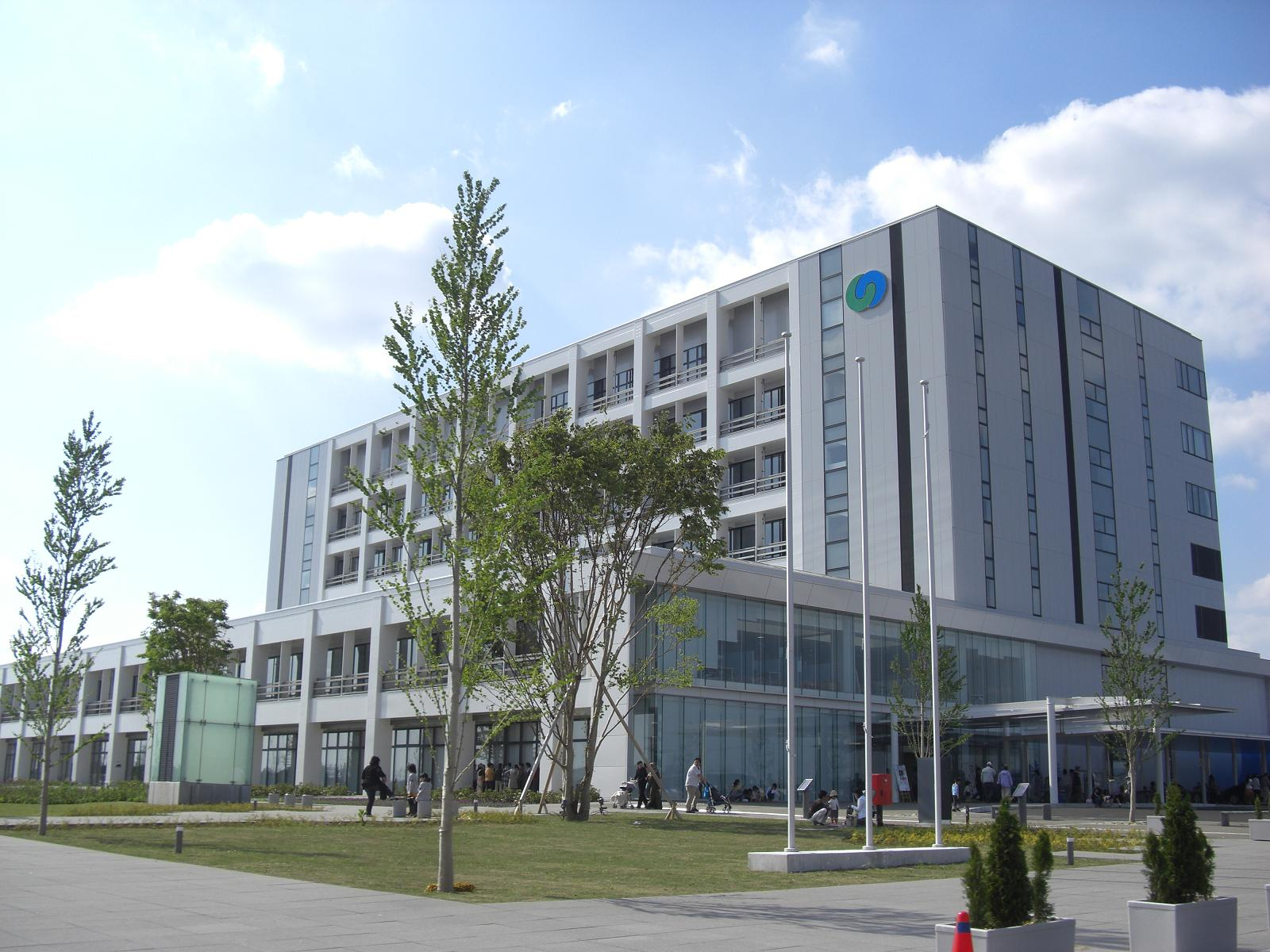
Tsukuba City Hall

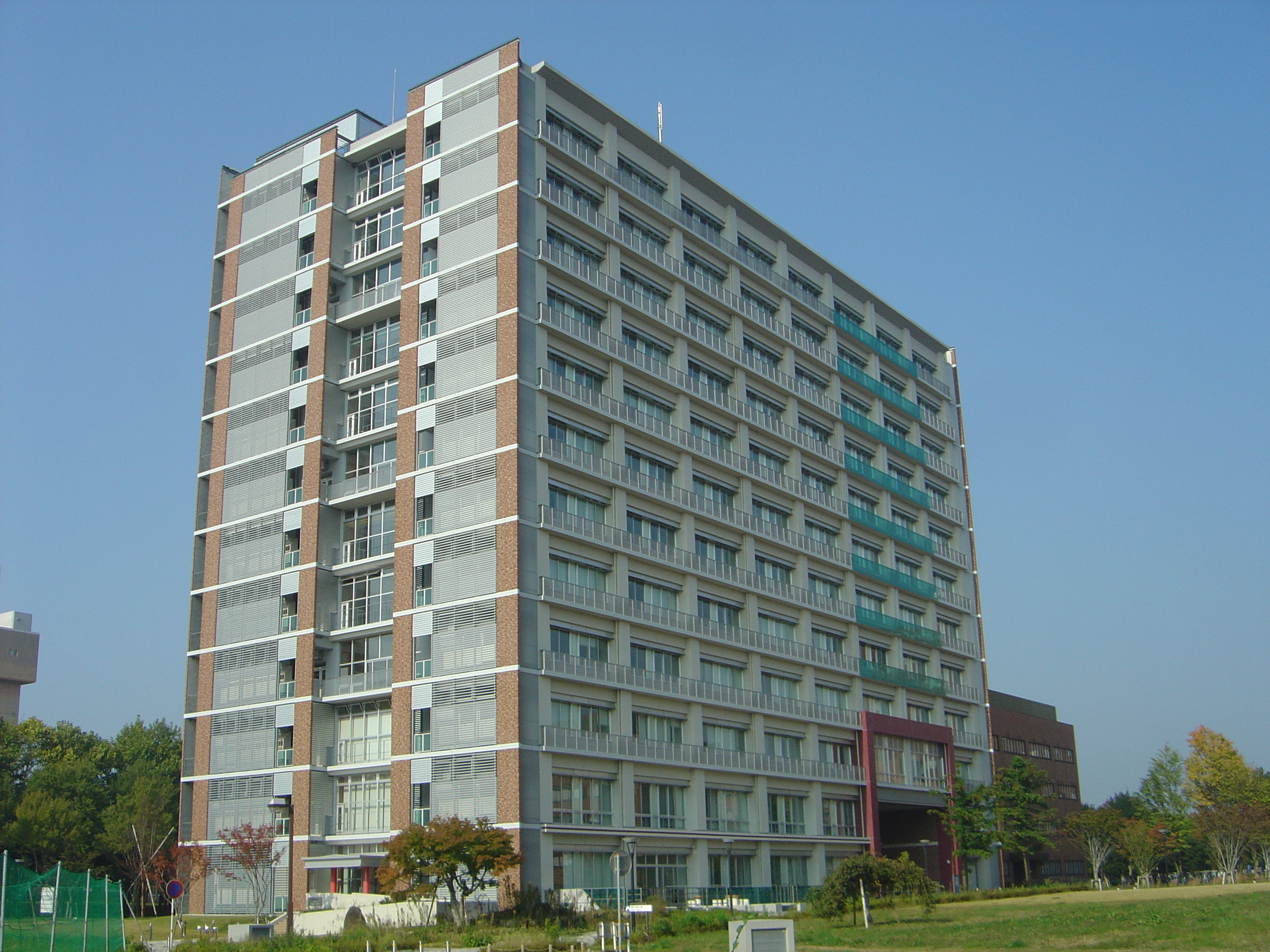
One of the buildings at the University of Tsukuba

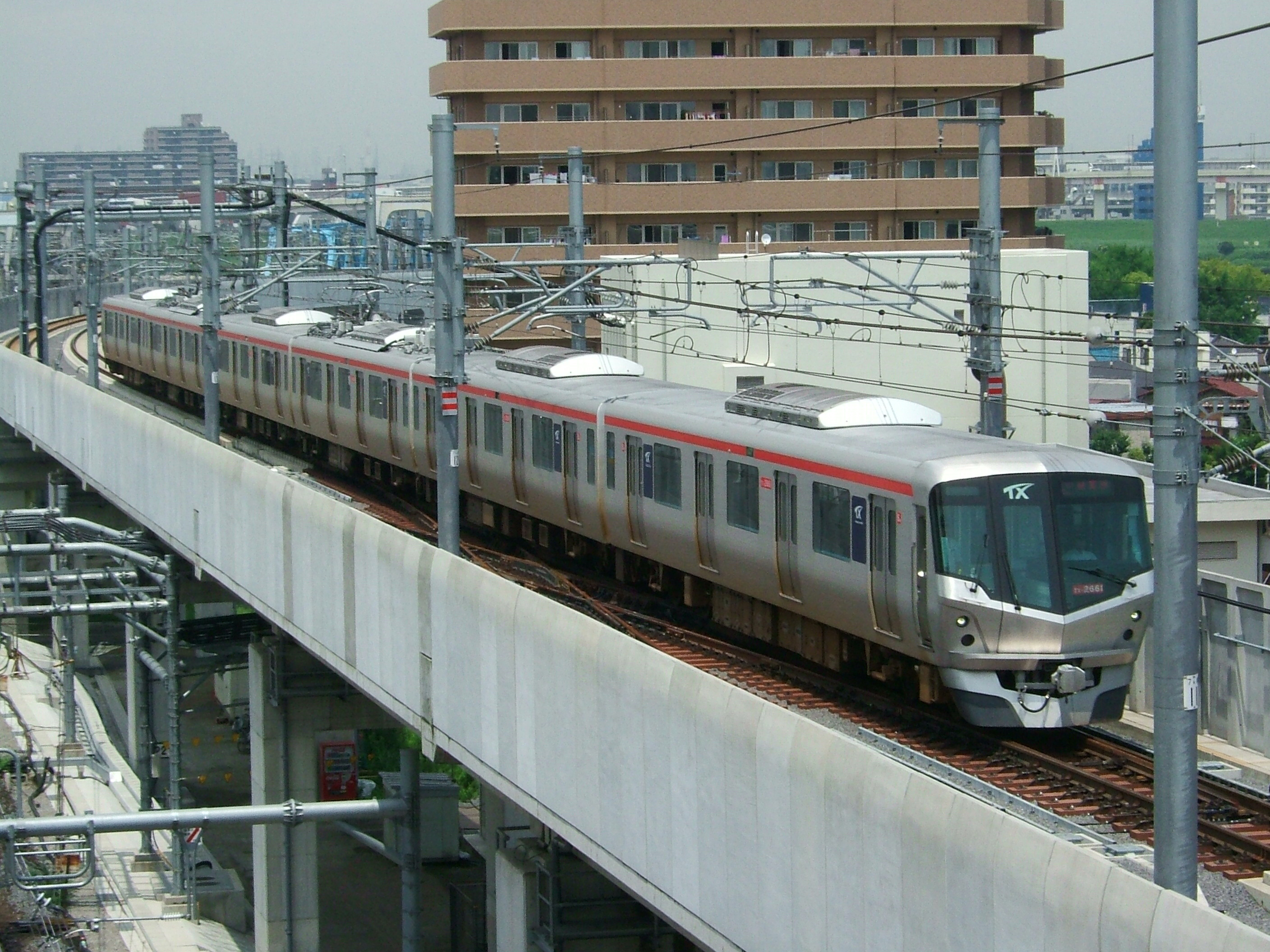
Tsukuba Express

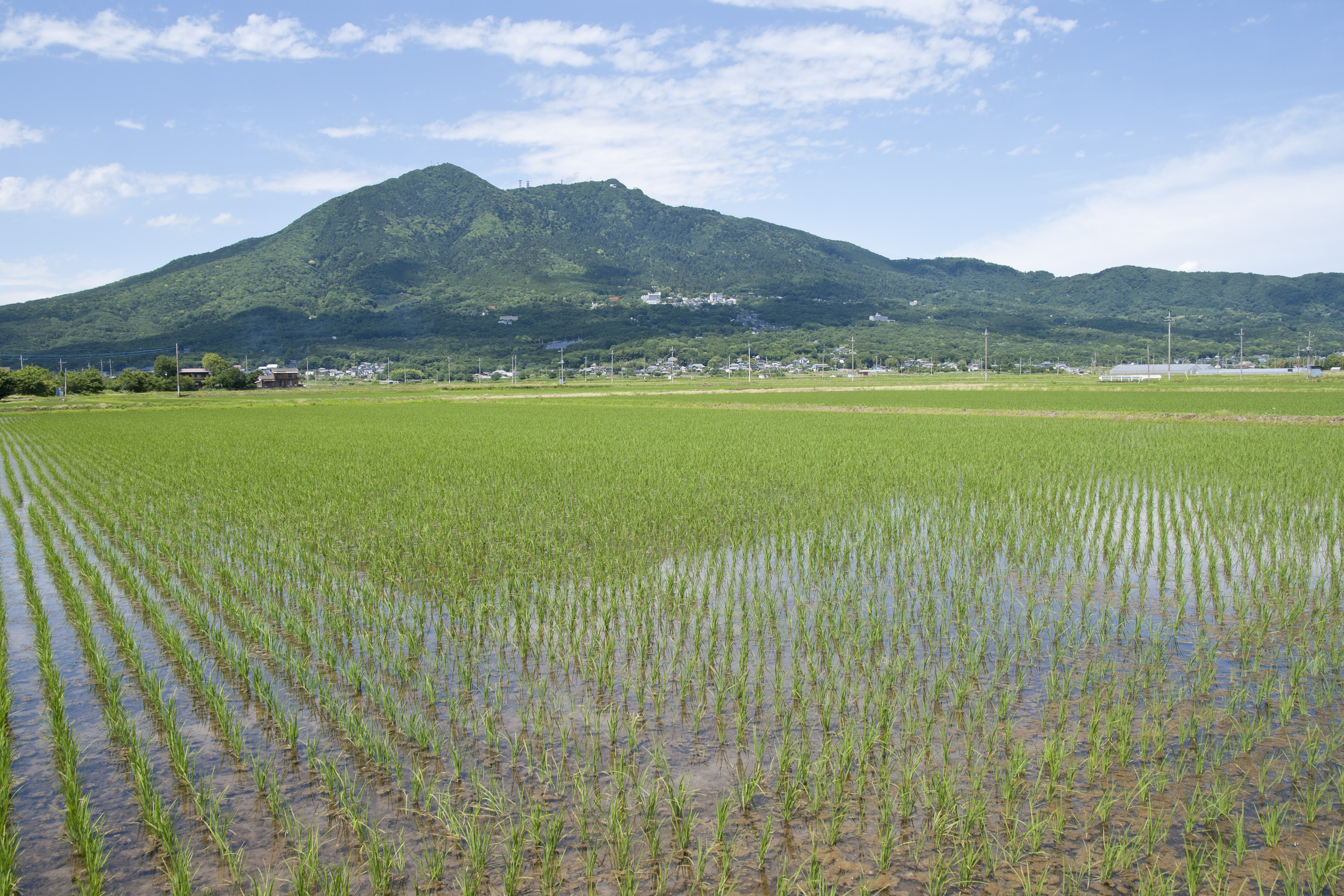
Mount Tsukuba

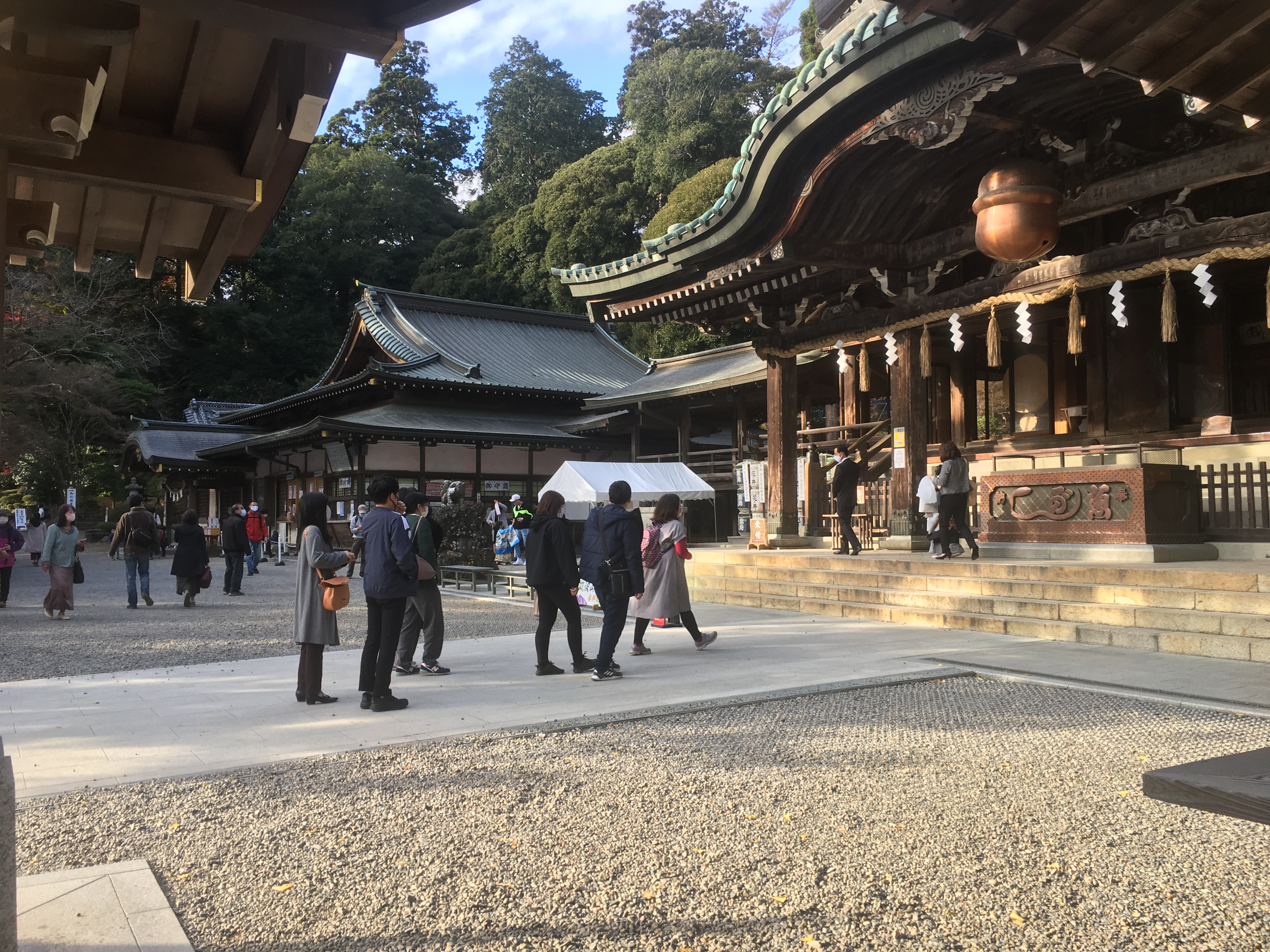
Tsukuba Shrine

Tsukuba (つくば市, Tsukuba-shi) is a city located in Ibaraki Prefecture, Japan. As of January 1, 2024, the city had an estimated population of 256,526 in 121,001 households and a population density of 900 persons per km^{2}. The percentage of the population aged over 65 was 20.3%. The total area of the city is 283.72 square kilometres (109.54 sq mi). It is known as the location of the Tsukuba Science City (筑波研究学園都市, Tsukuba Kenkyū Gakuen Toshi), a planned science park developed in the 1960s.

== Geography ==
Tsukuba is located in southern Ibaraki Prefecture, approximately 50 kilometers from central Tokyo and about 40 kilometers from Narita International Airport. Mount Tsukuba, from which the city takes its name, is located in the northern part of the city. Except for the area around Mount Tsukuba, the city is a part of the Kantō Plain with an altitude of 20 to 30 meters.

Mountains: Mount Tsukuba, Mount Hokyo.

Rivers: Kokai River, Sakura River, Higashiyata River, Nishiyata River, Ono River, Hanamuro River, Inari River.

Parks: The city has more than 100 parks and green areas to relax in. Different parks are connected by pedestrian walk and bikeways. Some parks are equipped with tennis courts and round pavements for jogging and walking. Dōhō Park, a park surrounded by vegetation centered in Dōhō Swamp, has a baseball field, a soccer field, a gym and a heated indoor pool equipped with a solar heating system. Matsumi Park has a 45m-high observation deck and a Japanese style garden with flowers and a small pond.

Gardens: Tsukuba Botanical Garden and Tsukuba Peony Garden.

In the extreme south is the Ushiku Lagoon; the Nishiyata, Higashiyata and Inari rivers discharge their waters into it. The Ushiku Lagoon, through the Yata River, flows into the Kokai River.

At the end of their courses, the Kokai River discharge into the Tone River, and the Sakura, Hanamuro and Ono rivers discharge into the Lake Kasumigaura.

=== Surrounding municipalities ===
Ibaraki Prefecture

- Chikusei
- Ishioka
- Jōsō
- Ryūgasaki
- Sakuragawa
- Shimotsuma
- Tsuchiura
- Tsukubamirai
- Ushiku

=== Climate ===
Tsukuba has a humid subtropical climate (Köppen Cfa) characterized by warm summers and cool winters with light snowfall. The average annual temperature in Tsukuba is 14.3 °C (57.7 °F). The average annual rainfall is 1,326.0 mm (52.20 in) with September as the wettest month. The temperatures are highest on average in August, at around 25.9 °C (78.6 °F), and lowest in January, at around 3.1 °C (37.6 °F).

Climate data for Tsukuba (1991−2020 normals, extremes 1921−present)
Month	Jan	Feb	Mar	Apr	May	Jun	Jul	Aug	Sep	Oct	Nov	Dec	Year
Record high °C (°F)	22.2 (72.0)	24.5 (76.1)	27.5 (81.5)	29.1 (84.4)	34.1 (93.4)	36.7 (98.1)	37.3 (99.1)	37.8 (100.0)	36.9 (98.4)	32.7 (90.9)	25.8 (78.4)	24.4 (75.9)	37.8 (100.0)
Mean maximum °C (°F)	15.1 (59.2)	18.4 (65.1)	22.1 (71.8)	26.0 (78.8)	29.1 (84.4)	31.5 (88.7)	34.9 (94.8)	35.4 (95.7)	33.1 (91.6)	28.0 (82.4)	22.1 (71.8)	17.8 (64.0)	35.9 (96.6)
Mean daily maximum °C (°F)	9.3 (48.7)	10.2 (50.4)	13.6 (56.5)	18.7 (65.7)	22.7 (72.9)	25.2 (77.4)	29.1 (84.4)	30.6 (87.1)	26.8 (80.2)	21.3 (70.3)	16.3 (61.3)	11.5 (52.7)	19.6 (67.3)
Daily mean °C (°F)	3.1 (37.6)	4.2 (39.6)	7.7 (45.9)	12.8 (55.0)	17.4 (63.3)	20.8 (69.4)	24.6 (76.3)	25.9 (78.6)	22.3 (72.1)	16.6 (61.9)	10.5 (50.9)	5.3 (41.5)	14.3 (57.7)
Mean daily minimum °C (°F)	−2.8 (27.0)	−1.8 (28.8)	1.7 (35.1)	6.9 (44.4)	12.3 (54.1)	16.9 (62.4)	21.0 (69.8)	22.1 (71.8)	18.5 (65.3)	12.1 (53.8)	5.2 (41.4)	−0.5 (31.1)	9.3 (48.8)
Mean minimum °C (°F)	−7.2 (19.0)	−6.1 (21.0)	−4.3 (24.3)	−0.7 (30.7)	5.3 (41.5)	11.3 (52.3)	16.8 (62.2)	17.8 (64.0)	11.6 (52.9)	4.8 (40.6)	−1.4 (29.5)	−5.3 (22.5)	−7.5 (18.5)
Record low °C (°F)	−14.8 (5.4)	−17.0 (1.4)	−11.6 (11.1)	−6.4 (20.5)	−2.6 (27.3)	5.7 (42.3)	9.8 (49.6)	12.0 (53.6)	5.0 (41.0)	−1.4 (29.5)	−7.8 (18.0)	−11.9 (10.6)	−17.0 (1.4)
Average precipitation mm (inches)	50.6 (1.99)	47.1 (1.85)	95.5 (3.76)	109.8 (4.32)	129.8 (5.11)	131.8 (5.19)	134.6 (5.30)	118.2 (4.65)	187.6 (7.39)	193.5 (7.62)	79.1 (3.11)	48.5 (1.91)	1,326 (52.20)
Average snowfall cm (inches)	6 (2.4)	5 (2.0)	1 (0.4)	0 (0)	0 (0)	0 (0)	0 (0)	0 (0)	0 (0)	0 (0)	0 (0)	1 (0.4)	13 (5.1)
Average precipitation days (≥ 1.0 mm)	4.3	5.0	9.0	9.8	10.2	11.4	10.4	7.1	10.4	10.5	7.1	5.0	100.2
Average snowy days (≥ 1 cm)	1.3	1.3	0.3	0	0	0	0	0	0	0	0	0.2	3.1
Average relative humidity (%)	64	63	66	70	75	81	82	81	82	81	78	70	74
Mean monthly sunshine hours	206.8	181.8	182.6	181.4	182.8	129.3	152.8	182.8	136.4	138.4	153.6	185.7	2,014.5
Source 1: Japan Meteorological Agency
Source 2: 理科年表

== Demographics ==
Per Japanese census data, the population of Tsukuba has increased rapidly since 1980.

Historical population
Year	Pop.	±%
1950	91,173	—
1960	82,423	−9.6%
1970	78,110	−5.2%
1980	127,402	+63.1%
1990	168,466	+32.2%
2000	191,814	+13.9%
2010	214,590	+11.9%
2020	241,656	+12.6%

== History ==
Mount Tsukuba has been a place of pilgrimage since at least the Heian period. During the Edo period, parts of what later became the city of Tsukuba were administered by a junior branch of the Hosokawa clan at Yatabe Domain, one of the feudal domains of the Tokugawa shogunate. With the creation of the modern municipalities system after the Meiji Restoration on April 1, 1889, the town Yatabe was established within Tsukuba District, Ibaraki.

Beginning in the 1960s, the area was designated for development. Construction of the city centre, the University of Tsukuba and 46 public basic scientific research laboratories began in the 1970s. Tsukuba Science City became operational in the 1980s. The Expo '85 world's fair was held in the area of Tsukuba Science City, which at the time was still divided administratively between several small towns and villages. Attractions at the event included the 85-metre (279 ft) Technocosmos, which at that time was the world's tallest Ferris wheel.

On November 30, 1987 the town of Yatabe merged with the neighboring towns of Ōho and Toyosato (from Tsukuba District)) and the village of Sakura (from Niihari District) to create the city of Tsukuba. The neighboring town of Tsukuba merged with the city of Tsukuba on January 1, 1988. Followed by the town of Kukizaki (from Inashiki District) on November 1, 2002. Therefore, Yatabe, Ōho, Toyosato, Sakura, Tsukuba and Kukizaki, correspond to the ancient towns and villages.

By 2000, the city's 60 national research institutes and two national universities had been grouped into five zones: higher education and training, construction research, physical science and engineering research, biological and agricultural research, and common (public) facilities. These zones were surrounded by more than 240 private research facilities. Among the most prominent institutions are the University of Tsukuba (1973; formerly Tokyo University of Education); the High Energy Accelerator Research Organization (KEK); the National Institute of Advanced Industrial Science and Technology; the Electrotechnical Laboratory; the Mechanical Engineering Laboratory; and the National Institute for Materials Science. The city has an international flair, with about 7,500 foreign students and researchers from as many as 133 countries living in Tsukuba at any one time.

Over the past several decades, nearly half of Japan's public research and development budget has been spent in Tsukuba. Important scientific breakthroughs by its researchers include the identification and specification of the molecular structure of superconducting materials, the development of organic optical films that alter their electrical conductivity in response to changing light, and the creation of extreme low-pressure vacuum chambers. Tsukuba has become one of the world's key sites for government-industry collaborations in basic research. Earthquake safety, environmental degradation, studies of roadways, fermentation science, microbiology, and plant genetics are some of the broad research topics having close public-private partnerships.

On April 1, 2007 Tsukuba was designated a Special city with increased autonomy.

Following the Fukushima I nuclear accidents in 2011, evacuees from the accident zone reported that municipal officials in Tsukuba refused to allow them access to shelters in the city unless they presented certificates from the Fukushima government declaring that the evacuees were "radiation free".

On May 6, 2012, Tsukuba was struck by a tornado that caused heavy damage to numerous structures and left approximately 20,000 residents without electricity. The storm killed one 14-year-old boy and injured 45 people. The tornado was rated an F-3 by the Japan Meteorological Agency, making it the most powerful tornado to ever hit Japan. Some spots had F-4 damage.

== Government ==
Tsukuba has a mayor-council form of government with a directly elected mayor and a unicameral city council of 28 members. Tsukuba contributes five members to the Ibaraki Prefectural Assembly. In terms of national politics, the city is part of Ibaraki 6th district of the lower house of the Diet of Japan.

== Economy ==
The local economy was traditionally based on rice production, and Tsukuba still has the largest area under paddy fields in Ibaraki Prefecture. After the establishment of Tsukuba Science City, the numerous government and private research institutes has drawn a large number of factories and supporting businesses.

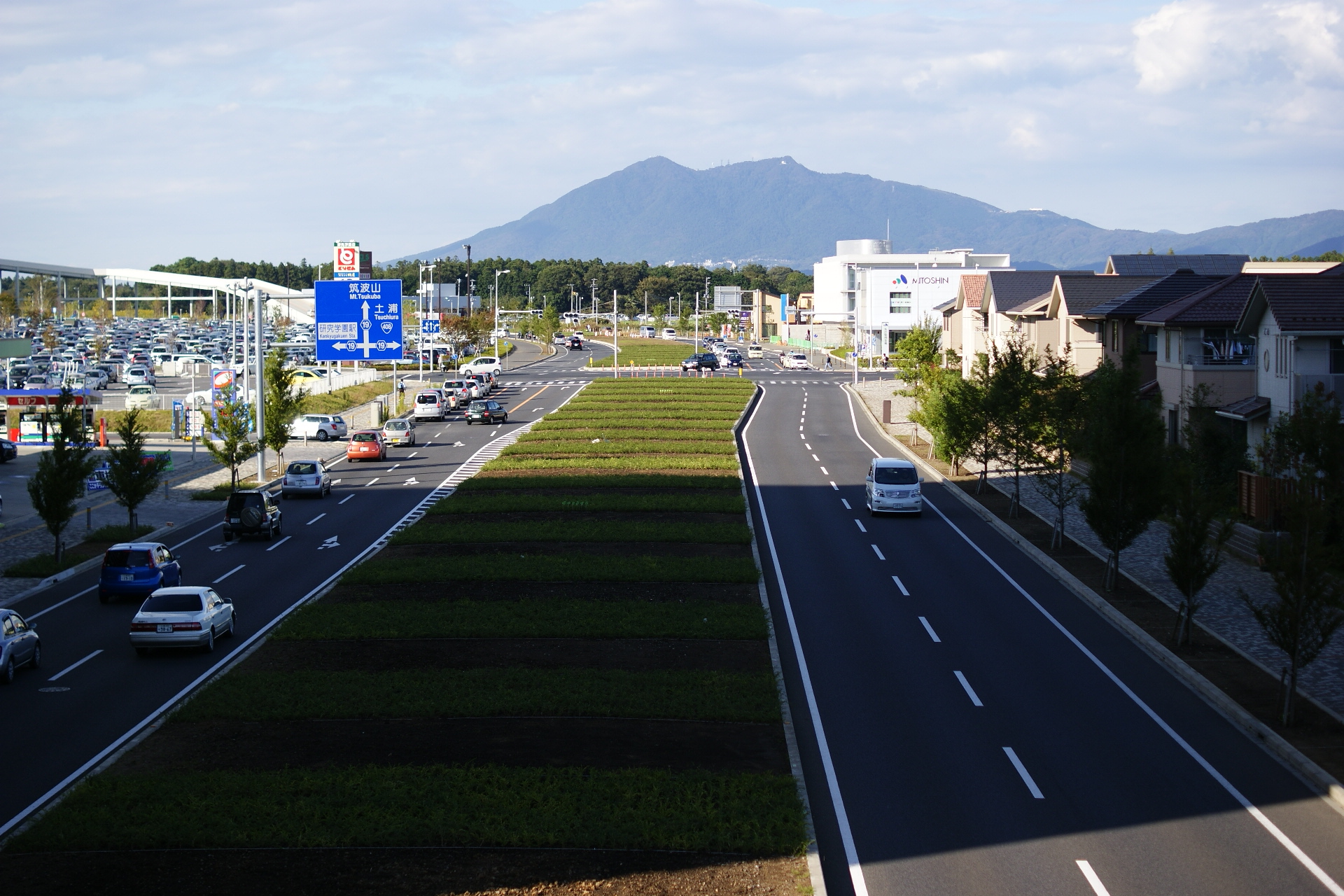
Route in Tsukuba

=== Companies headquartered in Tsukuba ===
- Cyberdyne Inc.
- Intel Japan (1980-2016)
- SoftEther Corporation
- V.M. Technology (1986-1997)

=== Manufacturing ===
- Komori Corporation has its main manufacturing plant in Tsukuba.

== Education ==
=== Higher education ===
- Graduate University for Advanced Studies, Tsukuba Campus
- National University Corporation Tsukuba University of Technology
- Tsukuba Gakuin University
- University of Tsukuba, Tsukuba Campus

=== Primary and secondary education ===
Tsukuba has 29 public elementary schools and 12 public middle schools operated by the city government, and four public high school operated by the Ibaraki Prefectural Board of Education. The prefecture also operates one combined middle school/high school and one special education school for the handicapped. There is also one private combined middle/high school.

In addition, it has international schools, like Tsukuba International School and Liberty International School, and also has a Brazilian school, the Instituto Educare (former Escola Pingo de Gente).

== Transportation ==
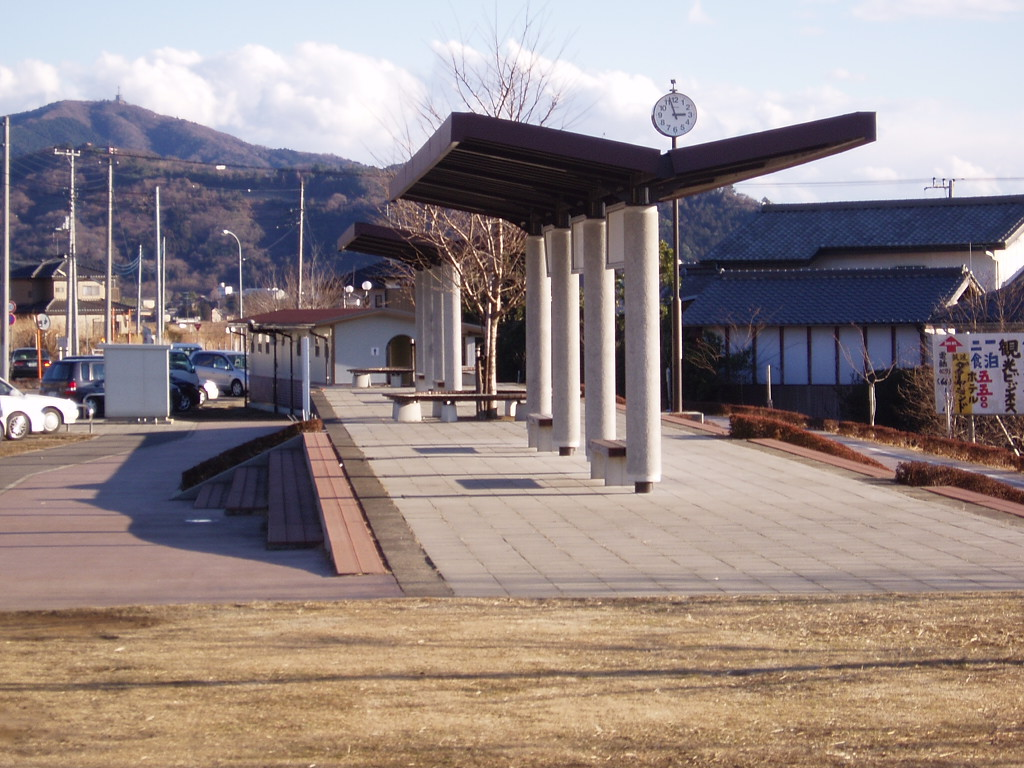
Tsukuba Railway - Tsukuba Station Ruins. Tsukuba Railway, started 1918 suspended 1987

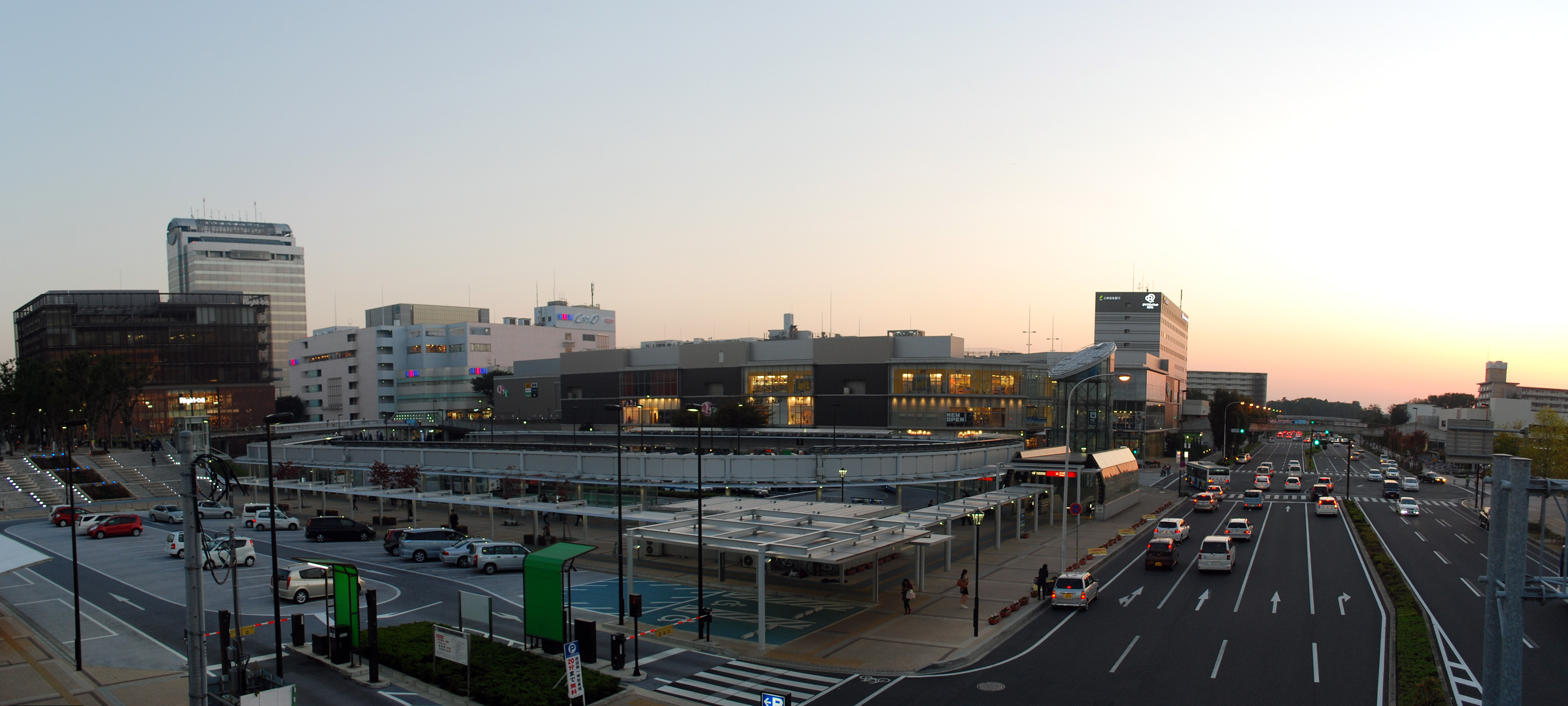
Tsukuba Express - Tsukuba Station

=== Railway ===
Metropolitan Intercity Railway Company – Tsukuba Express

- Stations in Tsukuba: Midorino - Bampaku-kinenkōen - Kenkyū-gakuen - Tsukuba

Tsukuba Kankō Railway

- Mount Tsukuba Cable Car
- Mount Tsukuba Ropeway

=== Highway ===
- Jōban Expressway – Yatabe Interchange, Tsukuba Junction, Yatabe-Higashi Parking Area, Sakura-Tsuchiura Interchange
- Ken-Ō Expressway – Tsukuba-Chuo Interchange, Tsukuba Junction, Tsukuba-Ushiku Interchange
- National Route 6
- National Route 125
- National Route 354
- National Route 408
- National Route 468 – (Ken-Ō Expressway, is signed as National Route 468 as well as C4.)

== Media ==
- Academic Newtown Community Cable Service (ACCS)
- Tsukuba Community Broadcast Inc. – Radio Tsukuba

== Local attractions ==
=== Tsukuba Science City ===
Tsukuba Science City is a center for research and education in the city of Tsukuba, located northeast of Tokyo. The idea of constructing the science city was by the late Ichiro Kono, former minister of construction, and Kuniomi Umezawa, former vice minister of the science and technology agency. Another key figure for the development of the Science City is Leo Esaki. What sets Tsukuba apart from other town developments in Japan is the large scale and fast pace of its development into a place with high quality of scientific innovation.

==== History ====
In September 1963, the national government of Japan, led by Ichiro Kono and Kniomi Umezawa, ordered the development of a science city in the area around the mountain Tsukuba. Reasons behind this decision included the overcrowding in Tokyo, the overflow of applicants to Japanese elite universities, a desire of conservative politicians to decrease the influence of liberal teachers and students, and a need to catch up with the West in terms of scientific knowledge. Furthermore, it was already clear that there was a demand for new research facilities and a fresh approach to university education. This fresh approach was prevalent in the United States; therefore, Japan's Ministry of Education decided to transfer a part of the Tokyo University of Education to the Tsukuba area. The campus of the university was modeled after the University of California, San Diego, campus. After a new university structure was introduced; the power of teachers decreased and the power of administrative management increased. Furthermore, the new structure led to better research facilities, a separate independent research department and the implementation of a board for general policies and regulations.

In 1966, after a few years of intensive study, the government started the project by buying land in the Tsukuba area. The acquiring of land to build on was done by negotiation over prices between the government and landowners. The parcels of land with the most suitable price were purchased. This is reason for the odd shape of the government-owned land in Tsukuba; it is 18 kilometers long from north to east and 6 kilometers wide from east to west. Due to this shape walking is not common in the city.

The building of facilities started in June 1969. The initial building plan was ten years, but in 1980 it became clear that that would not be the case. However, in March 1980 all the facilities that were meant to be built were up and running to a certain extent.

Between 1970 and 1980 researchers and their families started to move to Tsukuba. This move was a culture shock for the families from Tokyo due to the dirt roads and open fields in Tsukuba.

Initially, Tsukuba was built for travel by car due to having no train station. It was actually Japan's first city that promoted automobile travel over public transport. In 2005, a train station was built in the city. The Tsukuba Express travels from Tokyo to the Science City in 45 minutes.

Tsukuba Expo 1985

In order to promote the positive aspects of science and technology, an International Science and Technology Exposition was held. This was a landmark for the science city. The reasons behind the expo were to establish a positive national image of Tsukuba Science City and to gain international recognition that Tsukuba was a place of science. The Expo attracted around 20 million Japanese and foreign visitors.

==== Leo Esaki ====
Leo Esaki became the president of the University of Tsukuba in 1992. His presidency marked a new era of reform for the Tsukuba Science City. Leo Esaki is a Nobel prize winner and worked at IBM prior to becoming president of the University of Tsukuba. Unlike other Japanese university presidents he had no academic background and no former ties with the University of Tsukuba. This was part of the reason why he was chosen as president. Due to his history in the corporate world, he was able to create a climate where companies and graduate students could work together closely. When the university was founded a good relationship between the students of the university and the nearby companies was expected. However, over the years this ambition disappeared into the background. In these years there was a severe lack in interaction between the facilities of the University and the private companies in the area. This meant that there was no joint research happening. In July 1994, Esaki introduced Tsukuba Advanced Research Alliance (TARA). This is a partnership between the university, foreign researchers, Tsukuba's national research labs, and corporate laboratories based in the city.

==== Criticism ====
Tsukuba Science City has faced considerable criticism since its inception. The first criticism on the city was that it was not habitable. Wives of the first researchers were used to putting garbage on the side of the road in order for it to get picked up. However, this was not the case in the mid-1970s. Until that time only farmers had lived there and they would process their own garbage into mulch. Because the garbage did not get picked up, it started smelling in the streets. This enraged the housewives and they demanded a garbage service. In order to meet the demand, a pit was dug where the waste could be dumped until a garbage service would be developed in the city. In the 1990s, Tsukuba had the most innovative garbage system in Japan.

Another criticism levied by national government critics is that Tsukuba Science City is a waste of taxpayer's money. They also believe that Tsukuba is an example of government control of academic and research organization. In addition, social critics feel that Tsukuba's social organization is unfavorable as it lacks traditional Japanese culture.

Garner describes the city is described as being ‘flat’ due to a lack of city life. Even though Tsukuba Science City has an impressive number of research and development facilities and various companies, it still is not able to reach the same level of innovation as science cities that do have stimulating city life. In 2006, Tsukuba Science City started focusing on creating more city life to address this problem.

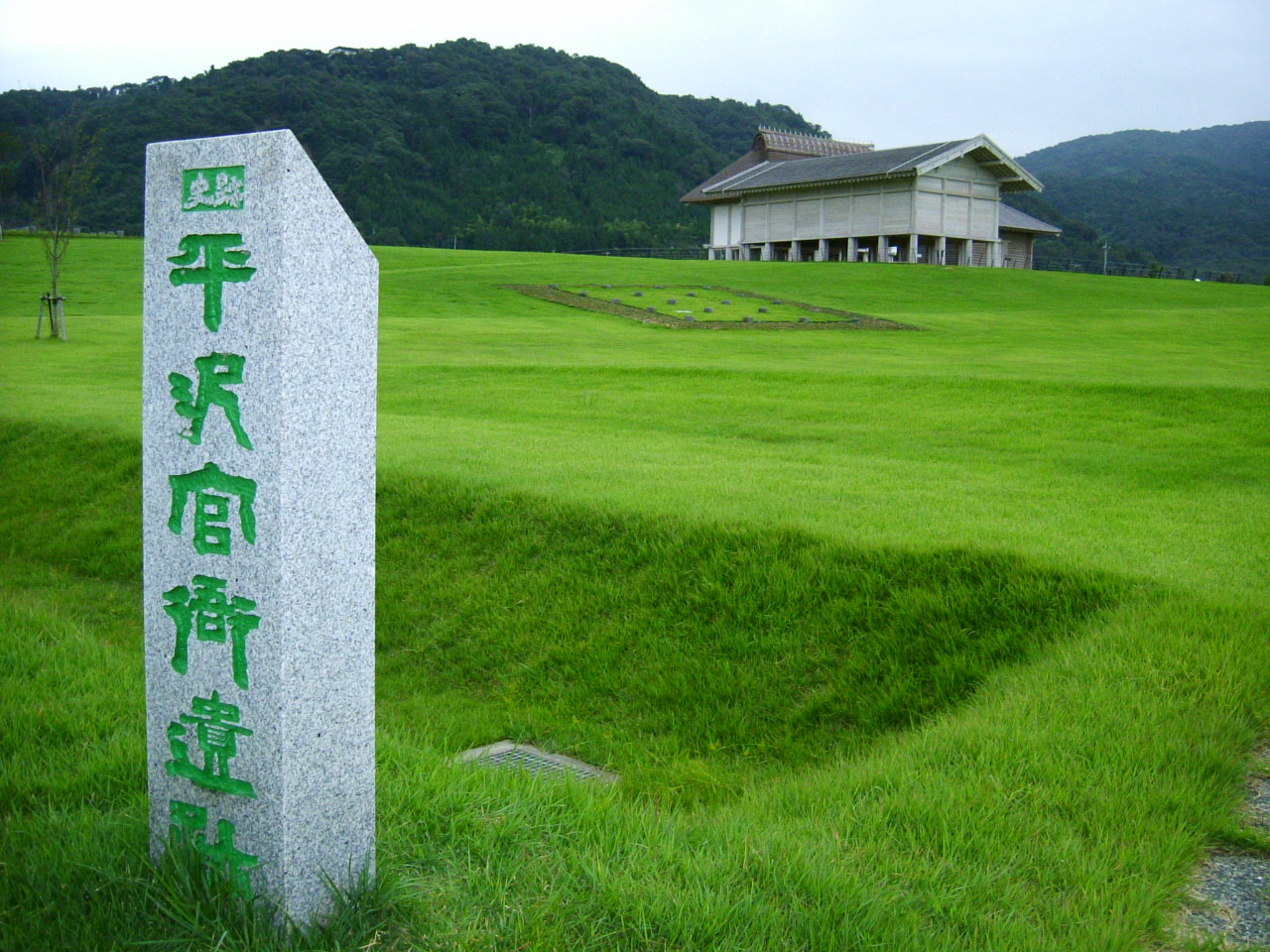
Hirasawa Kangai ruins archaeological site

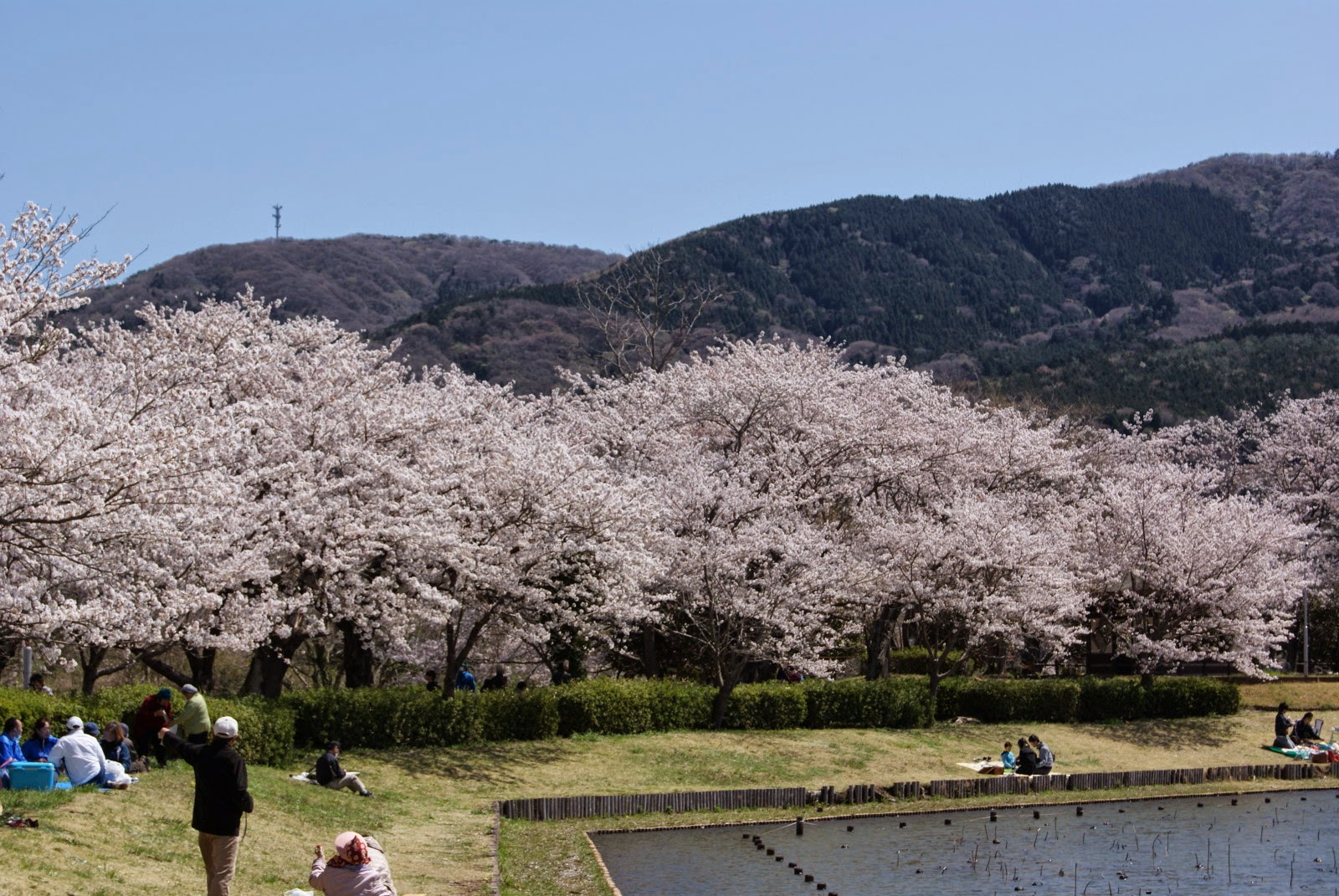
Hōjō pond (Hōjō Ōike) in spring

=== Museums ===
- Cyberdyne Studio - Robotic technologies
- Geological Museum
- JAXA Tsukuba Space Center
- KEK Exhibition Hall
- Science Museum of Map and Survey
- Tsukuba Botanical Garden
- Tsukuba Expo Center – Planetarium

=== Other attractions ===
- Hirasawa Kanga ruins archaeological site (National Historic Site)
- Kanamura Wake Ikazuchi Shrine
- Mount Tsukuba
- Site of Oda Castle (National Historic Site)
- Tsukubasan Shrine

== Sister cities ==
- Irvine, California, United States, since 1989
- Milpitas, California, United States, since 1996
- Cambridge, Massachusetts, United States, since 1984
- Grenoble, France, since 2013
- Bochum, Germany, since 2019
- Shenzhen, China, friendship city

== Notable people from Tsukuba ==
- Leo Esaki, Nobel Prize winner
- Nozomu Kawai (* 1968 in Tokyo), Egyptologist
- Susumu Hirasawa, progressive-electronic musician has a studio in Tsukuba
- Ai Mori, competition rock climber
- Hitoshi Igarashi, literary scholar and translator
- Mitsuhiro Ishida, mixed martial artist
- Yasuaki Kurata, actor
- Hideki Shirakawa, Nobel Prize winner
- Haruka Sunada, volleyball player
- Minanogawa Tōzō, sumo wrestler
- Hiroki Yamada, baseball player

== See also ==
- List of technology centers
- List of research parks
