= Tsukuba Station =

Railway station in Tsukuba, Ibaraki Prefecture, Japan

Tsukuba Station つくば駅
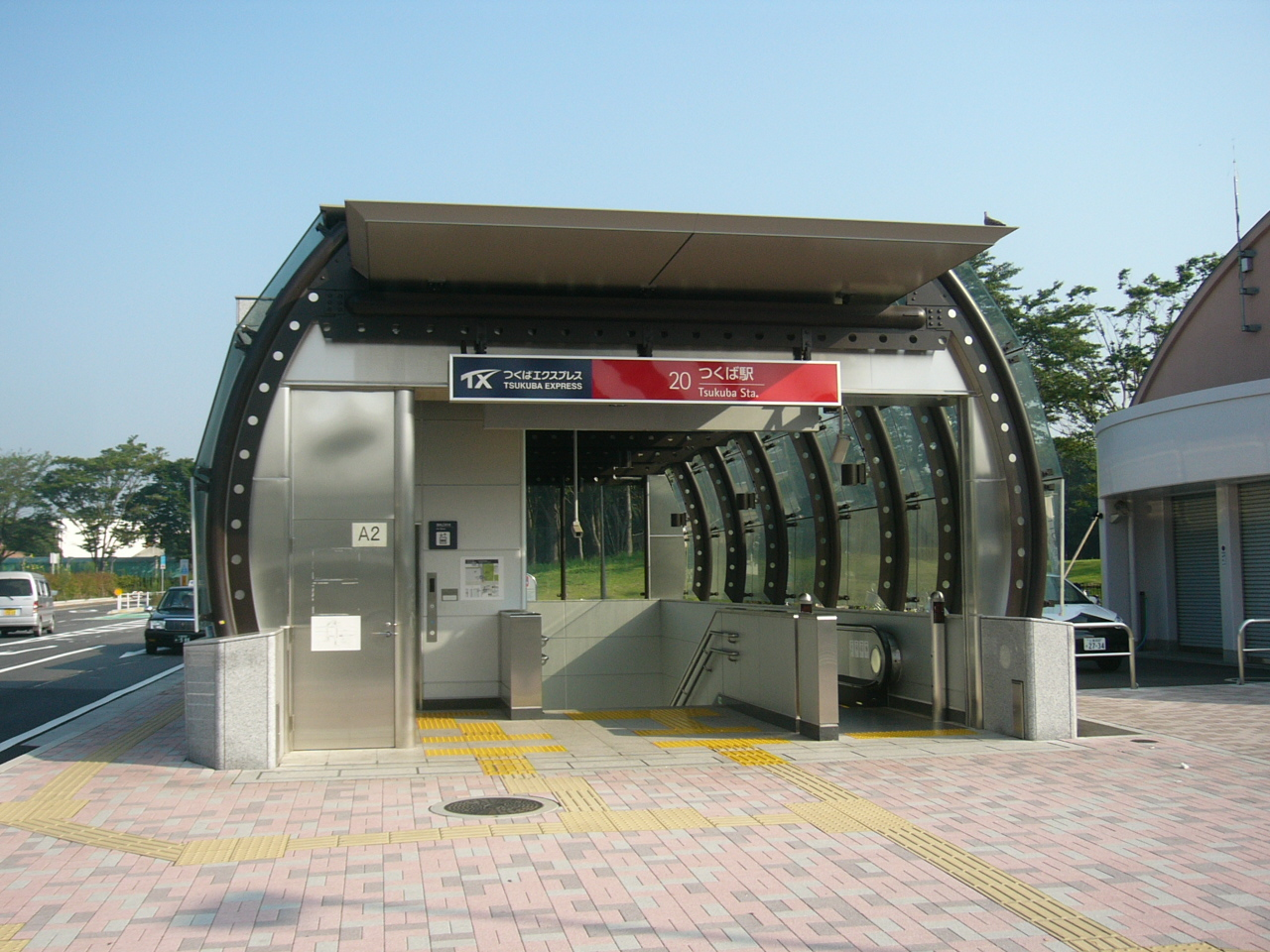
- Entrance A2 of Tsukuba Station in August 2006

General information
- Location: 2-128 Azuma, Tsukuba-shi, Ibaraki-she 305-0031; Japan
- Coordinates: 36°4′57.64″N 140°6′40.69″E
- Operator: Metropolitan Intercity Railway Company
- Line: Tsukuba Express
- Distance: 58.3 km from Akihabara
- Platforms: 2 (1 island platform)
- Tracks: 2
- Connections: Bus stop

Other information
- Status: Staffed
- Station code: TX20
- Website: Official website

History
- Opened: 24 August 2005

Passengers
- FY2023: 17,273 daily

Services
Preceding station	Tsukuba Express	Following station
Moriya (TX15) towards Akihabara	Tsukuba Express Rapid	Terminus
Kenkyū-gakuen (TX19) towards Akihabara	Tsukuba Express Commuter-Rapid Semi-Rapid Local	Terminus
Location
- Location within Ibaraki Prefecture Location within Japan

Tsukuba Station (Japanese: つくば駅, Hepburn: Tsukuba-eki) is a passenger railway station in the city of Tsukuba, Ibaraki, Japan, operated by the third-sector railway operating company Metropolitan Intercity Railway Company. It is numbered "TX20".

== Lines ==
Tsukuba Station is the northern terminus of the 58.3 km Tsukuba Express line from the opposing terminus at Akihabara Station in Tokyo.

== Station layout ==
The station consists of a single island platform situated underground.

=== Platforms ===
1-2	Tsukuba Express	for Moriya, Minami-Nagareyama, Kita-Senju, and Akihabara

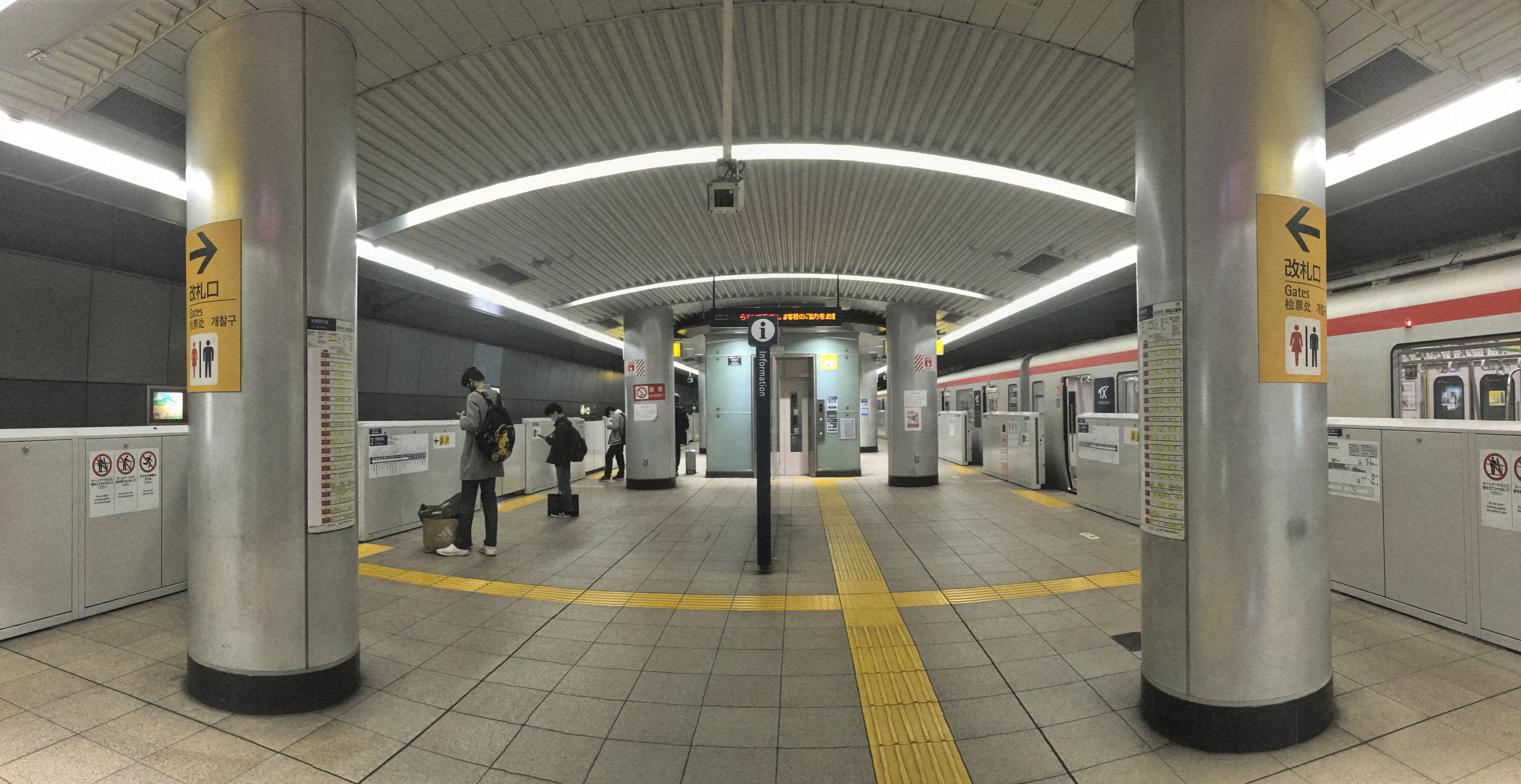
The platforms, 2020

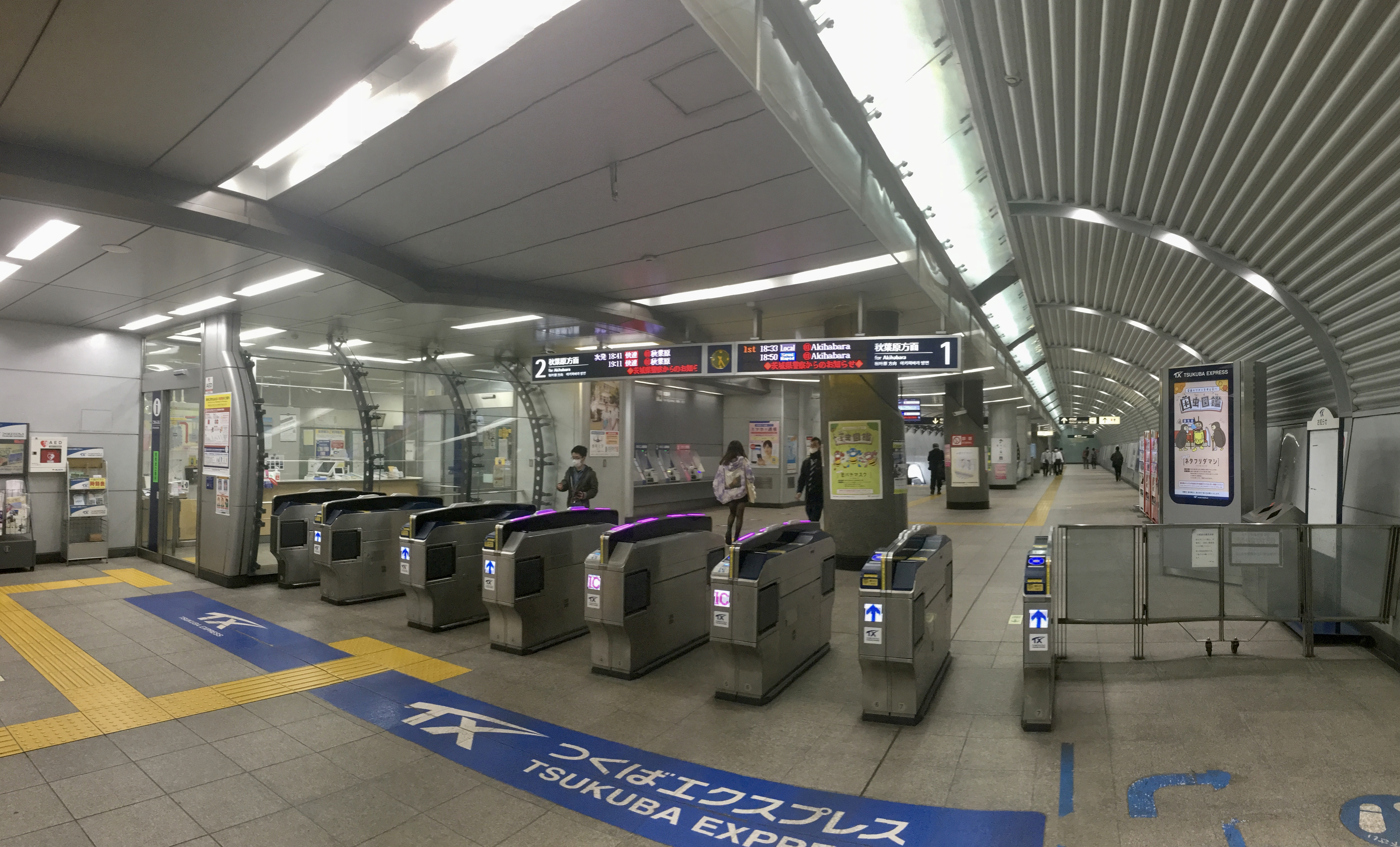
Ticket gates, 2020

== History ==
The railway station opened on 24 August 2005. Tsukuba Center bus terminal existed prior to the railway station opening.

== Passenger statistics ==
In fiscal year 2023, the station was used by an average of 17,273 passengers daily (boarding passengers only).

== Surrounding area ==
The station is located at the heart of the "science city" of Tsukuba. It is also situated near the central bus terminal.

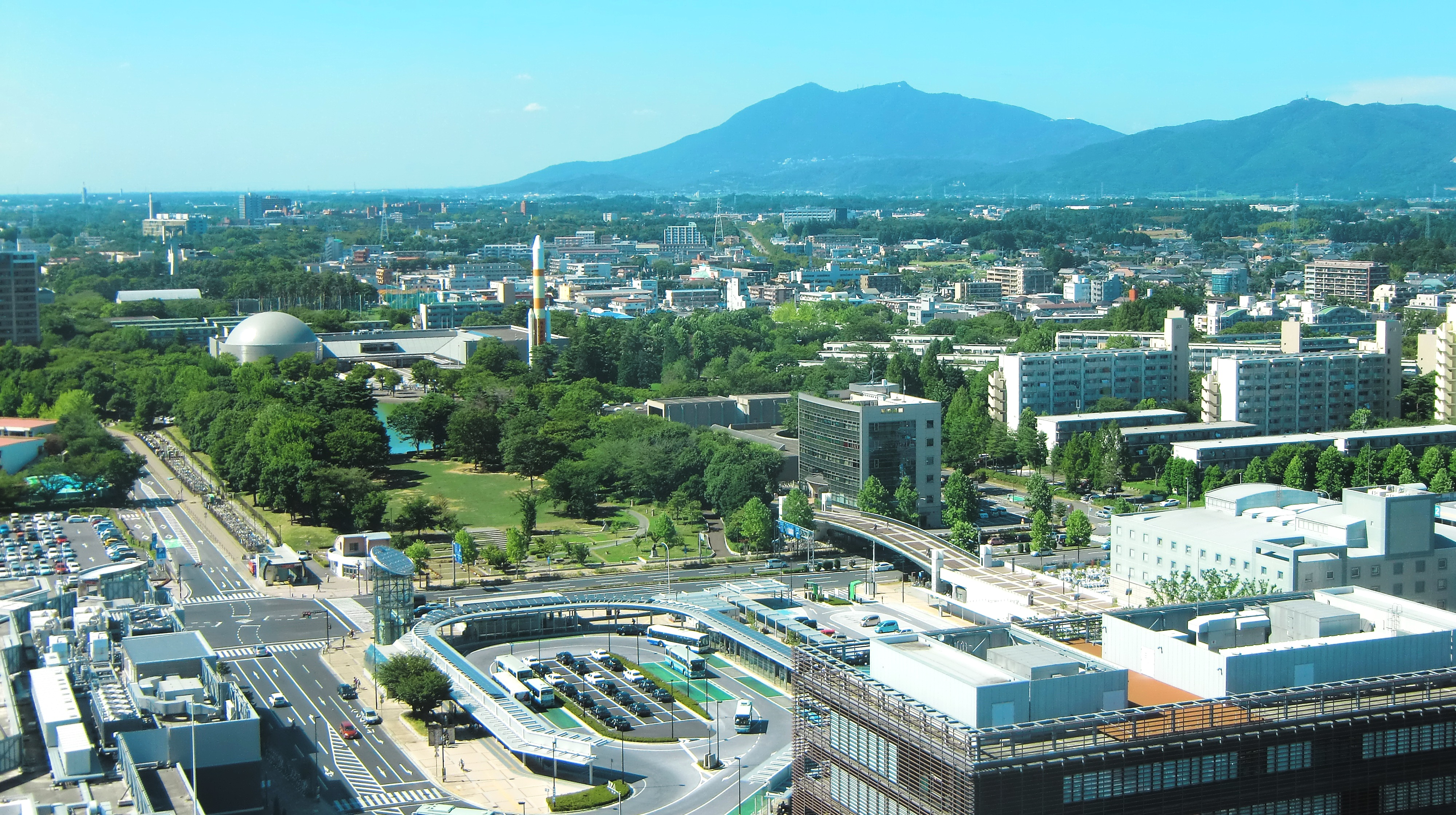
Tsukuba Center and Mount Tsukuba in background

== Bus services ==
Tsukuba Center (つくばセンター, Tsukuba-Sentā) is a bus terminal adjoining Tsukuba Station. It was established as Tsukuba Center Kotsu Hiroba (つくばセンター交通広場) in 1985 for the Expo '85 held in Tsukuba.

Now, there is also a commercial complex named BiVi Tsukuba (ビビつくば) next to the bus terminal. The commercial complex has an information desk operated by Kantō Railway, where tickets can be purchased.

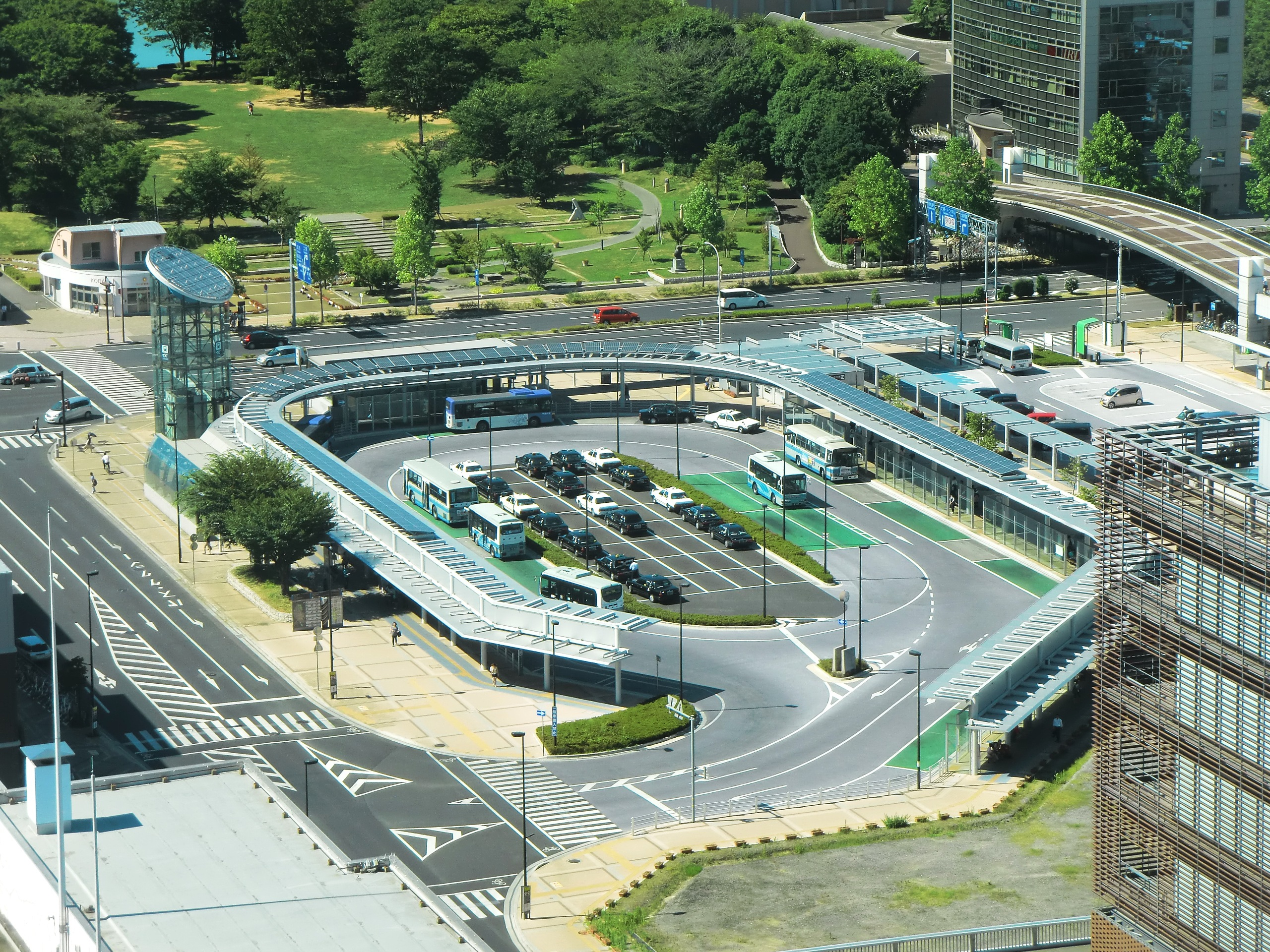
Tsukuba Center, 2012

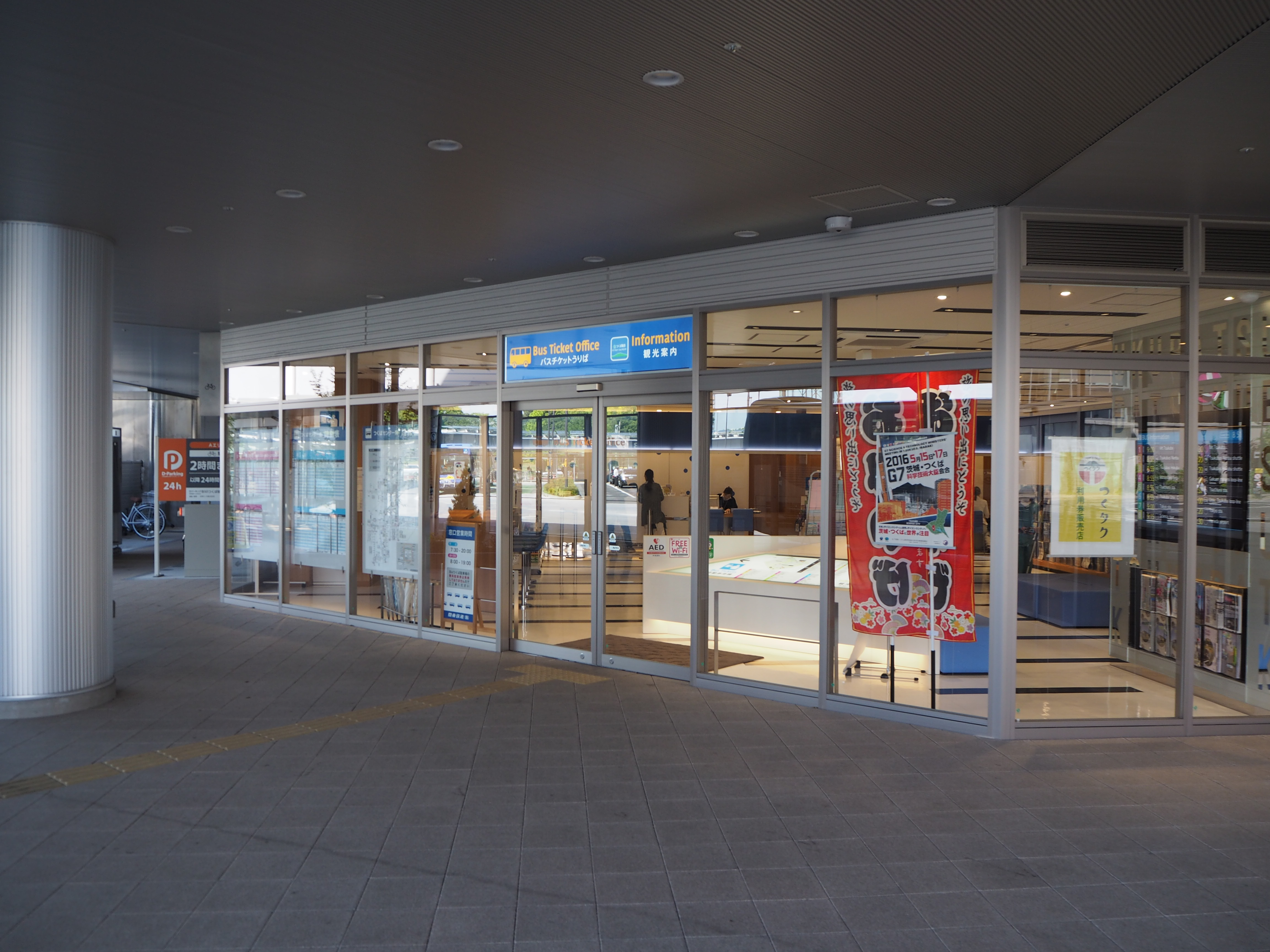
bus ticket office in BiVi Tsukuba, 2015

=== Local bus routes ===
Routes marked with an asterisk * have service on weekdays only.

(Reference:)

Platform No.	Route Name/No.	Via	Destination	Company
1	Tsukubasan Shuttle Bus	Numata, Tsukubasan Jinja iriguchi	Tsutsujigaoka (Mount Tsukuba, aerial lift station)	Kantō Railway; Kantetsu Kankō Bus
2	Kamigō Shuttle (KB)	Kenkyū-gakuen Station, Technopark Toyosato Chuō, Kamigō	Toyosato Hospital	Kantō Railway (Note: entrusted by Tsukuba City)
2	Nambu Shuttle (NB)	Yatabe-shako, RIKEN, Kukizaki Branch Office of Tsukuba City Hall (runs daytime only)	Kukizaki Welfare Support Center (runs daytime only)	Kantō Railway
2	Nambu Shuttle (NB)	Yatabe-shako, RIKEN	Kukizaki Branch Office of Tsukuba City Hall	Kantō Railway
3	Hokubu Shuttle (HB)	Amakubo (Tsukuba Botanical Garden), KEK, Tsukuba Community Center	Tsukuba-san-guchi (foot of Mount Tsukuba)	Kantō Railway
3	Oda Shuttle (OB)	Technopark Sakura, Oda Chūbu	Tsukuba Community Center	Kantō Railway
4	21A, 22*	National Institute for Materials Science, Namiki 2-chōme, (Note: nearest bus stop to AIST Tsukuba Central) Gakuen-Namiki	Arakawaoki Station	Kantō Railway
4	71	Gakuen-Takezono, National Institute for Materials Science, Namiki 2-chōme	Gakuen-Namiki	Kantō Railway
4	C22* (Gakuen-Namiki loop-line)	National Institute for Materials Science, Namiki 2-chōme, Gakuen-Namiki	Tsukuba Center	Kantō Railway
4	31, 31A, 32A*	Ninomiya-chuō, Aeon Mall Tsukuba (Note: some morning buses do not stop at Aeon Mall Tsukuba)	Hitachino-Ushiku Station	Kantō Railway; JR Bus Kanto
4	36*	(non-stop)	Hitachino-Ushiku Station	Kantō Railway
4	CG (Gakuen Minami loop-line, clockwise)	Tsukuba International Congress Center, Namiki 2-chōme, National Institute for Environmental Studies, Meteorological Research Institute	Tsukuba Center	Kantō Railway
4	CG (Gakuen Minami loop-line, counterclockwise)	Tsukuba International Congress Center, Meteorological Research Institute, National Institute for Environmental Studies, Namiki 2-chōme	Tsukuba Center	Kantō Railway
4	C15 (Matsushiro loop-line)	Koike, Teshirogi danchi	Tsukuba Center	Kantō Railway
4	C16*	Koike	Teshirogi danchi	Kantō Railway
4	*	Kasuga 2-chōme	Kenkyū-gakuen Station	Kantō Railway
4	Matsushiro Minami loop-line	Matsunoki-higashi, Matsushiro 5-chōme	Tsukuba Center	Kantō Railway
5	11, 12*	Gakuen-Takezono, Sakuramachi	Tsuchiura Station	Kantō Railway; JR Bus Kanto
5	11, 12*	Gakuen-Takezono, Sakuramachi, Tsuchiura Station	Tsuchiura-shako	Kantō Railway
5	11B, 19	Gakuen-Takezono, Tsuchiura Second High School, Kijō Koen mae (Tsuchiura Castle)	Tsuchiura Station	Kantō Railway
5	*	Gakuen-Takezono, Tsuchiura Second High School	Tsuchiura First High School	Kantō Railway
5	*	(boarding-only up to the final stop)	Tsuchiura First High School	Kantō Railway
5		Gakuen-Takezono (no service on holidays)	Godō-chōsha (no service on holidays)	Kantō Railway
5	11D*	Noda Danchi, Sakuramachi	Tsuchiura Station	Kantō Railway
5	18*	Tanakachō	Tsuchiura Station higashi-guchi	Kantō Railway
5	18*, C8*	Tsukuba Botanical Garden, NIED, KEK	Tsukuba Techno-Park Ōho	Kantō Railway
5	C8A*	Tsukuba Botanical Garden, Gasshukujo, NIED, KEK	Tsukuba Techno-Park Ōho	Kantō Railway
5	26*, 36*, C6*	Kasuga 1-chōme, GSI, Public Works Research Institute	Architecture and Building Research Institute	Kantō Railway
5	12*, 22*, 32A*	University of Tsukuba Kasuga area	University of Tsukuba Hospital	Kantō Railway
5	19	University of Tsukuba Hospital, Kamigō	Ishige Station	Kantō Railway
5	71	University of Tsukuba Hospital, GSI, Public Works Research Institute, KEK	Shimotsuma Station	Kantō Railway
5	71A	University of Tsukuba Hospital, GSI, Public Works Research Institute	National Institute for School Teachers and Staff Development	Kantō Railway
6	C10 (University Tsukuba loop-line, clockwise)	University of Tsukuba Tsukuba Campus	Tsukuba Center	Kantō Railway
6	C10 (University Tsukuba loop-line, counterclockwise)	University of Tsukuba Tsukuba Campus	Tsukuba Center	Kantō Railway
8	Tsukuba Science Tour Bus (north route)	GSI, Tsukuba Botanical Garden (no survice on weekdays)	Tsukuba Center (no survice on weekdays)	Kantō Railway
8	Tsukuba Science Tour Bus (south route)	Tsukuba Expo Center, National Institute of Advanced Industrial Science and Technology, Tsukuba Space Center (no survice on weekdays)	Tsukuba Center (no survice on weekdays)	Kantō Railway
8		Kenkyū-gakuen Station, Goodman Jōso	Roadside Station Jōso	Kantō Railway

=== Highway bus routes ===
(Reference:)

Platform No.	Route Name	Via	Destination	Company
7	Tsukuba	Yashio Parking Area (Shuto Expressway Misato Route)	Tokyo Station	Kantō Railway
8	Airport Liner "NATT'S"	(boarding-only up to the airport)	Narita International Airport	Kantō Railway; Chiba Kōtsū; Narita Airport Transport
8		(boarding-only up to the airport)	Haneda Airport	Kantō Railway
8	TM Liner	Weekdays: Ishioka (Jōban Expressway), Ibaraki Prefectural Government Building	Mito Station minami-guchi	Kantō Railway
8	TM Liner	Holidays: Ishioka (Jōban Expressway), Akatsuka Station kita-guchi, Mito Station kita-guchi	Mito Station minami-guchi	Kantō Railway
8		Tokyo DisneySea	Tokyo Disneyland	Kantō Railway
8	Yokappe Kansai (overnight bus)	Kyōto Station, Ōsaka Station, Osaka City Air Terminal	Universal Studios Japan	Kantō Railway; Kintetsu Bus

== See also ==
- List of railway stations in Japan
