= Hitachi A-train =

Family of rail rolling stock manufactured by Hitachi

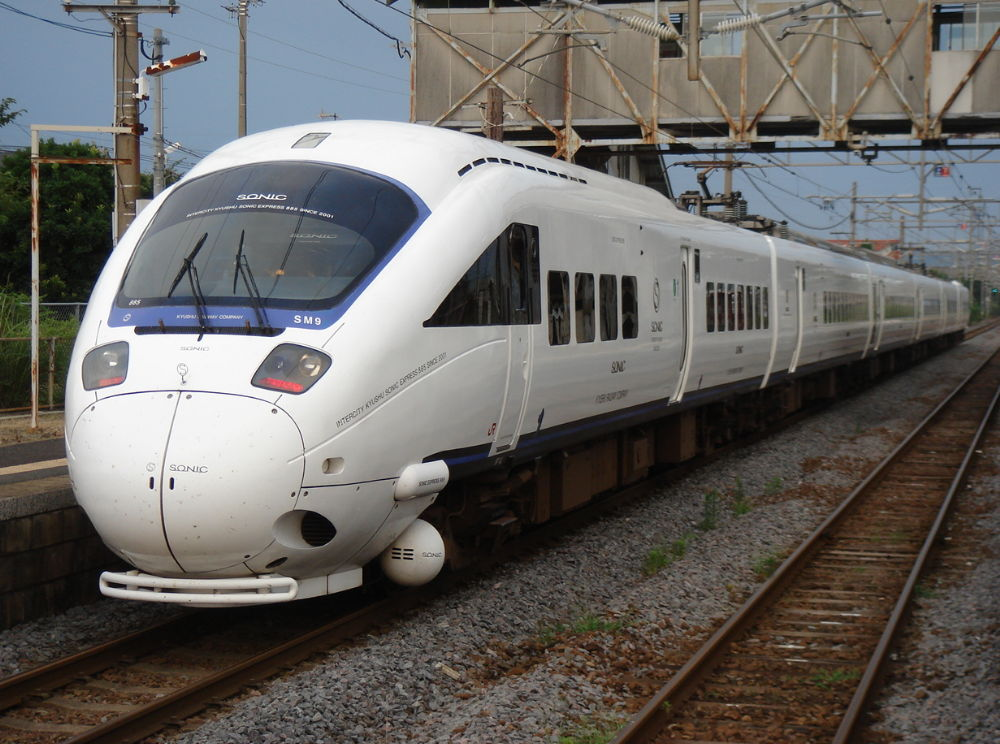
JR Kyushu 885 series White Sonic EMU

The Hitachi A-train is a family of rail rolling stock built and designed by Hitachi Rail using a common base and construction techniques. The stock is designed to facilitate a number of product life-cycle improvements including ease of manufacture, increased energy efficiency, and recyclability.

== Description ==
The "A-train" design concept includes several elements. The primary feature is that vehicle car bodies are constructed from double skin aluminium extruded sections, which are friction stir welded, creating a strong body. Other features include hollow, extruded mounting rails on the vehicle body to which modular components are attached.

Initially the A-train family consisted of multiple units designed and built by Hitachi, for use on the railway system in Japan. It comprises trains for both commuter and limited express services. The modular design enables both production and refurbishment to be undertaken faster. Due to the low heat input of friction stir welding, high strength, excellent crashworthiness and minimal distortion can be achieved.

== Japanese trains ==
Hitachi has provided a number of trains based on the A-train concept for use in Japan:

- E257 series – a limited express EMU operated by the East Japan Railway Company (JR East)
- 815 series – a commuter EMU operated by the Kyushu Railway Company (JR Kyushu) and the first A-train type to enter service
- 817 series – a commuter EMU operated by the Kyushu Railway Company (JR Kyushu)
- 683 series – a limited express EMU operated on the Hokuriku Main Line by the West Japan Railway Company (JR West)
  - 289 series – limited express EMU converted from surplus 683 series sets
- 883-1000 series – additional cars built to augment existing 883 series Sonic EMUs operated by the Kyushu Railway Company (JR Kyushu)
- 885 series – a limited express EMU operated by the Kyushu Railway Company (JR Kyushu)
- Fukuoka Subway 3000 series – an EMU type operated on Fukuoka City Subway's Nanakuma Line
- Hankyu 9000 series – a commuter EMU operated by Hankyu Railway
- Hankyu 9300 series – a commuter EMU operated by Hankyu Railway
- Seibu 20000 series – a commuter EMU operated by the Seibu Railway
- Seibu 30000 series – a commuter EMU operated by the Seibu Railway
- Tobu 50000 series – a commuter EMU operated by the Tobu Railway
- Tokyo Metro 05 series – an EMU type operated on the Tokyo Metro Tōzai Line and later KRL Commuterline
- Tokyo Metro 10000 series – an EMU type operated on the Tokyo Metro Fukutoshin Line and Tokyo Metro Yūrakuchō Line
- Tokyo Metro 15000 series – an EMU type operated on the Tokyo Metro Tōzai Line
- Tokyo Metro 16000 series – an EMU type operated on the Tokyo Metro Chiyoda Line built in cooperation with Kawasaki
- Tokyo Metro 17000 series – an EMU type operated on the Tokyo Metro Yūrakuchō Line and Tokyo Metro Fukutoshin Line
- Tokyo Metro 18000 series – an EMU type operated on the Tokyo Metro Hanzōmon Line
- Tōyō Rapid 2000 series – a commuter EMU operated by the Tōyō Rapid Railway Line
- TX-1000 series – a commuter EMU operated by the Metropolitan Intercity Railway Company on Tsukuba Express services, built by Kawasaki to A-train specifications
- TX-2000 series – a commuter EMU operated by the Metropolitan Intercity Railway Company on Tsukuba Express services
- Sotetsu 20000 and 21000 series – a commuter EMU operated by the Sagami Railway

== A-train family overseas ==
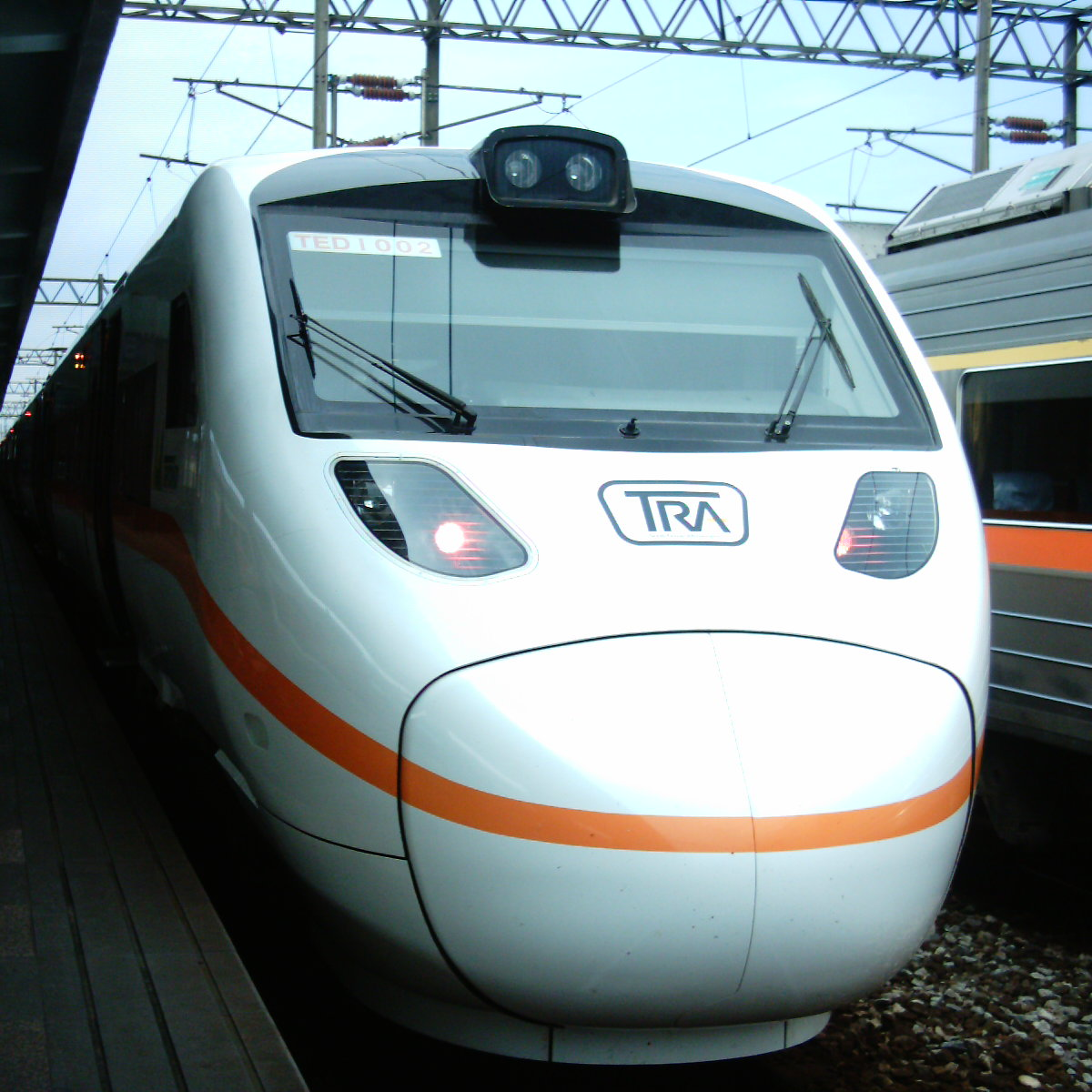
TEMU1000 at Hualien station, Taiwan, 2008

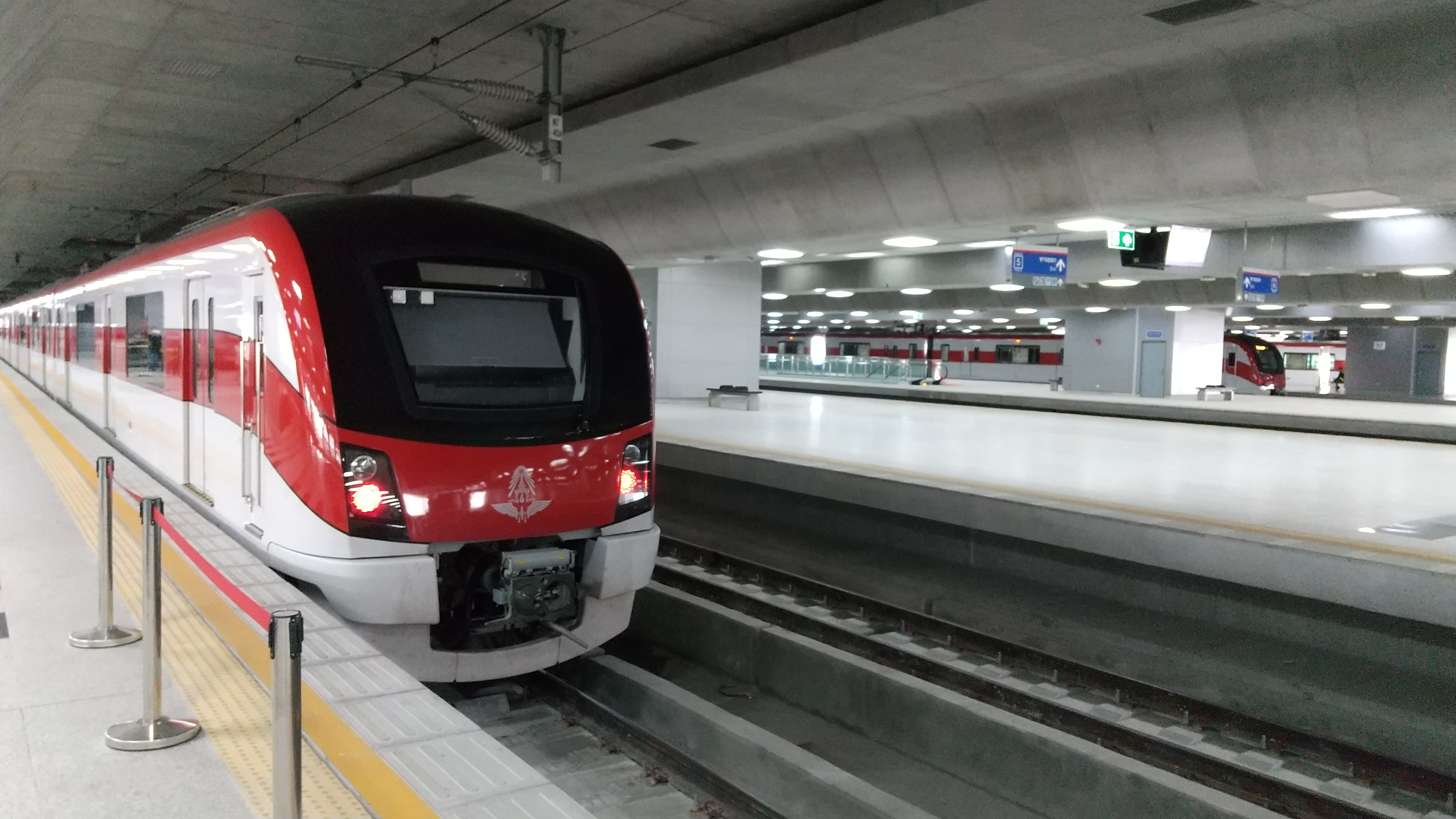
The SRT Dark Red Line at Krung Thep Aphiwat Station

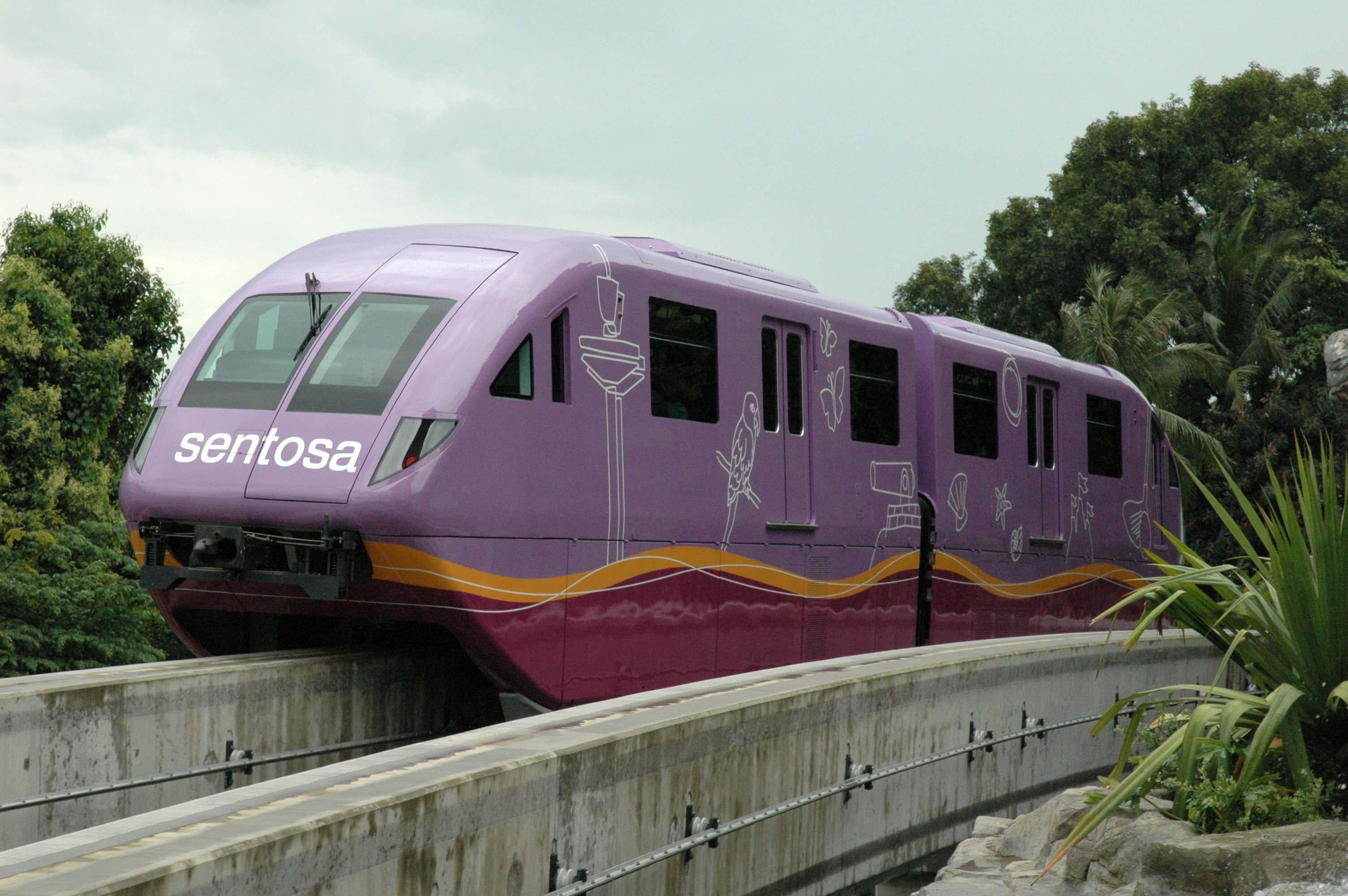
The Sentosa Express monorail in Singapore uses A-Train derived monorail cars

For their products overseas, the Hitachi A-train has different designations by Hitachi depending on their type.

- AT100 = high-density urban trains
- AT200 = suburban, commuter and regional trains.
- AT300 = intercity high speed and long-distance trains
- AT400 = high-speed 'bullet' trains

Hitachi have been marketing the A-train family overseas. Both the Chongqing Monorail in China and the Sentosa Express Monorail in Singapore utilise A-train derived cars.

In 2005 Hitachi received an order from Taiwan Railway Administration (TRA) for six 8-car trains, based on the Japanese 885 series, designated as TEMU1000, for operation on the main line between Taipei and Hualien. Deliveries of the trains began in late 2006, with the first public test of the new trains in March 2007. Two more sets were purchased in December 2014, and delivered in early 2016.

In 2007, Korail ordered eight 4-car express trains branded as the Trunk-Line Electric Car (TEC) to Hitachi. The car bodies, bogies and power systems were made in Japan, but were assembled at SLS Heavy Industry in Changwon, Korea. A significant number of the components were replaced by Korean parts. The trains were for deployment on "Rapid Train" services on the Gyeongbu Line and Janghang Line between Seoul Station and Sinchang station, branded Nuriro and with a maximum speed of 150 km/h (93 mph).

In 2018, the Taiwan Railway Administration placed a new order for 50 12-car EMU3000 series sets, to be delivered between 2021 and 2024. The first set was delivered on July 31, 2021, with service entry scheduled for the end of the year.

Between 2019 and 2021, the first Hitachi AT100 units arrived in Bangkok for the SRT Dark Red Line and SRT Light Red Line, which opened on 2 August 2021. These trains are coloured red, and are very reminiscent of a typical Japanese commuter train. 15 units form 6-car sets, while 10 form 4-car sets.

=== United Kingdom ===
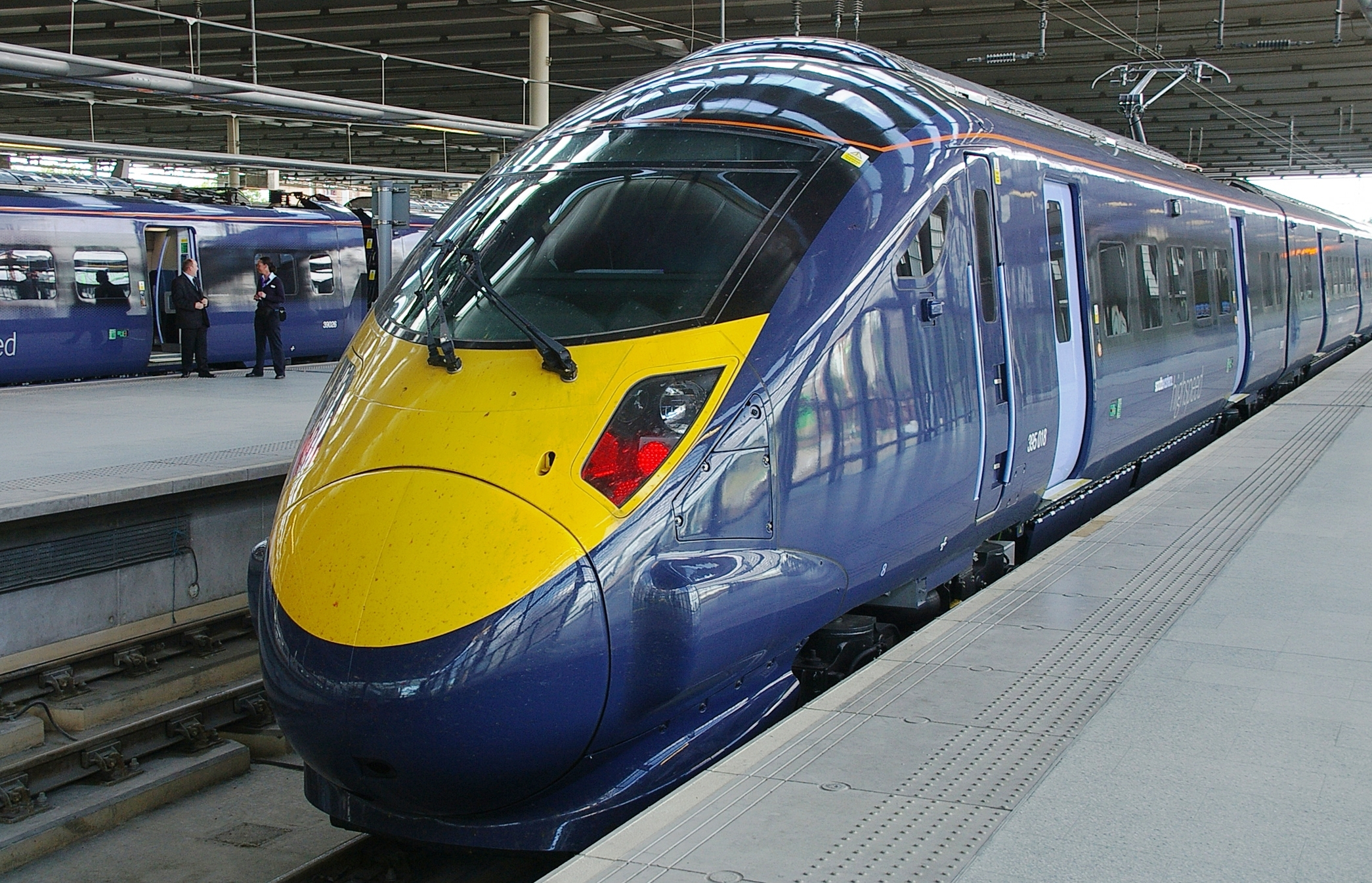
Class 395 at St Pancras in 2009

The United Kingdom became the first country outside Japan to place a major conventional rail order for Hitachi when Southeastern ordered 29 electric multiple units for use on domestic services on the High Speed 1 line. These are designated as Class 395 units, which are standard gauge with the ability to operate at speeds of up to 225 km/h (140 mph). Southeastern branded these trains as the Javelin, a reference to the 2012 Summer Olympics. These would become the first Hitachi AT300 trains in use in the United Kingdom, and can run at full speed on either AC overhead electrification or at a restricted top speed of 100 mph (160 km/h) on DC third rail electrification.

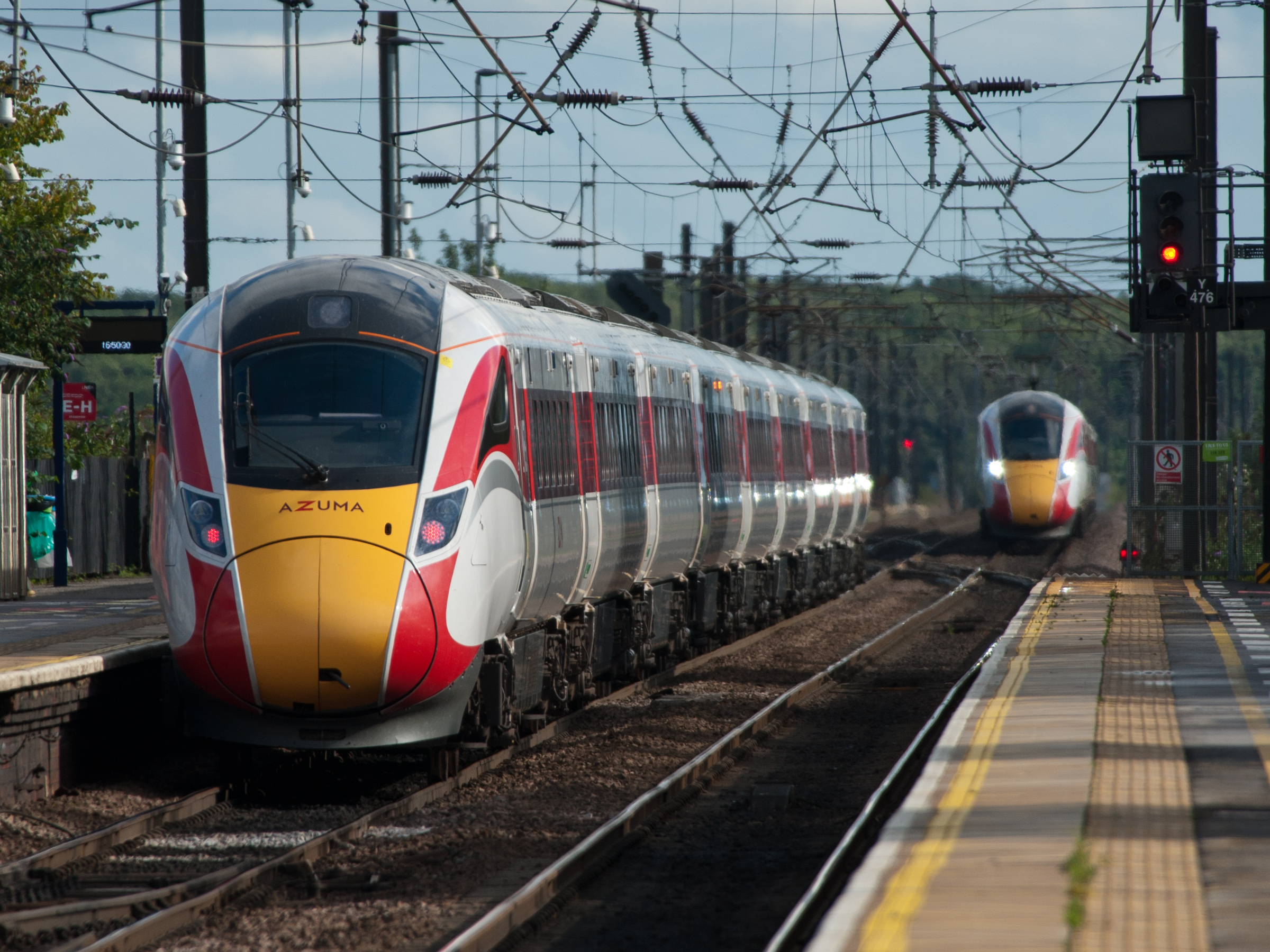
Two LNER Class 801 units passing at Northallerton in 2020

Hitachi gained further ground in the UK market when it was announced in 2009 that an A-train based design similar to that of the Class 395, initially named the Hitachi Super Express, was the preference for the government's Intercity Express Programme (IEP) tender to replace InterCity 125 and InterCity 225 sets on the Great Western Main Line (GWML) and East Coast Main Line (ECML). Like the Class 395s, these units were part of the AT300 family. These units are classified as Class 800 bi-mode multiple units (BMUs), which can be powered by both AC overhead wires and underfloor diesel generators. The GWML and ECML franchise holders then further invested in electric-only Class 801 units for services on electrified routes. The Class 800's specification allows for its conversion to a Class 801, as it is assumed that electrification will continue to expand.

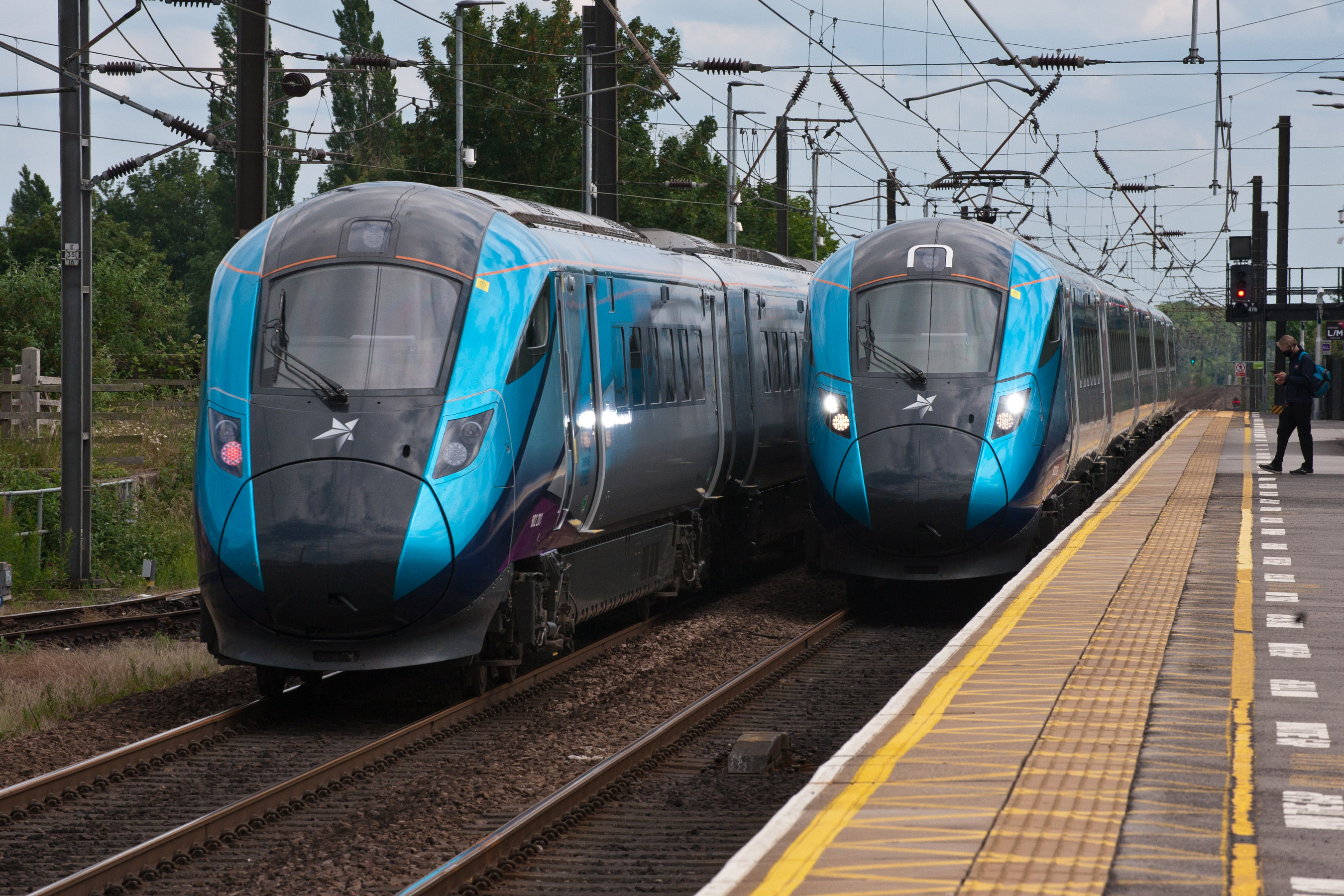
Two TransPennine Express Class 802s

The choice of Hitachi units for the IEP was controversial, as it would see little final manufacturing in the UK in comparison to the foreign-owned but domestically manufactured Bombardier option, leading to a campaign to reverse the decision. However, it was economics that became a sticking point, with the weight of the Bombardier design creeping up. The decision was postponed due to the difficulty of government borrowing.

After winning the franchise, Abellio ScotRail announced they would purchase Hitachi AT200 trains for their commuter services, the first order for the family. The trains were designated as the Class 385 and were introduced in 2018, before being withdrawn and reintroduced in 2019.

Through the IEP and related orders, the number of AT300 units has grown from 29 to nearly 300 since 2017. The Hitachi Newton Aycliffe factory, which was created to build AT300 units for the IEP, was so busy by 2020 that some Class 802 units had to be manufactured in Italy instead. This has also led to the AT300 being trusted by operators as replacements for their ageing units.
