= TX-3000 series =

Japanese train type

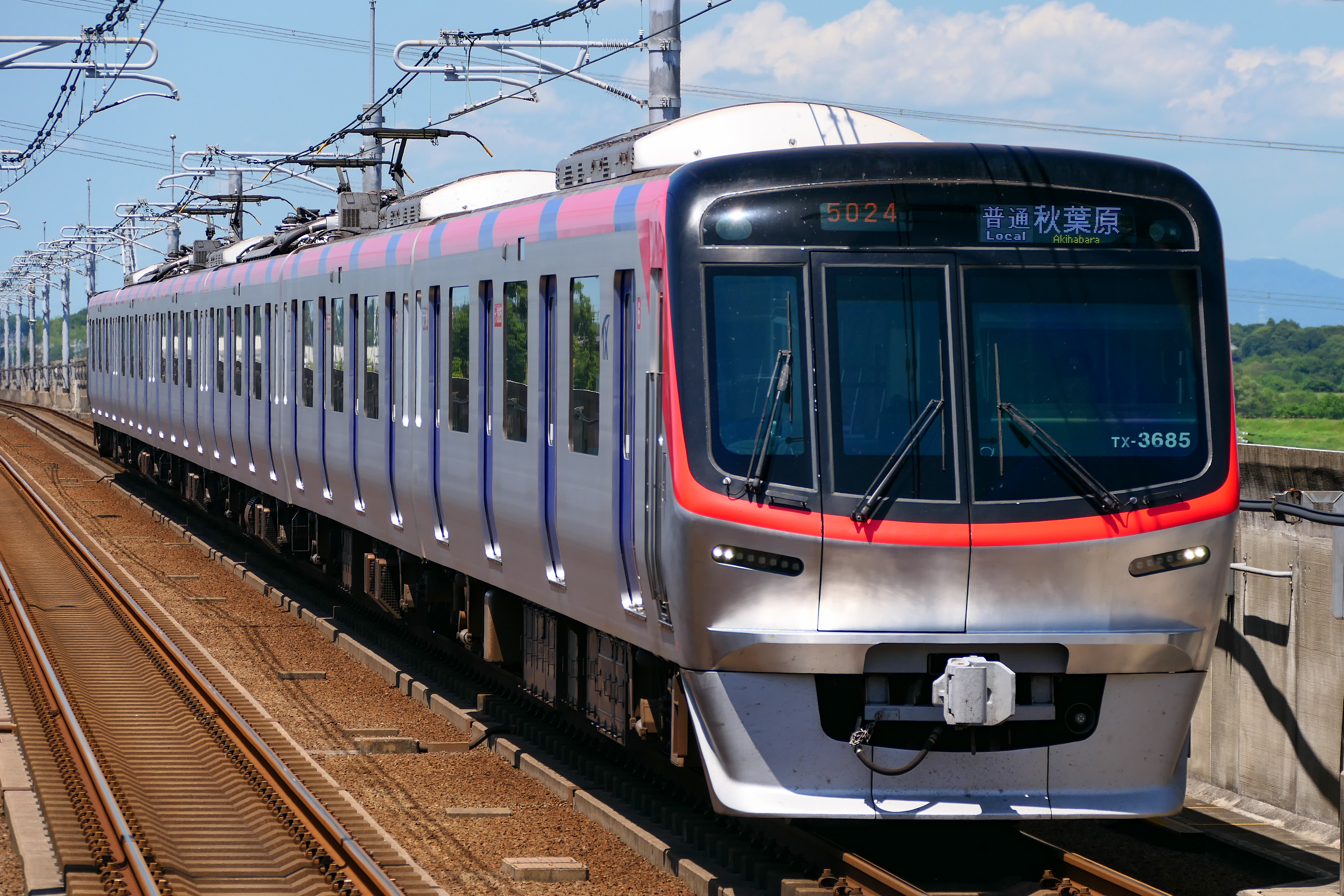
- A TX-3000 series train July 2023
- In service: 2020–present
- Manufacturer: Hitachi Rail
- Entered service: 14 March 2020
- Number built: 30 vehicles (5 sets)
- Formation: 6 cars per trainset
- Operators: Metropolitan Intercity Railway Company
- Lines served: Tsukuba Express

Specifications
- Car body construction: Aluminium
- Car length: 20.000 m (65 ft 7 in); 20.800 m (68 ft 3 in) (end cars)
- Width: 2.930 m (9 ft 7 in)
- Maximum speed: 130 km/h (81 mph)
- Electric system(s): 1,500 V DC / 20 kV 50 Hz AC (overhead catenary)
- Current collector(s): Pantograph
- Track gauge: 1,067 mm (3 ft 6 in)

The TX-3000 series (TX-3000系) is a dual-voltage electric multiple unit (EMU) train type operated by the Metropolitan Intercity Railway Company on the Tsukuba Express line in the Kanto region of Japan.

== Formation ==
The trains are formed as six-car sets. They are prepared for a possible lengthening to eight cars per set.

Sets are formed as follows with car 1 at the Tsukuba (northern) end.

Car No.	1	2	3	4	5	6
Designation	CT1	M1	M2	M1'	M2'	CT2
Numbering	3100	3200	3300	3400	3500	3600

== Interior ==
Seating accommodation consists of longitudinal seating, with priority seating sections. The interior features passenger information displays and security cameras.

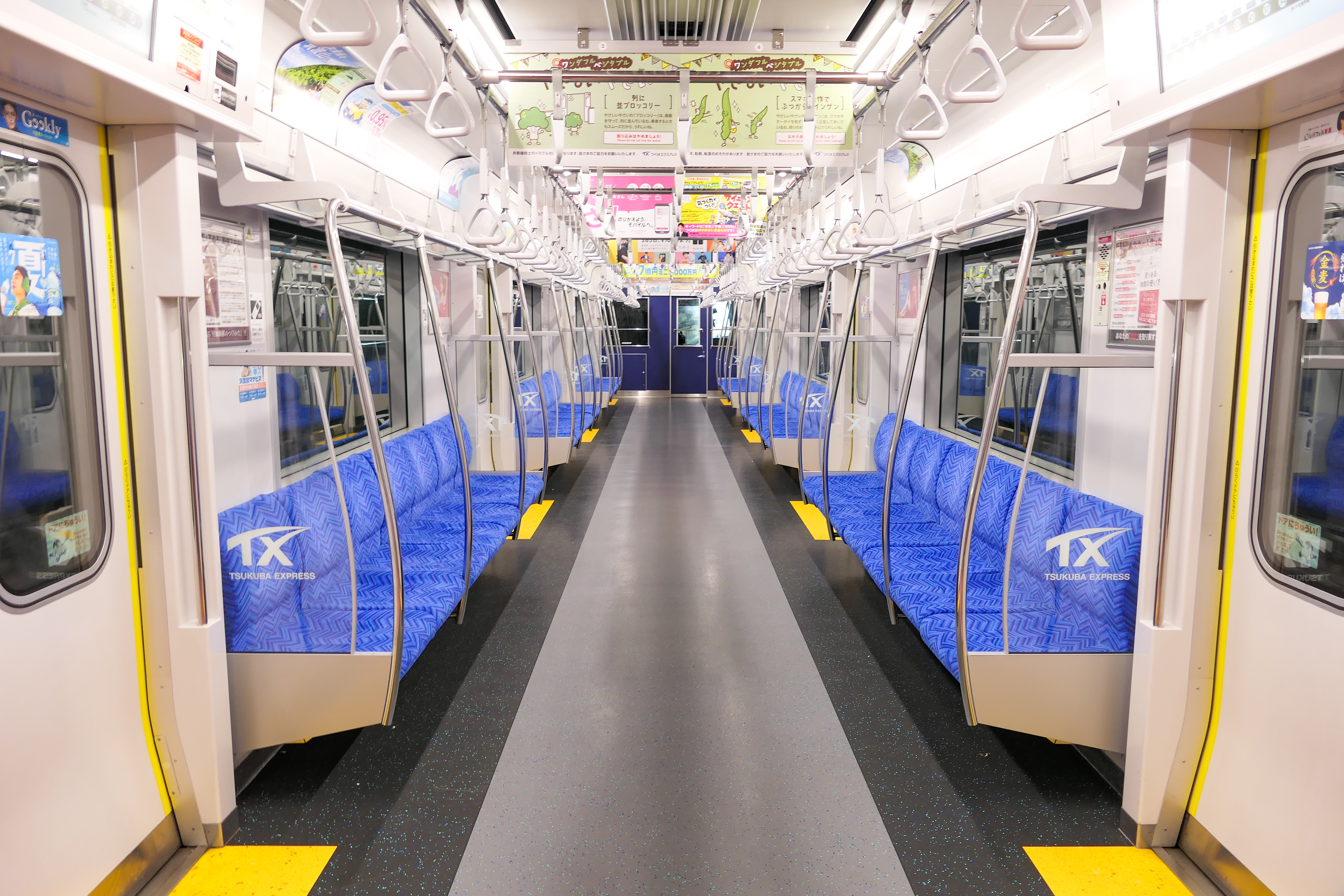
Interior

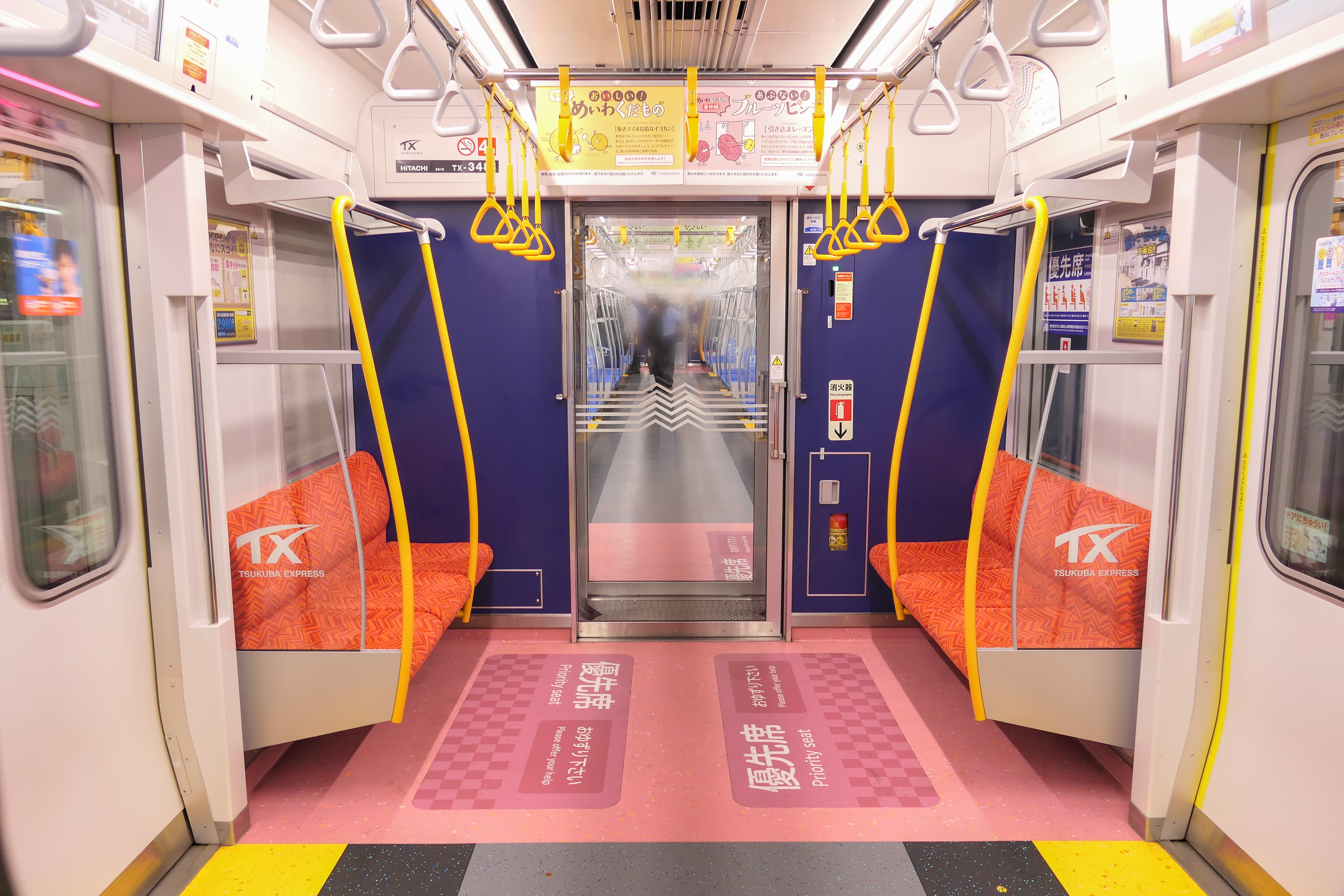
Priority seating

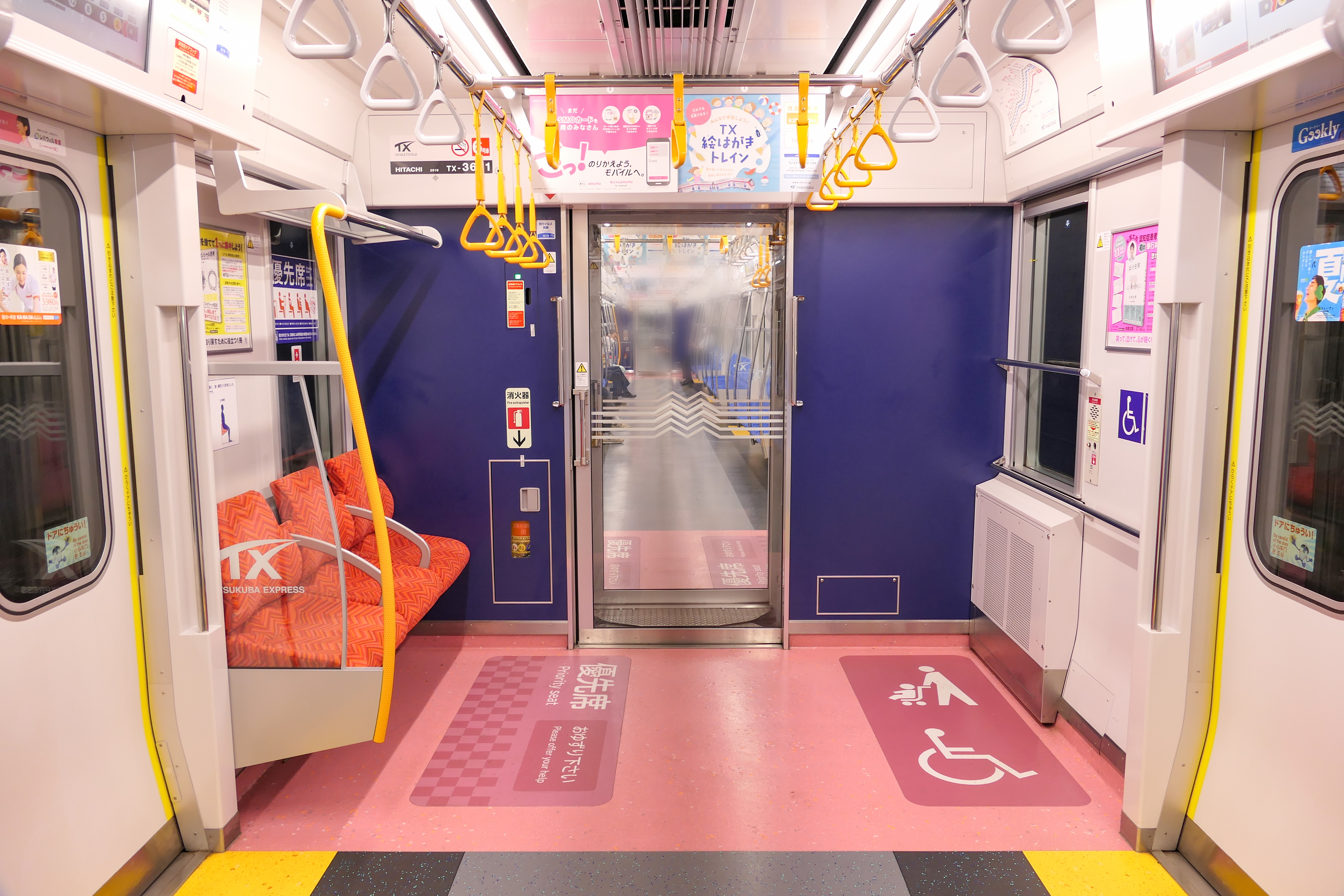
Priority seating with free space

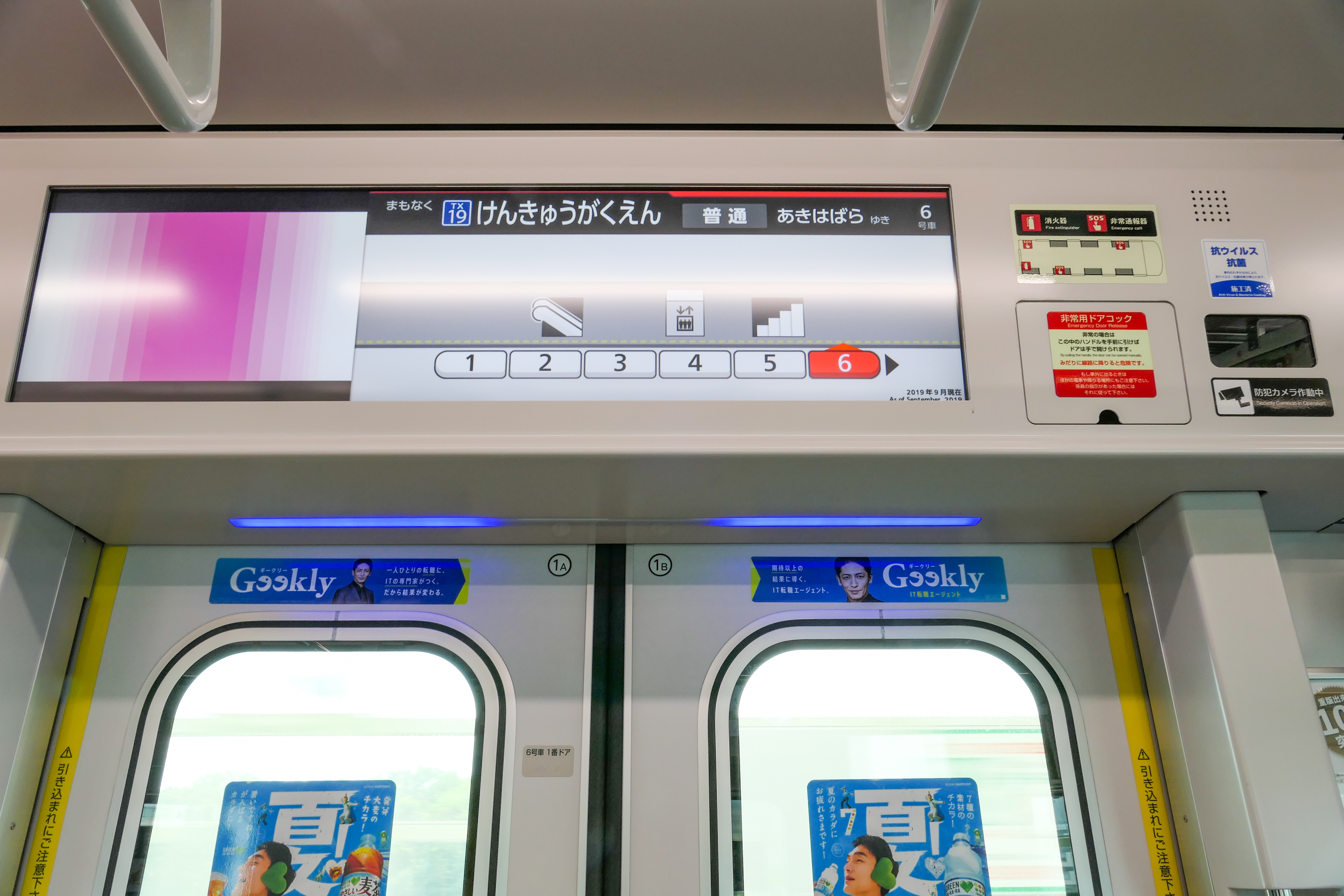
LCD information display

== Technical specifications ==
The trains use SiC-VVVF technology. They have aluminium car bodies and bolsterless bogies.

== History ==
Five six-car sets were ordered in June 2018. The first set was delivered in September 2019, with the remaining sets to be delivered in December 2019 and January 2020. A second set was delivered in December 2019. Two further sets were delivered in January 2020. A fifth set was delivered in March 2020.

The type entered service on 14 March 2020.

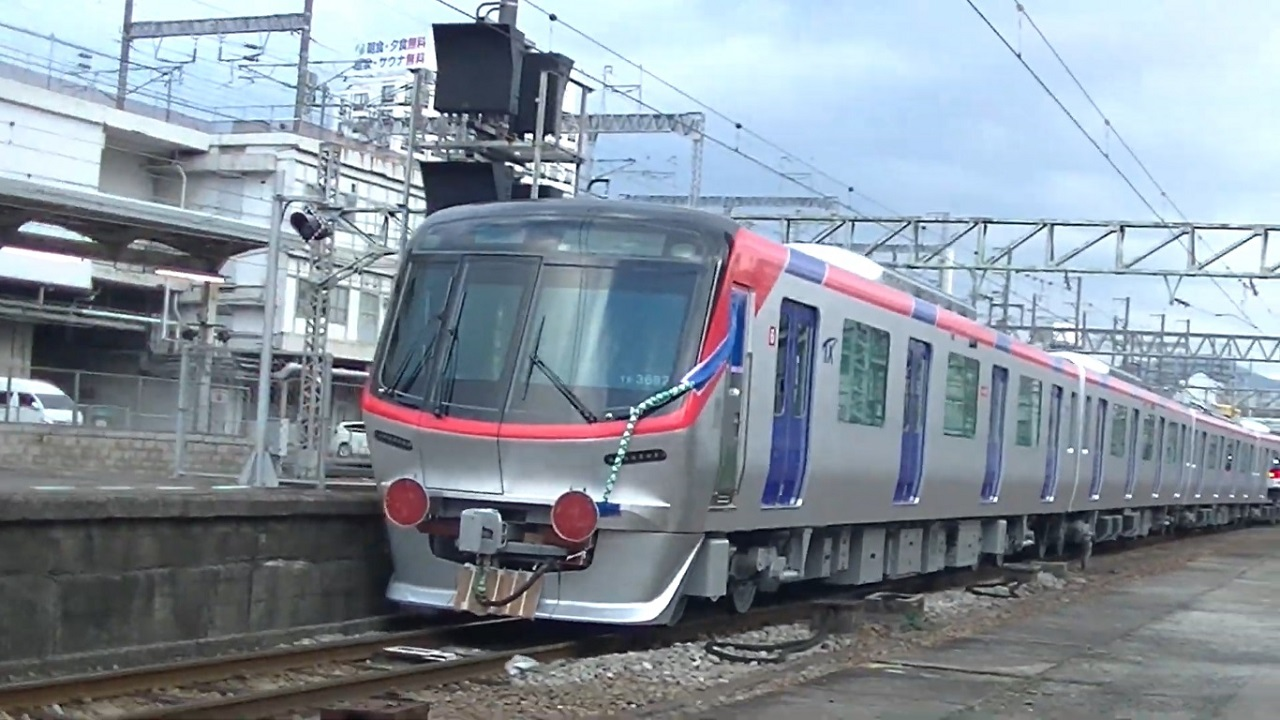
A TX-3000 series train on delivery in December 2019
