= Misato-chūō Station =

Railway station in Misato, Saitama Prefecture, Japan

Misato-chūō Station 三郷中央駅
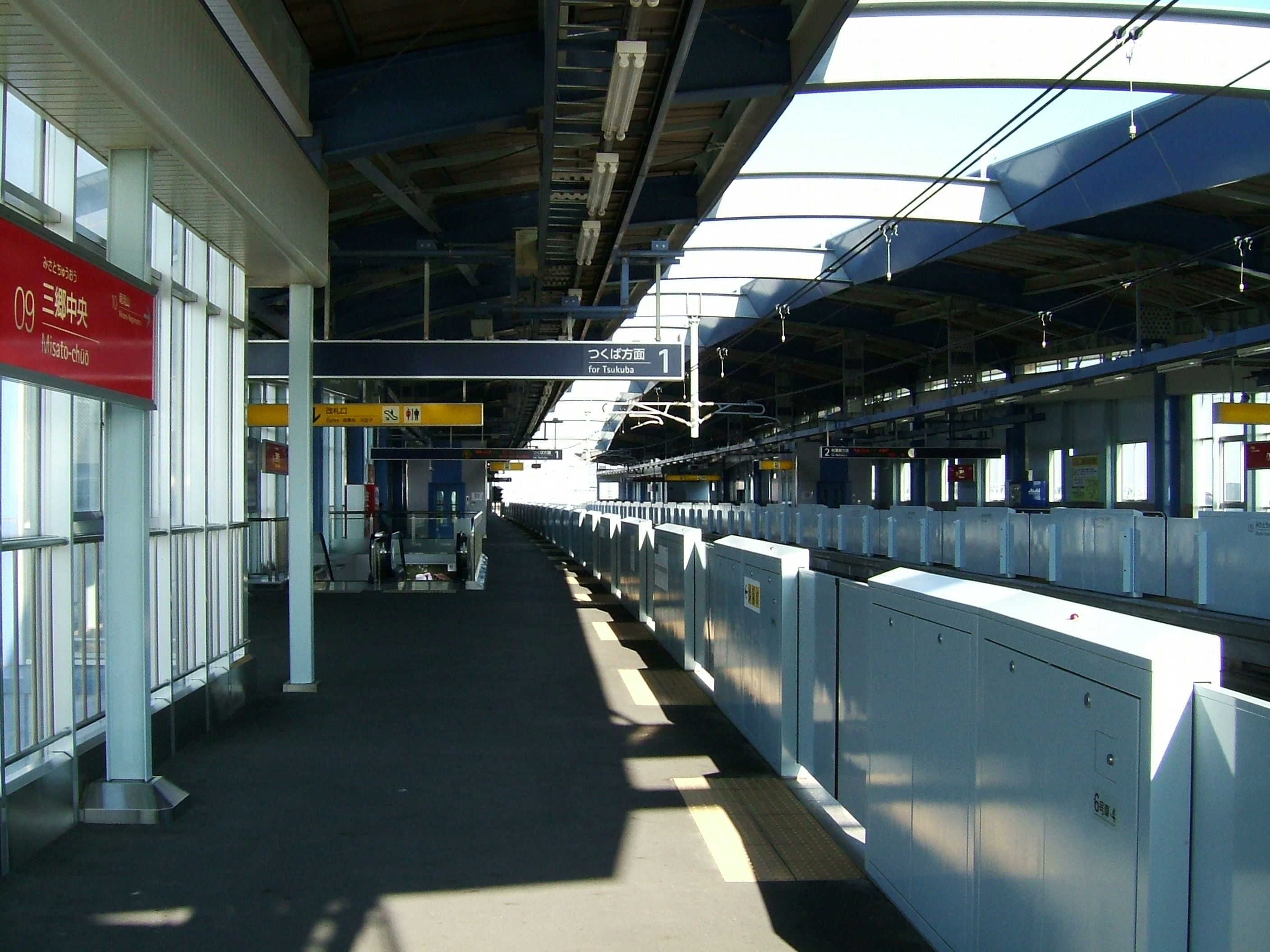
- Platform level of Misato-chūō Station.

General information
- Location: 1-1-1 Chuo, Misato-shi, Saitama-ken 341-0038; Japan
- Coordinates: 35°49′27.66″N 139°52′41.51″E
- Operator: Metropolitan Intercity Railway Company
- Line: ■ Tsukuba Express
- Distance: 19.3 km from Akihabara
- Platforms: 2 (2 side platforms)

Construction
- Structure type: Elevated
- Accessible: Yes

Other information
- Status: Staffed
- Station code: TX09

History
- Opened: 24 August 2005

Passengers
- FY2019: 15413

Services
| Preceding station | Tsukuba Express | Following station |
|---|---|---|
| Yashio (TX08) towards Akihabara | Tsukuba Express Semi-Rapid Local | Minami-Nagareyama (TX10) towards Tsukuba |
Location
- Location within Saitama Prefecture Location within Japan

Misato-chūō Station (三郷中央駅, Misato-chūō-eki) is a passenger railway station located in the city of Misato, Saitama Prefecture, Japan operated by the third-sector railway operating company Metropolitan Intercity Railway Company. The station is numbered TX09.

== Lines ==
Misato-chūō Station is served by the Tsukuba Express, and is located 19.3 kilometers (12.0 mi) from the terminus of the line at Akihabara.

== Station layout ==
The station consists of two elevated opposed side platforms with the station building located underneath.

=== Platforms ===
| 1 | ■ Tsukuba Express | for Tsukuba |
| 2 | ■ Tsukuba Express | for Akihabara |

== History ==
The station opened on 24 August 2005, coinciding with the opening of the Tsukuba Express line.

== Passenger statistics ==
In fiscal 2019, the station was used by 15,413 passengers (boarding passengers only).

== Surrounding area ==
- Misato Central General Hospital
- Odori Park
- Misato City Fire Department
- Misato Post Office
- Misato City Shinwa Elementary School

== See also ==
- List of railway stations in Japan
