= TX-2000 series =

Japanese train type

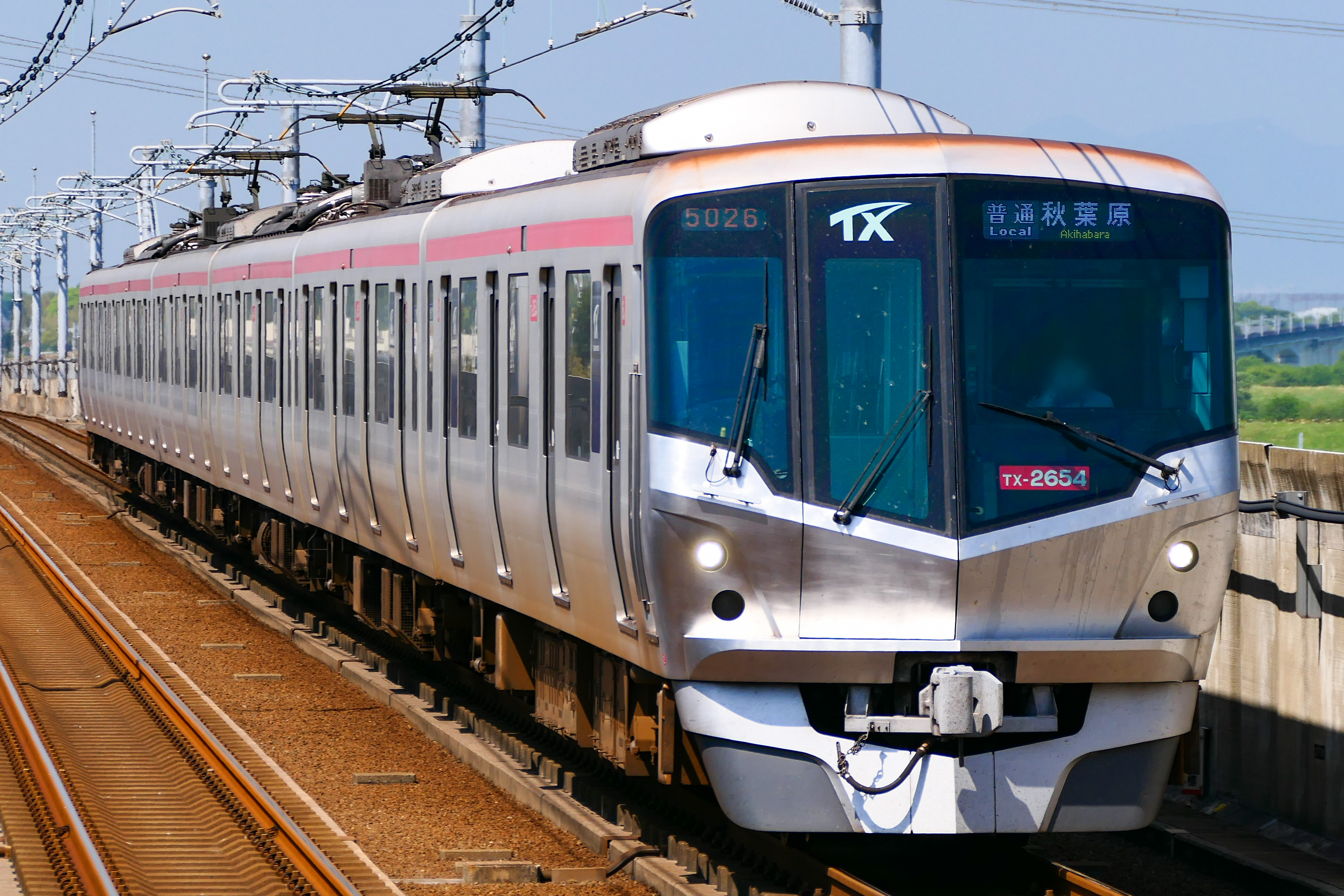
- Tsukuba Express 2000 series
- Manufacturer: Hitachi
- Built at: Kudamatsu, Yamaguchi
- Family name: Hitachi A-train
- Constructed: 2003–2012
- Entered service: 24 August 2005
- Number built: 138 vehicles (23 sets)
- Number in service: 138 vehicles (23 sets)
- Formation: 6 cars per trainset
- Fleet numbers: 51–73
- Capacity: 920 (318 seated)
- Operators: Metropolitan Intercity Railway Company
- Depots: Moriya
- Lines served: Tsukuba Express

Specifications
- Car body construction: Aluminium
- Car length: 20,800 mm (68 ft 3 in) (end cars); 20,000 mm (65 ft 7 in) (intermediate cars)
- Width: 2,950 mm (9 ft 8 in)
- Height: 4,070 mm (13 ft 4 in)
- Doors: 4 pairs per side
- Maximum speed: 130 km/h (81 mph)
- Traction system: PWM-VVVF
- Power output: 190 kW per motor
- Acceleration: 3.0 km/(h⋅s) (1.9 mph/s)
- Deceleration: 4.2 km/(h⋅s) (2.6 mph/s) (service); 4.4 km/(h⋅s) (2.7 mph/s) (emergency)
- Electric system(s): 1,500 V DC / 20 kV 50 Hz AC (overhead wire)
- Current collection: Pantograph
- Safety system(s): ATC, ATO
- Track gauge: 1,067 mm (3 ft 6 in)

The TX-2000 series (TX-2000系) is a dual-voltage electric multiple unit (EMU) train type operated by the Metropolitan Intercity Railway Company on the Tsukuba Express line in the Kanto region of Japan since 2005.

== Design ==
TX-2000 series trains are capable of operating on both the 1,500 V DC and 20 kV AC sections of the Tsukuba Express, and therefore operate over the full length of the line. (The DC-only TX-1000 series sets are restricted to the Akihabara – Moriya section of the line.)

== Formation ==
As of 1 April 2016, the fleet consists of 23 six-car sets (51 to 73), consisting of four motored (M) cars and two trailer (T) cars, and formed as follows with car 1 at the Tsukuba (northern) end.

Car No.	1	2	3	4	5	6
Designation	CT1	M1	M2	M1'	M2'	CT2
Numbering	TX-2100	TX-2200	TX-2300	TX-2400	TX-2500	TX-2600
Capacity Total/seated	147/48	158/51	153/60	153/60	158/51	147/48
Weight (t)	30.3	38.1	34.4	38.3	34.3	30.9

Cars 2 and 4 are each fitted with two single-arm pantographs.

== Interior ==
Passenger accommodation primarily consists of longitudinal bench seating. The middle two cars, 3 and 4, were built with transverse seating bays with folding tables, but from April 2017, the transverse seating was gradually replaced by longitudinal bench seating.

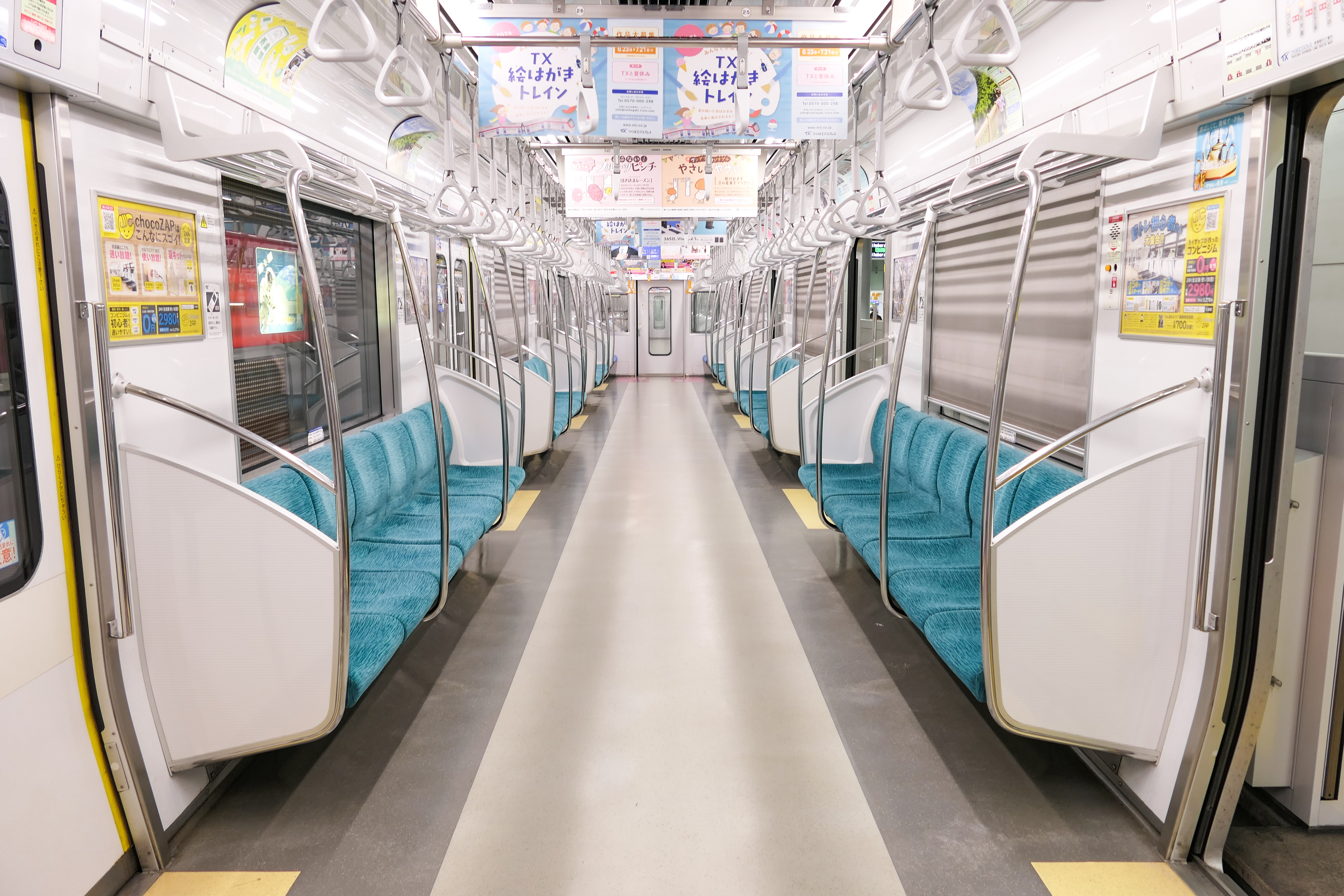
Interior view (longitudinal seating)

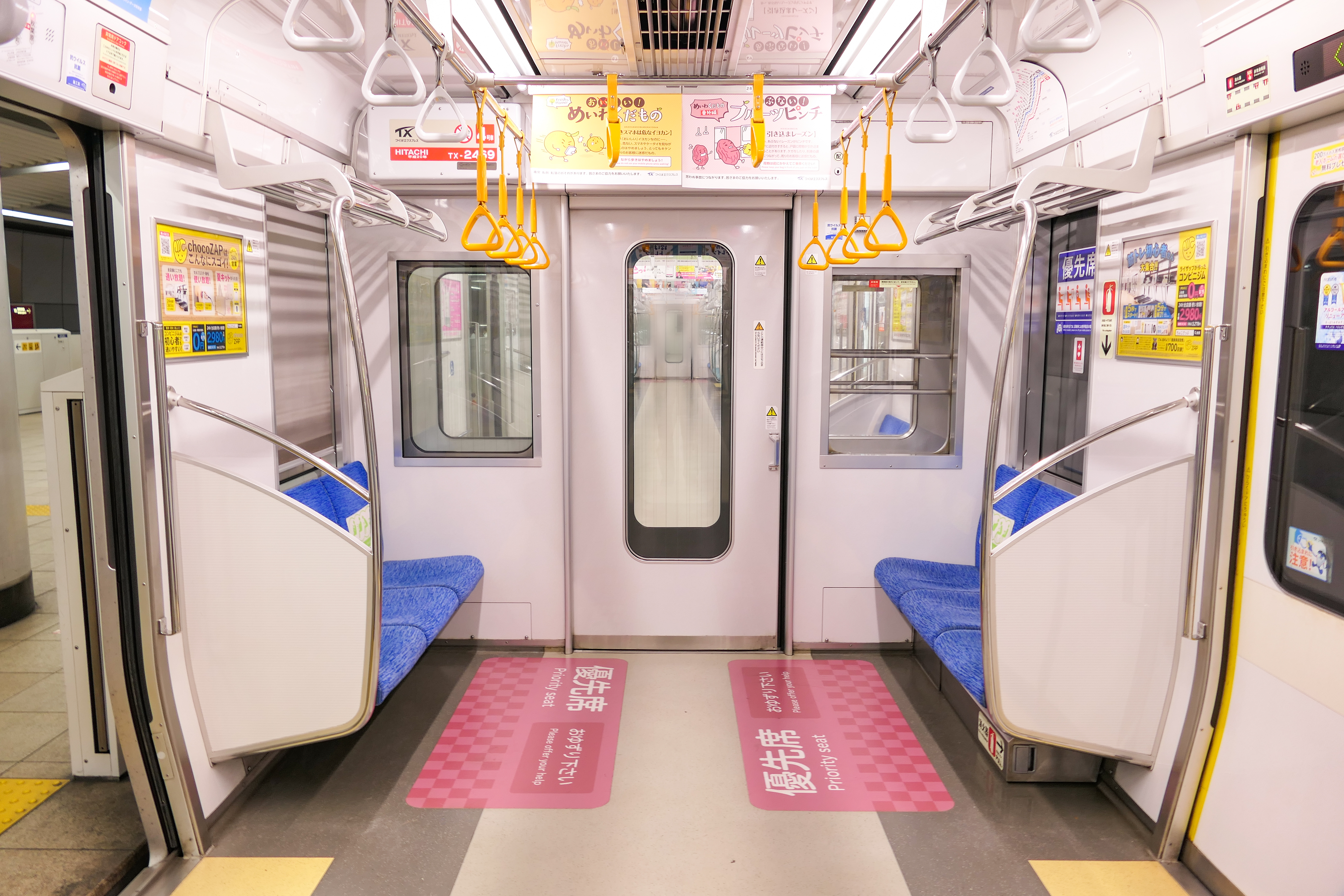
Priority seating

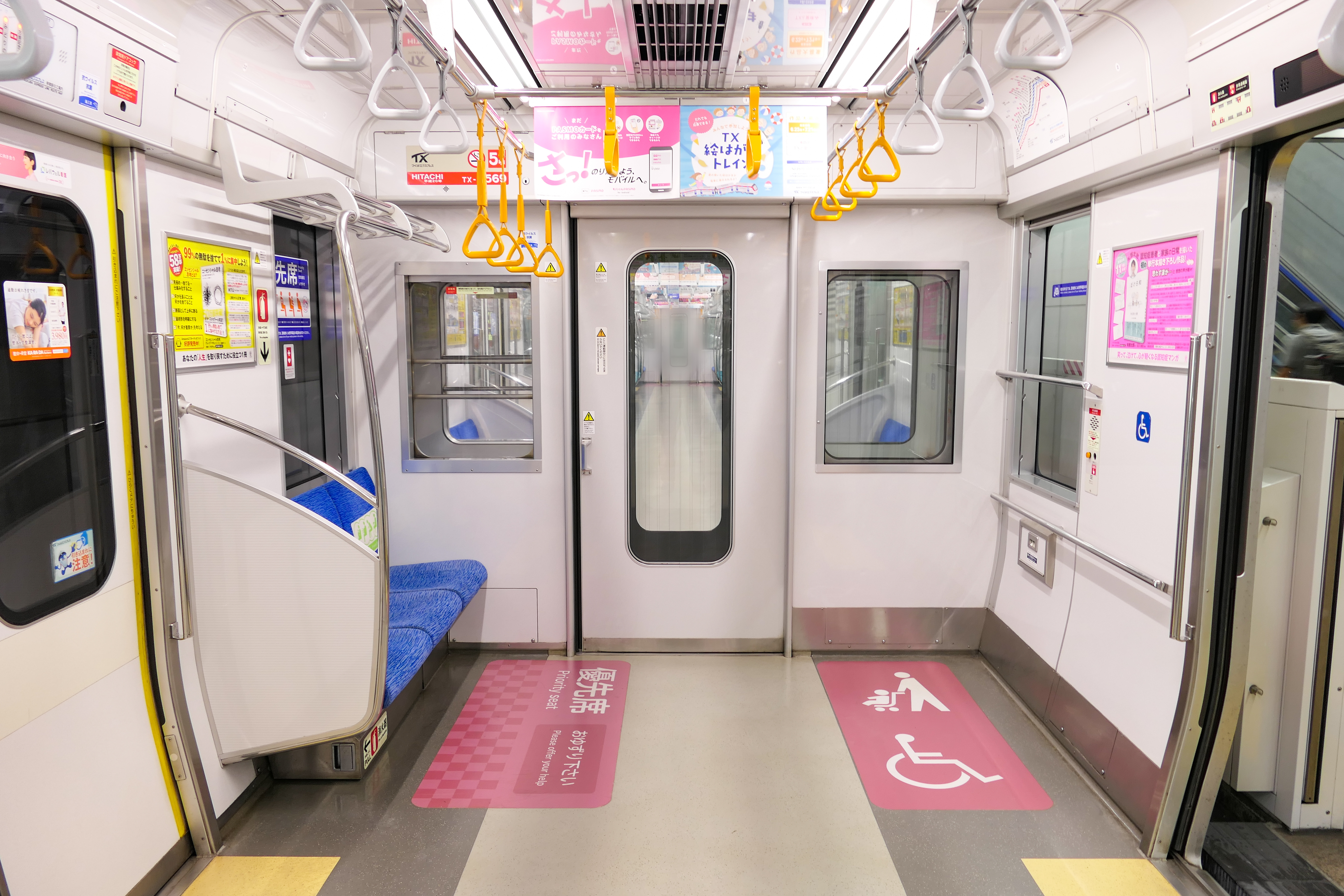
Priority seating with wheelchair space at right

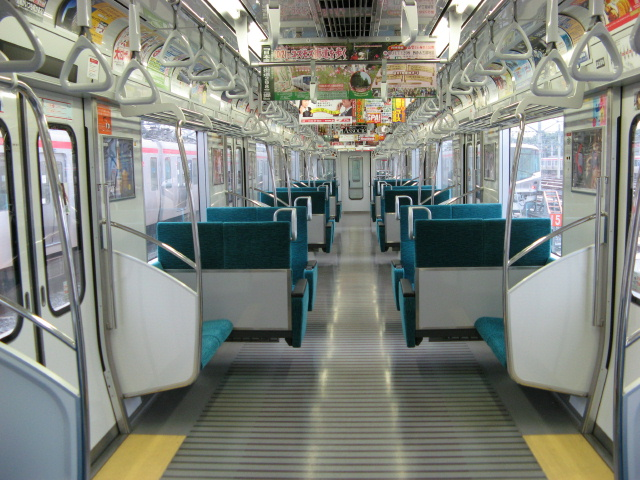
Interior view showing transverse seating

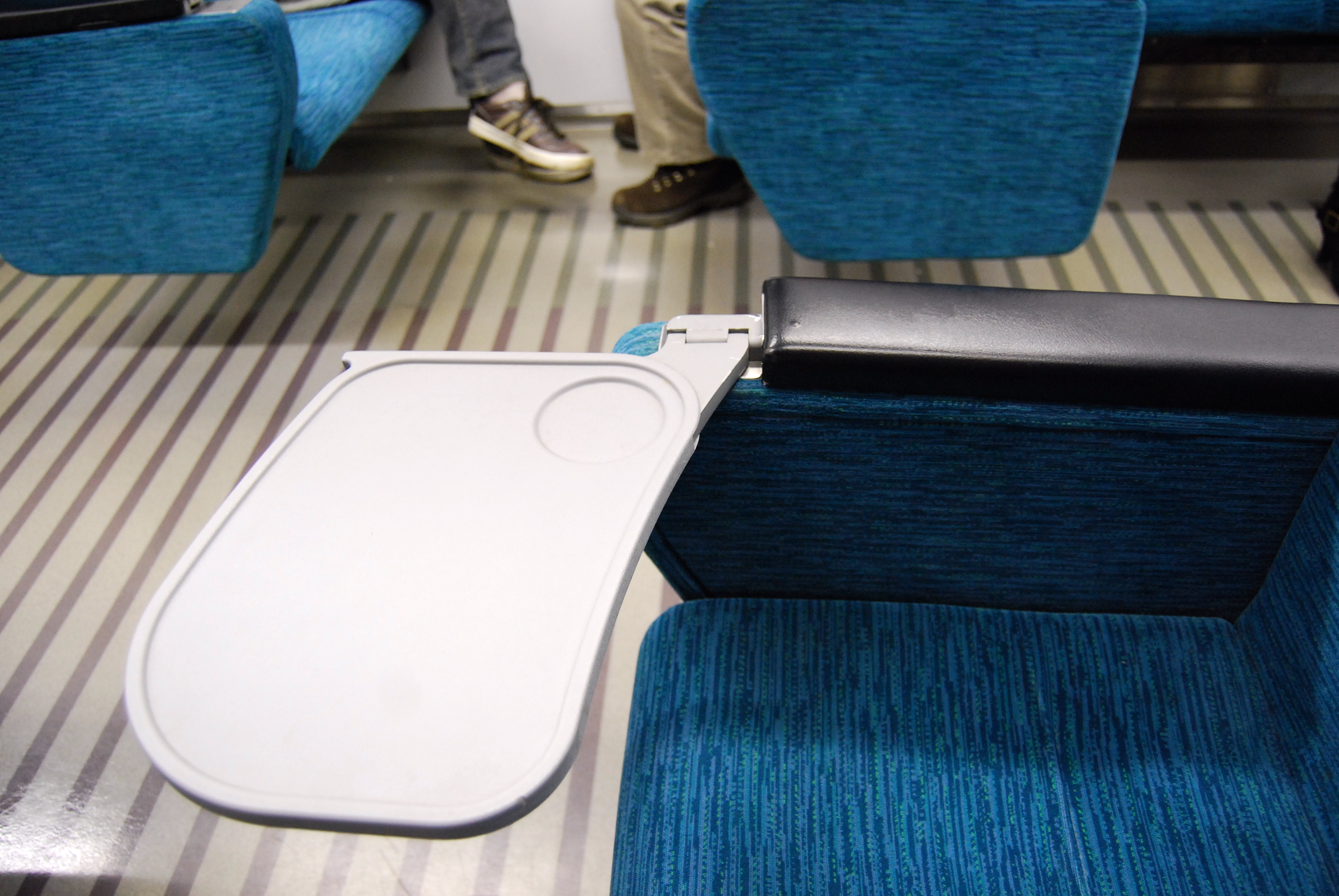
Folding table fitted to transverse seating bays

== History ==
The first six-car prototype was built in March 2003, and 15 more sets were subsequently delivered from Hitachi between January and July 2004, entering service on 24 August 2005. Four additional sets (67 to 70) were delivered in 2008 to provide increased capacity. These later sets differ in having a red bodyline stripe added below the windows.

A further three six-car sets were delivered in June and August 2012 to provide additional capacity. These three sets, 71 to 73, feature a number of design improvements over earlier sets, including the use of LED interior lighting, increased seat thickness, and opening windows to provide ventilation at the ends of cars.

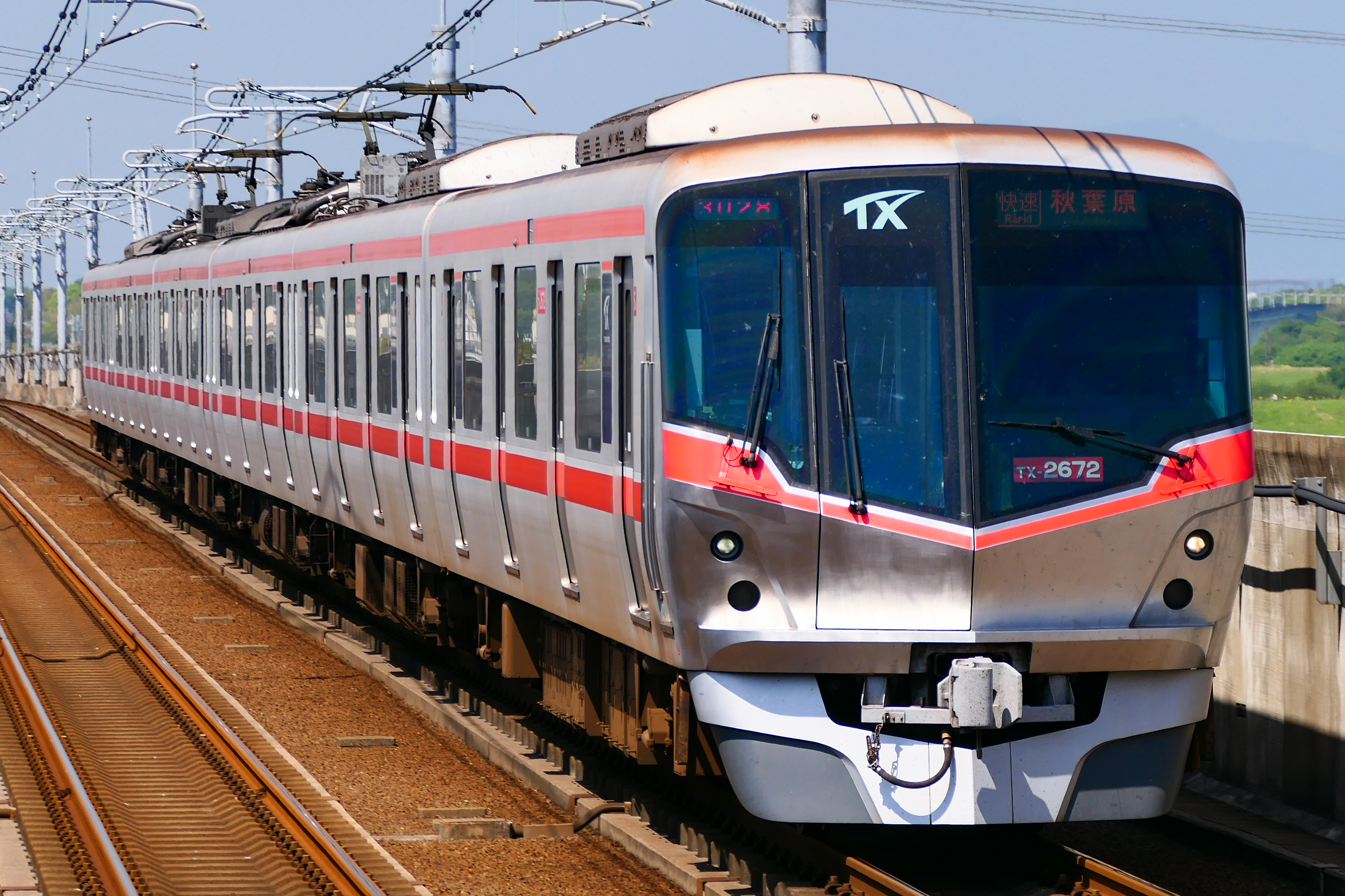
Late-build set 72 in May 2023
