= Nagareyama-centralpark Station =

Railway station in Nagareyama, Chiba Prefecture, Japan

Nagareyama-centralpark Station 流山セントラルパーク駅
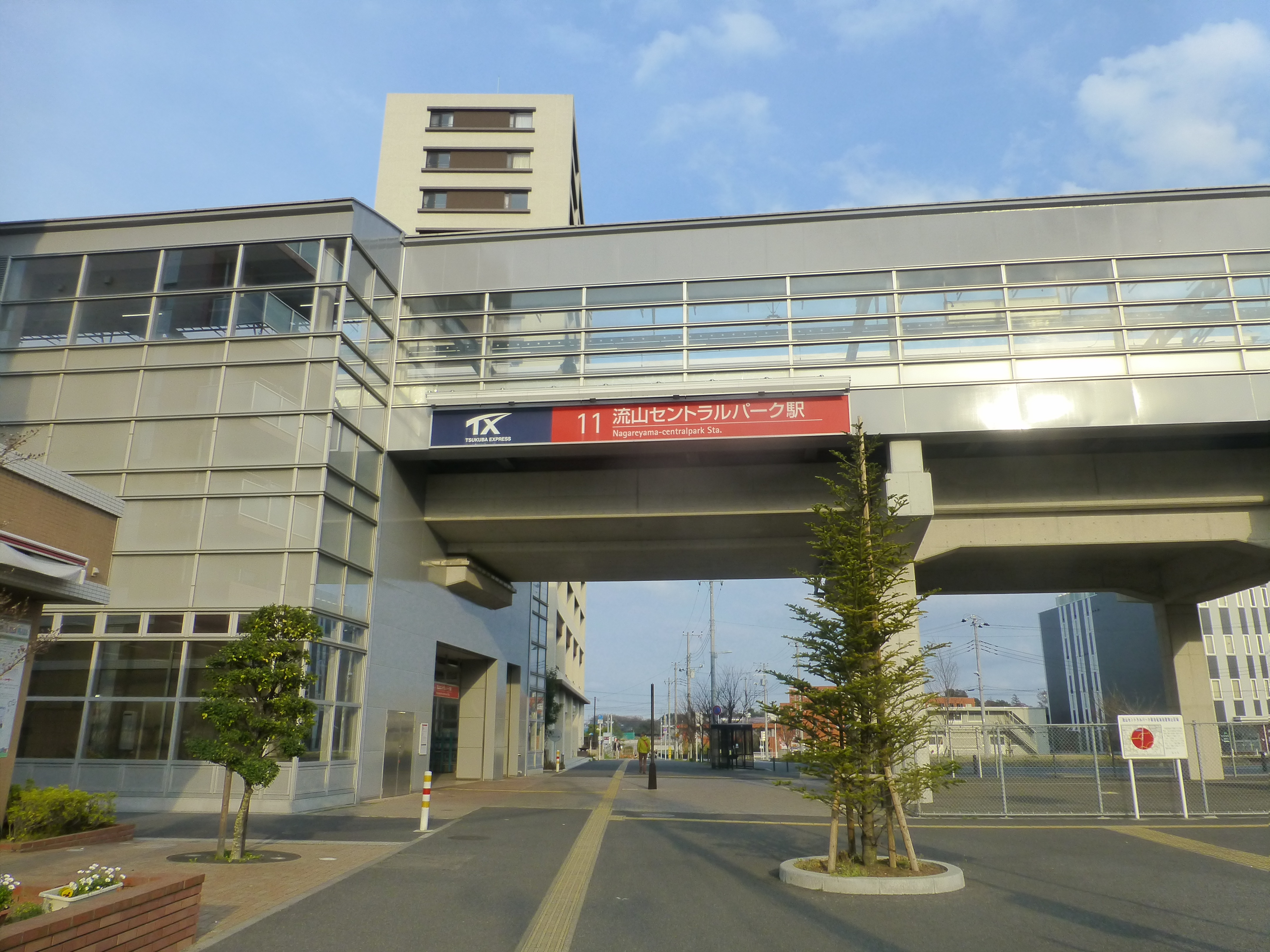
- Exterior of Nagareyama-centralpark Station, 2016

General information
- Location: 119 Maehirai, Nagareyama-shi, Chiba-ken 270-0152; Japan
- Coordinates: 35°51′15.15″N 139°54′54.59″E
- Operator: Metropolitan Intercity Railway Company
- Line: Tsukuba Express
- Distance: 24.3 km from Akihabara
- Platforms: 2 (2 side platforms)

Construction
- Structure type: Elevated
- Accessible: Yes

Other information
- Status: Staffed
- Station code: TX11
- Website: Official website

History
- Opened: 24 August 2005

Passengers
- FY2019: 5,259 daily

Services
Preceding station	Tsukuba Express	Following station
Minami-Nagareyama (TX10) towards Akihabara	Tsukuba Express Local	Nagareyama-ōtakanomori (TX12) towards Tsukuba
Location
- Location within Chiba Prefecture Location within Japan

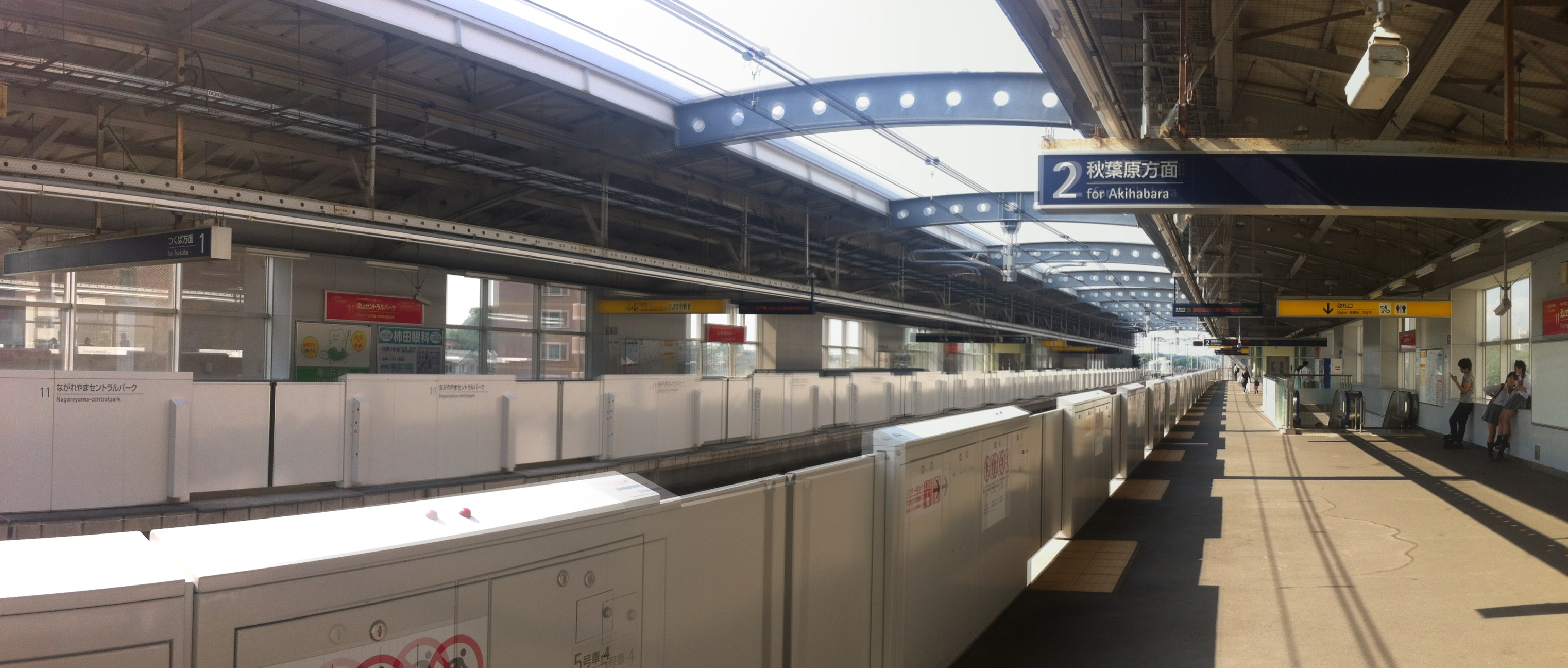
The platforms, July 2014

Nagareyama-centralpark Station (流山セントラルパーク駅, Nagareyama-sentorarupāku-eki) is a passenger railway station in the city of Nagareyama, Chiba Prefecture, Japan. Its station number is TX11.

== Line ==
Nagareyama-centralpark Station is served by the Metropolitan Intercity Railway Company's Tsukuba Express line, which operates between Akihabara Station in Tokyo and Tsukuba Station. It is located 24.3 kilometers from the terminus of the line at Akihabara.

== Station structure ==
The station consists of two opposed elevated side platforms, with the station building located underneath.

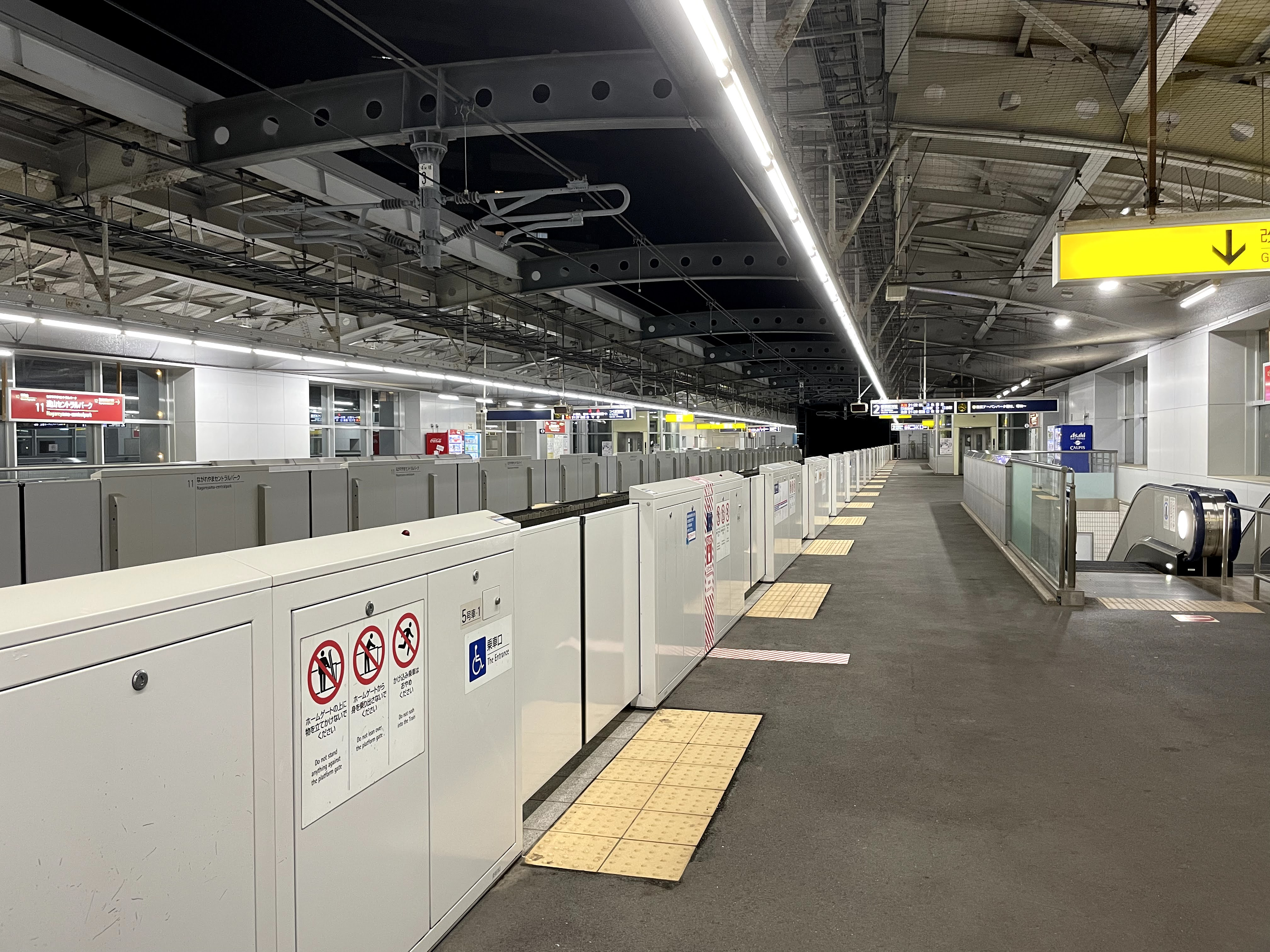
Platform (October, 2021)

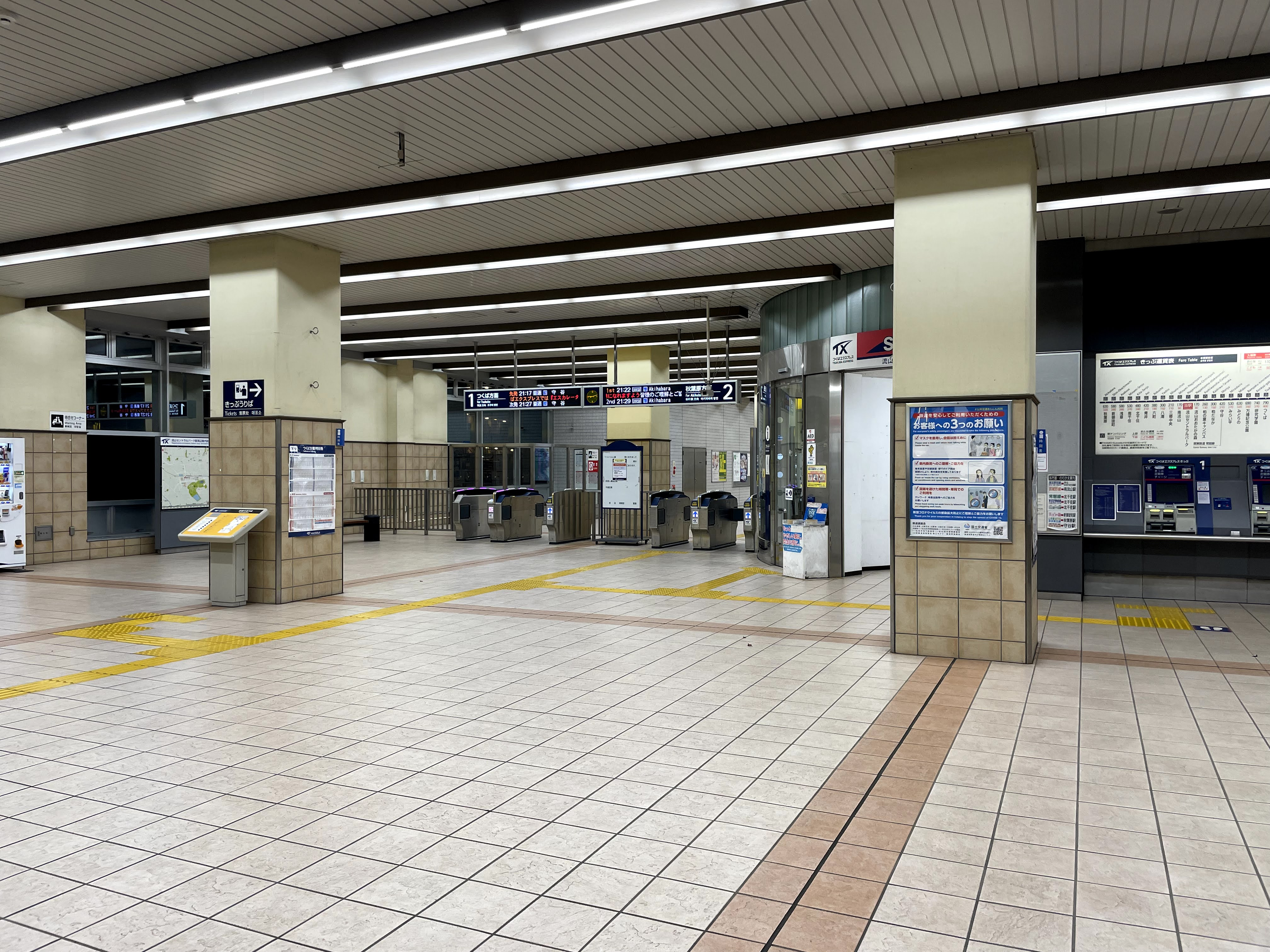
Gates (October, 2021)

=== Platforms ===
1	■ Tsukuba Express	for Tsukuba
2	■ Tsukuba Express	for Akihabara

== History ==
The station opened on 24 August 2005, coinciding with the opening of the Tsukuba Express Line.

== Passenger statistics ==
In fiscal 2019, the station was used by an average of 5,259 passengers daily (boarding passengers only).

== Surrounding area ==
- Gyosei Kokusai Nagareyama Elementary School
- Nagareyama City Yagiminami Elementary School
- Tokatsu Hospital

== See also ==
- List of railway stations in Japan
