= TX-1000 series =

Japanese train type

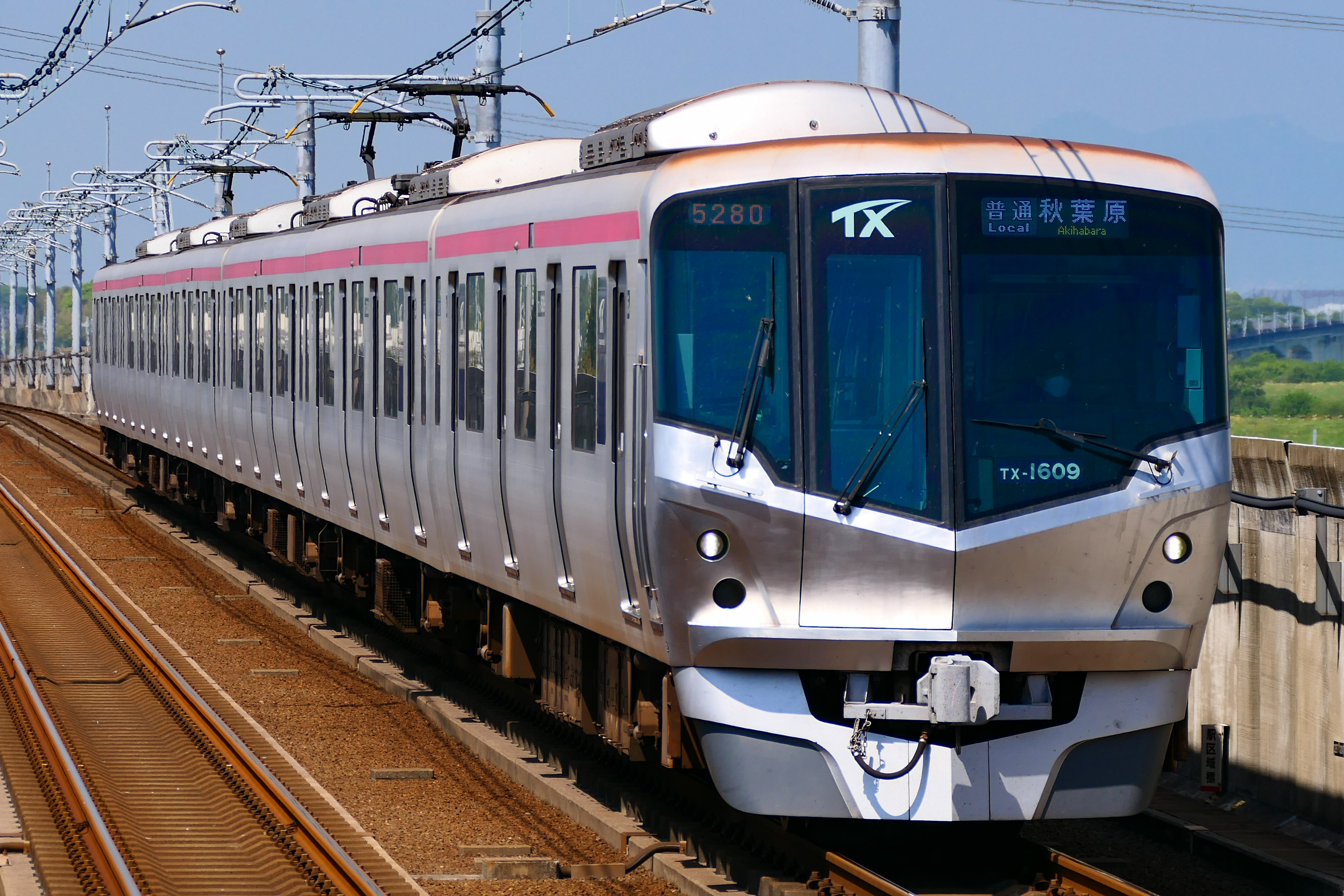
- Tsukuba Express 1000 series
- In service: 2005–present
- Manufacturer: Kawasaki Heavy Industries
- Built at: Kobe
- Constructed: 2003–2005
- Number built: 84 vehicles (14 sets)
- Number in service: 84 vehicles (14 sets)
- Formation: 6 cars per trainset
- Fleet numbers: 01-14
- Operators: Metropolitan Intercity Railway Company
- Depots: Moriya
- Lines served: Tsukuba Express

Specifications
- Car body construction: Aluminium
- Car length: 20,800 mm (68 ft 3 in) (end cars); 20,000 mm (65 ft 7 in) (intermediate cars)
- Width: 2,950 mm (9 ft 8 in)
- Height: 4,070 mm (13 ft 4 in)
- Doors: 4 pairs per side
- Maximum speed: 130 km/h (80 mph)
- Traction system: PWM-VVVF
- Power output: 190 kW per motor
- Acceleration: 3.0 km/(h⋅s) (1.9 mph/s)
- Deceleration: 4.2 km/(h⋅s) (2.6 mph/s); 4.4 km/(h⋅s) (2.7 mph/s) (emergency)
- Electric system(s): 1,500 V DC (overhead wire)
- Current collector(s): Pantograph
- Safety system(s): ATC, ATO
- Track gauge: 1,067 mm (3 ft 6 in)

The TX-1000 series (TX-1000系) is an electric multiple unit (EMU) train type operated by the Metropolitan Intercity Railway Company on the Tsukuba Express line in the Kantō region of Japan since 2005. A total of 84 cars were delivered.

== Design ==
The TX-1000 series trains use unpainted double-skin aluminium body construction assembled with friction stir welding. They are used only on the Akihabara – Moriya section of the Tsukuba Express line, which is electrified at 1,500 V DC, as the rest of the line is electrified at 20 kV AC; services beyond Moriya to Tsukuba are operated by dual-voltage TX-2000 series sets only.

== Formation ==
Car No.	1	2	3	4	5	6
Designation	CT1	M1	T'	M1'	M2'	CT2
Numbering	1100	1200	1300	1400	1500	1600
Capacity Total/seated	147/48	158/51	158/54	158/54	158/51	147/48
Weight (t)	30.3	33.6	26.5	33.8	31.3	30.9

Car 2 is fitted with one single-arm pantograph and car 4 is fitted with two.

== Interior ==
Passenger accommodation consists of longitudinal bucket-style seating throughout.

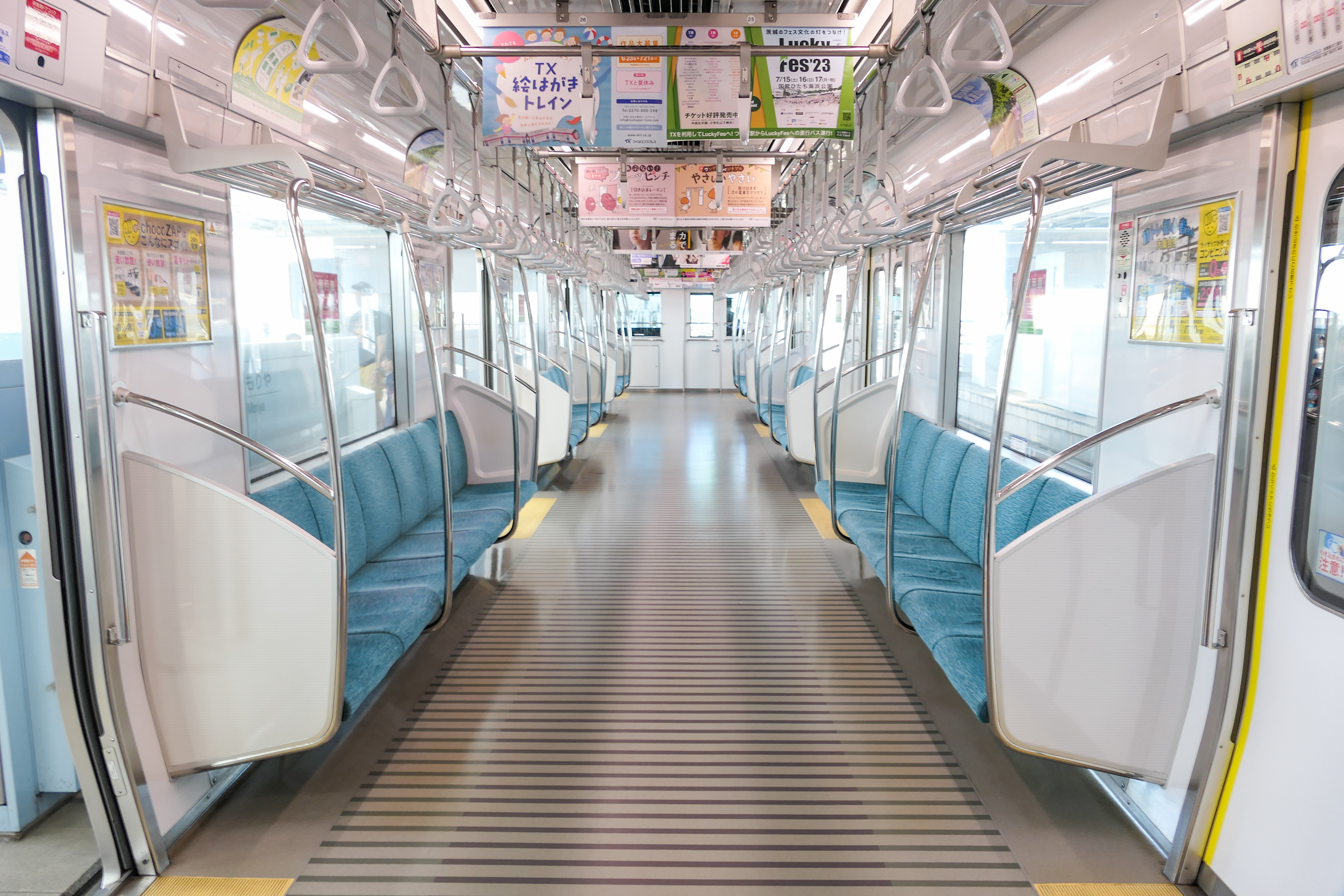
Interior

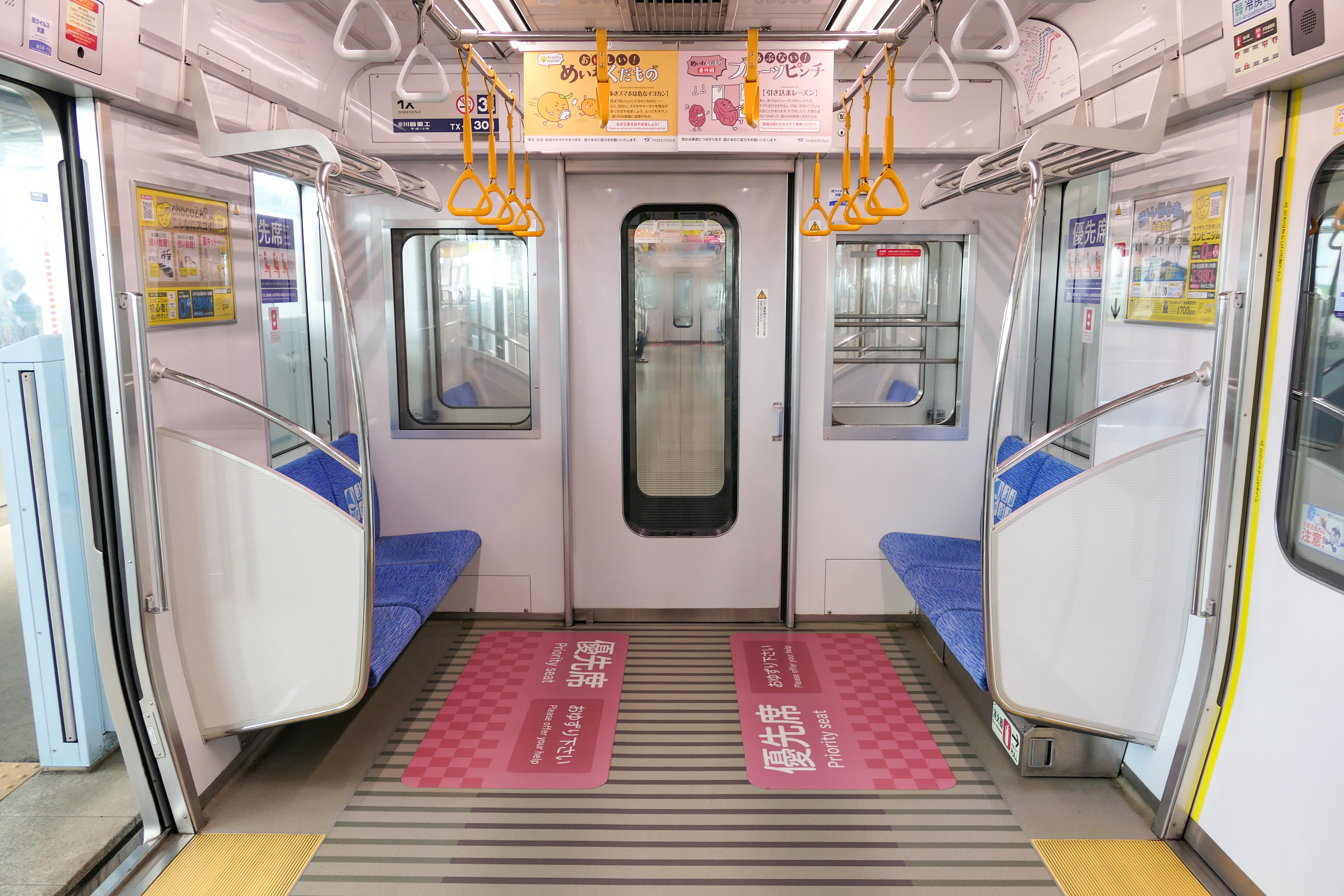
Priority seating

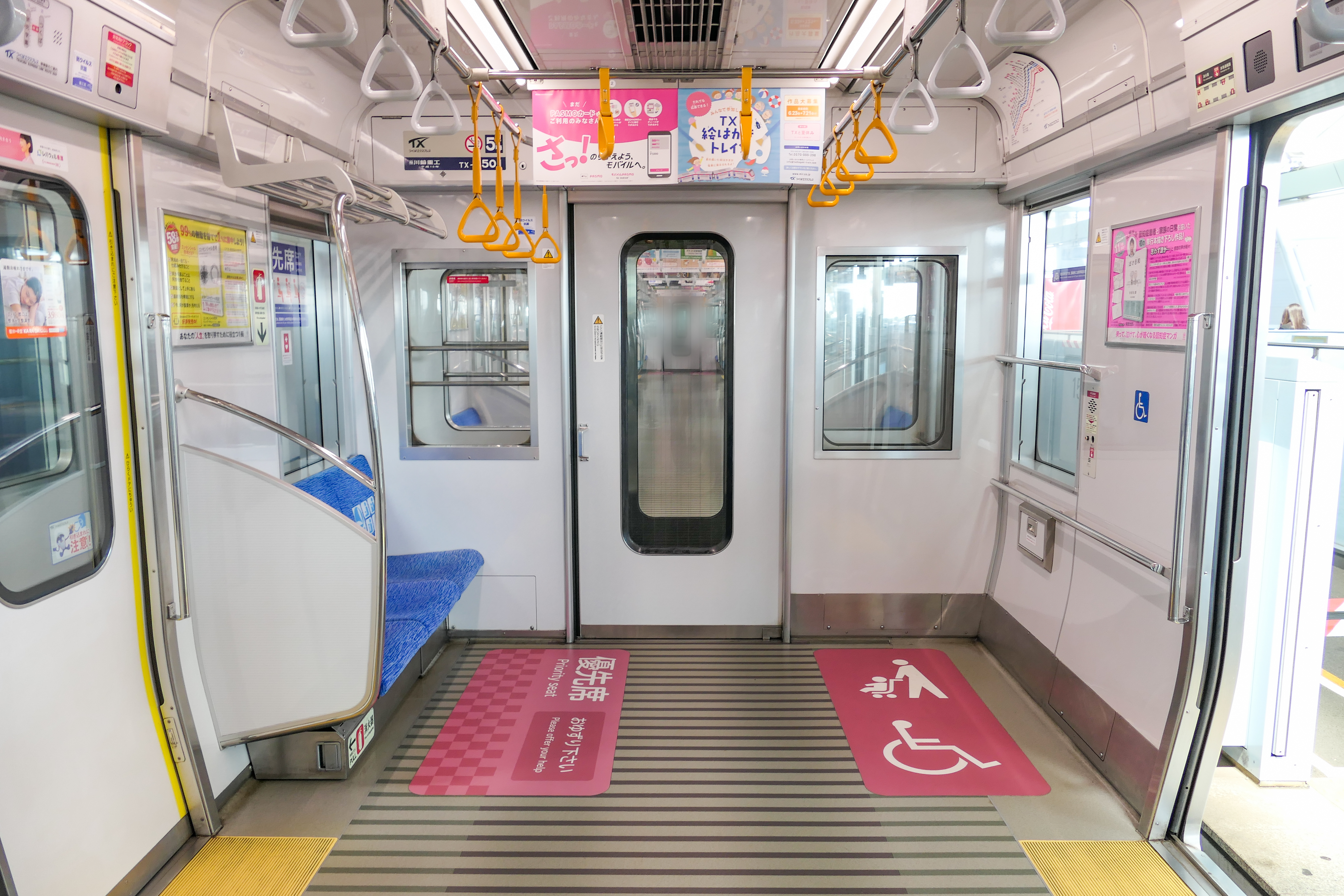
Wheelchair space

== History ==
The first 6-car prototype was built in March 2003 by Kawasaki Heavy Industries, and 13 more sets were subsequently delivered between March 2004 and January 2005.
