= Tsukuba Express =

Railway line in Tokyo, Japan

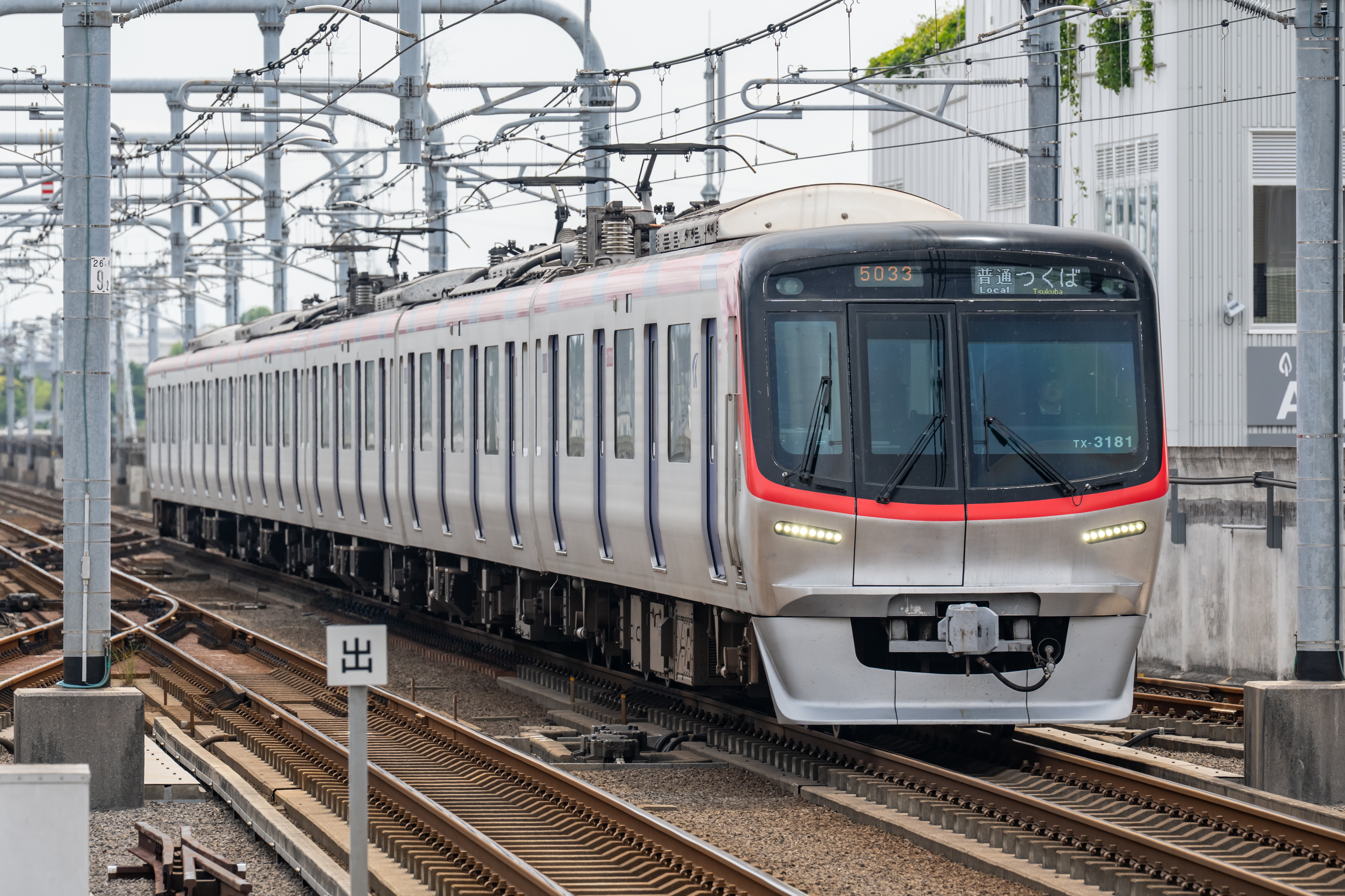
- A TX-3000 series train approaching Nagareyama-ōtakanomori Station

Overview
- Native name: つくばエクスプレス
- Owner: Metropolitan Intercity Railway Company
- Locale: Kanto Region
- Termini: Akihabara; Tsukuba
- Stations: 20

Service
- Type: Heavy rail
- Operator: Metropolitan Intercity Railway Company
- Depot: Moriya
- Rolling stock: TX-1000 series; TX-2000 series; TX-3000 series
- Daily ridership: 431,060 (daily 2015)

History
- Opened: 24 August 2005; 21 years ago

Technical
- Line length: 58.3 km (36.2 mi)
- Track gauge: 1,067 mm (3 ft 6 in)
- Electrification: Overhead line: 1,500 V DC (Akihabara–Moriya); 20 kV 50 Hz AC (Moriya–Tsukuba)
- Operating speed: 130 km/h (81 mph)
Route map
A comparison of Tsukuba Express with Jōban Line and express bus service between Tokyo and Tsukuba
Station stops

The Tsukuba Express (Japanese: つくばエクスプレス, Hepburn: Tsukuba Ekusupuresu), or TX, is a Japanese railway line operated by the third-sector company Metropolitan Intercity Railway Company, which links Akihabara Station in Chiyoda, Tokyo and Tsukuba Station in Tsukuba, Ibaraki. The route was inaugurated on 24 August 2005.

== History ==
(video) Tsukuba Express line train

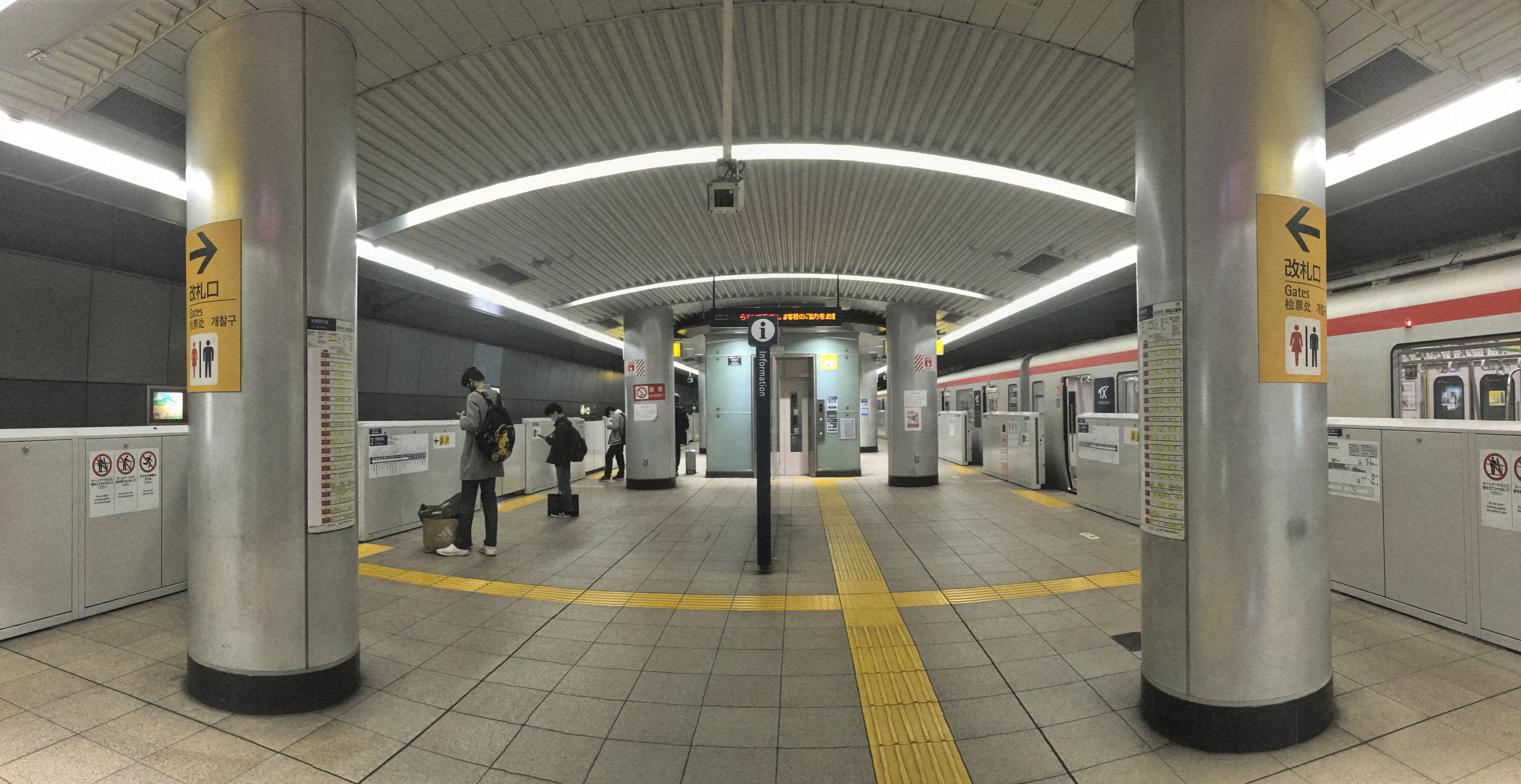
Platform level of Tsukuba Station

The Metropolitan Intercity Railway Company (首都圏新都市鉄道株式会社, Shuto-ken Shin Toshi Tetsudō Kabushiki-gaisha) was founded on 15 March 1991 to construct the Tsukuba Express, which was then provisionally called the Jōban New Line (常磐新線, Jōban Shinsen). The new line was planned to relieve crowding on the Jōban Line operated by East Japan Railway Company (JR East), which had reached the limit of its capacity. However, with the economic downturn in Japan, the goal shifted to development along the line. This was facilitated by the enactment of the Special Measures Law in September 1989 which allowed the expedition of large housing projects as well as the expansion and construction of new and existing railway lines.

During the early stages of construction, the construction company (Japan Railway Construction, Transport and Technology Agency, or JRTT) as well as associated keiretsu and associates in the public sector purchased land situated on the alignment of the route. Eventually, all the lots would be joined continuously, completed or not, and their ownership transferred to the eventual railway operator, MIRC. Construction of all stations were centered around the theme of universal design.

Also, the initial plan called for a line from Tokyo Station to Moriya, but expenses forced the planners to start the line at Akihabara instead of Tokyo Station, and pressure from the government of Ibaraki Prefecture resulted in moving the extension from Moriya to Tsukuba into Phase I of the construction.

The original schedule called for the line to begin operating in 2000, but delays in construction pushed the opening date to summer 2005. The line eventually opened on 24 August 2005.

From the start of the revised timetable on 15 October 2012, new "Commuter rapid" (通勤快速, tsūkin kaisoku) services were introduced in the morning (inbound services) and evening (outbound services) peak periods.

=== Future plans ===
In September 2013, a number of municipalities along the Tsukuba Express line in Ibaraki Prefecture submitted a proposal to complete the extension of the line to Tokyo Station at the same time as a new airport-to-airport line proposed as part of infrastructure improvements for the 2020 Summer Olympics.

On 31 March 2023, four proposals for possible northern extensions were submitted to Ibaraki Prefecture governor Kazuhiko Ōigawa. The proposals included plans to extend the line to either:

- Tsuchiura Station on the Joban Line
- Ibaraki Airport
- Mito (via Ishioka Station) on the Joban Line
- Mount Tsukuba

According to the proposals, the plan for the extension to Tsuchiura Station produced the most favourable cost-benefit analysis.

== Driving ==
The Tsukuba Express is operated as a one-man (conductorless) train. The driver opens and closes the doors manually, but operation of the train is done automatically. The line has a top speed of 130 km/h (81 mph). The Rapid service reduced the time required for the trip from Akihabara to Tsukuba from the previous 1 hour 30 minutes (by the Jōban Line, arriving in Tsuchiura, about 15 km (9.3 mi) from Tsukuba) or 70 minutes (by bus, under optimal traffic conditions) to 45 minutes. From Tokyo, the trip takes 50–55 minutes. The line features no level crossings.

== Electrification and rolling stock ==
To prevent interference with the geomagnetic measurements of the Japan Meteorological Agency at its laboratory in Ishioka, the portion of the line from Moriya to Tsukuba operates on alternating current. As a result, three train models are used on the line: TX-1000 series DC-only trains, which can operate only between Akihabara and Moriya, and TX-2000 series and TX-3000 series dual-voltage AC/DC trains, both of which can operate over the entire line.

Volume production of the line's initial rolling stock began in January 2004, following the completion in March 2003 of two (TX-1000 and TX-2000 series) six-car trains for trial operation and training. The full fleet of 84 TX-1000s (14 six-car trains) and 96 TX-2000s (16 six-car trains) was delivered by January 2005. New TX-3000 series trains built by Hitachi Rail entered service on 14 March 2020.

== Operation ==
Metropolitan Intercity Railway Company offers four types of train services on the Tsukuba Express:

- Local (普通, Futsū)
- Semi Rapid (区間快速, Kukan Kaisoku)
- Commuter Rapid (通勤快速, Tsūkin Kaisoku)
- Rapid (快速, Kaisoku)

=== Station list ===
Trains stop at stations marked "●" and skip stations marked "|". During the morning rush hour on weekdays, Semi Rapid trains bound for Akihabara make an additional stop at Rokuchō (marked "▲").

No.	Station	Distance in km (mi)	Elec.	Local	Semi Rapid	Commuter Rapid	Rapid	Transfers	Location	
TX01	Akihabara 秋葉原	0 (0)	DC	●	●	●	●	Yamanote Line (JY03); Keihin–Tōhoku Line (JK28); Chūō–Sōbu Line (JB19); Hibiya Line (H-16); Shinjuku Line (Iwamotocho: S-08) (Note: Both stations are displayed on station maps as being distant from one another, and they are not announced as transfer points for one another.)	Chiyoda	Tokyo
TX02	Shin-Okachimachi 新御徒町	1.6 (0.99)	DC	●	●	●	●	Ōedo Line (E-10)	Taitō	Tokyo
TX03	Asakusa 浅草	3.1 (1.9)	DC	●	●	●	●	Ginza Line (Tawaramachi: G-18)	Taitō	Tokyo
TX04	Minami-Senju 南千住	5.6 (3.5)	DC	●	●	●	●	Jōban Line (Rapid) (JJ04); Hibiya Line (H-21)	Arakawa	Tokyo
TX05	Kita-Senju 北千住	7.5 (4.7)	DC	●	●	●	●	Jōban Line (Rapid) (JJ05); Tobu Skytree Line (TS09); Chiyoda Line (C-18); Hibiya Line (H-22)	Adachi	Tokyo
TX06	Aoi 青井	10.6 (6.6)	DC	●	|	|	|		Adachi	Tokyo
TX07	Rokuchō 六町	12.0 (7.5)	DC	●	▲	●			Adachi	Tokyo
TX08	Yashio 八潮	15.6 (9.7)	DC	●	●	●	●		Yashio	Saitama
TX09	Misato-chūō 三郷中央	19.3 (12.0)	DC	●	●	|	|		Misato	Saitama
TX10	Minami-Nagareyama 南流山	22.1 (13.7)	DC	●	●	●	●	Musashino Line (JM16)	Nagareyama	Chiba
TX11	Nagareyama-centralpark 流山セントラルパーク	24.3 (15.1)	DC	●	|	|	|		Nagareyama	Chiba
TX12	Nagareyama-ōtakanomori 流山おおたかの森	26.5 (16.5)	DC	●	●	●	●	Tōbu Urban Park Line (TD22)	Nagareyama	Chiba
TX13	Kashiwanoha-campus 柏の葉キャンパス	30.0 (18.6)	DC	●	●	●	|		Kashiwa	Chiba
TX14	Kashiwa-Tanaka 柏たなか	32.0 (19.9)	DC	●	|	|	|		Kashiwa	Chiba
TX15	Moriya 守谷	37.7 (23.4)	DC	●	●	●	●	Jōsō Line	Moriya	Ibaraki
TX16	Miraidaira みらい平	44.3 (27.5)	AC	●	●	|	|		Tsukubamirai	Ibaraki
TX17	Midorino みどりの	48.6 (30.2)	AC	●	●	|	|		Tsukuba	Ibaraki
TX18	Bampaku-kinenkōen 万博記念公園	51.8 (32.2)	AC	●	●	|	|		Tsukuba	Ibaraki
TX19	Kenkyū-gakuen 研究学園	55.6 (34.5)	AC	●	●	●	|		Tsukuba	Ibaraki
TX20	Tsukuba つくば	58.3 (36.2)	AC	●	●	●	●		Tsukuba	Ibaraki

== Ridership figures ==
Fiscal year	Passengers carried (in millions)	Days operated	Passengers per day	Source
2005	34.69	220	150,000	
2006	70.69	365	195,000	
2007	84.85	366	234,000	
2008	93.21	365	258,000	
2009	97.79	365	270,300	
2010	102.22	365	283,000	
2011	104.89	366	290,000	
2012	110.66	365	306,000	
2013	118.22	365	323,900	
2014	118.84	365	325,600	
2015	124.14	365	340,100	
2016	129.64	366	354,200	
2017	135.12	365	370,200	
2018	139.74	365	386,000	
2019	143.10	365	395,000	
2020	100.44	365	278,000	
2021	110.61	365	306,000	

== See also ==
- List of railway companies in Japan
