= Metropolitan Intercity Railway Company =

Railway company in Japan

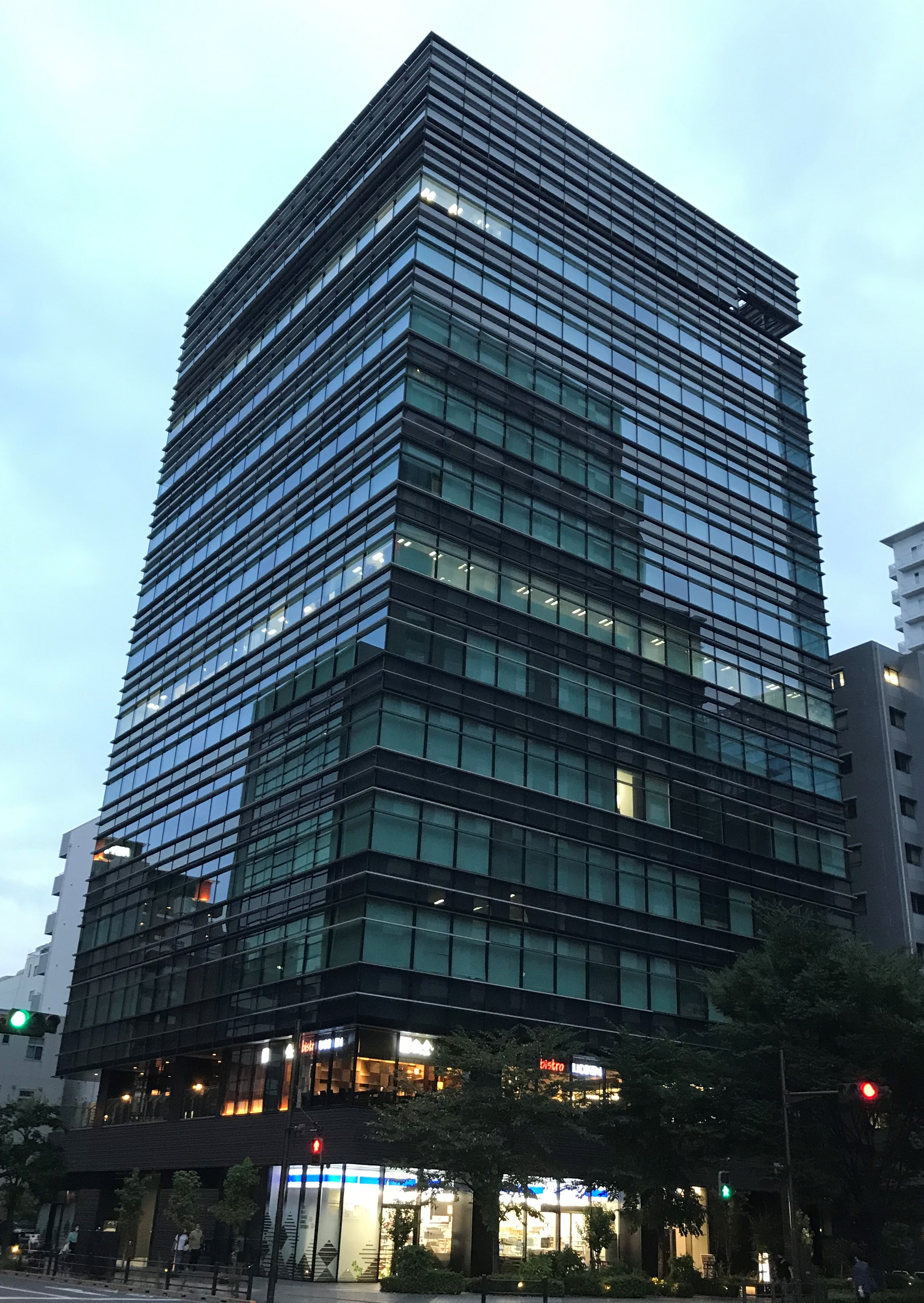
- Headquarters in Akihabara
- Native name: 首都圏新都市鉄道株式会社
- Romanized name: Shuto-ken Shin Toshi Tetsudō kabushiki gaisha
- Company type: Kabushiki gaisha
- Industry: Rail transport
- Founded: 15 March 1991
- Headquarters: Akihabara, Chiyoda, Tokyo, Japan
- Services: Tsukuba Express
- Website: www.mir.co.jp/en

The Metropolitan Intercity Railway Company (首都圏新都市鉄道株式会社, Shuto-ken Shin Toshi Tetsudō kabushiki gaisha; lit. "Metropolitan Area's New City Railway Stock Company") is a third-sector railway operating company in Japan. It was established on 15 March 1991 to construct the 58.3 km Tsukuba Express (then known as the Jōban Shinsen) commuter railway line from Akihabara in Tokyo to Tsukuba in Ibaraki Prefecture. The Tsukuba Express line was opened on 24 August 2005.

== Shareholders ==
As of 2019, the company is owned by the following local governments and municipalities.

Entity	% share
Ibaraki Prefecture	18.05
Tokyo	17.65
Chiba Prefecture	7.06
Adachi Ward, Tokyo	7.06
City of Tsukuba	6.67
Saitama Prefecture	5.88
Taitō Ward, Tokyo	5.3
City of Kashiwa	5.3
City of Nagareyama	5.3
Chiyoda Ward, Tokyo	2.65
Arakawa Ward, Tokyo	2.65

== See also ==
- Tsukuba Express
