= Horikirishōbuen Station =

Railway station in Tokyo, Japan

Coordinates: 35.7474°N 139.8276°E

KS07 Horikirishōbuen Station 堀切菖蒲園駅
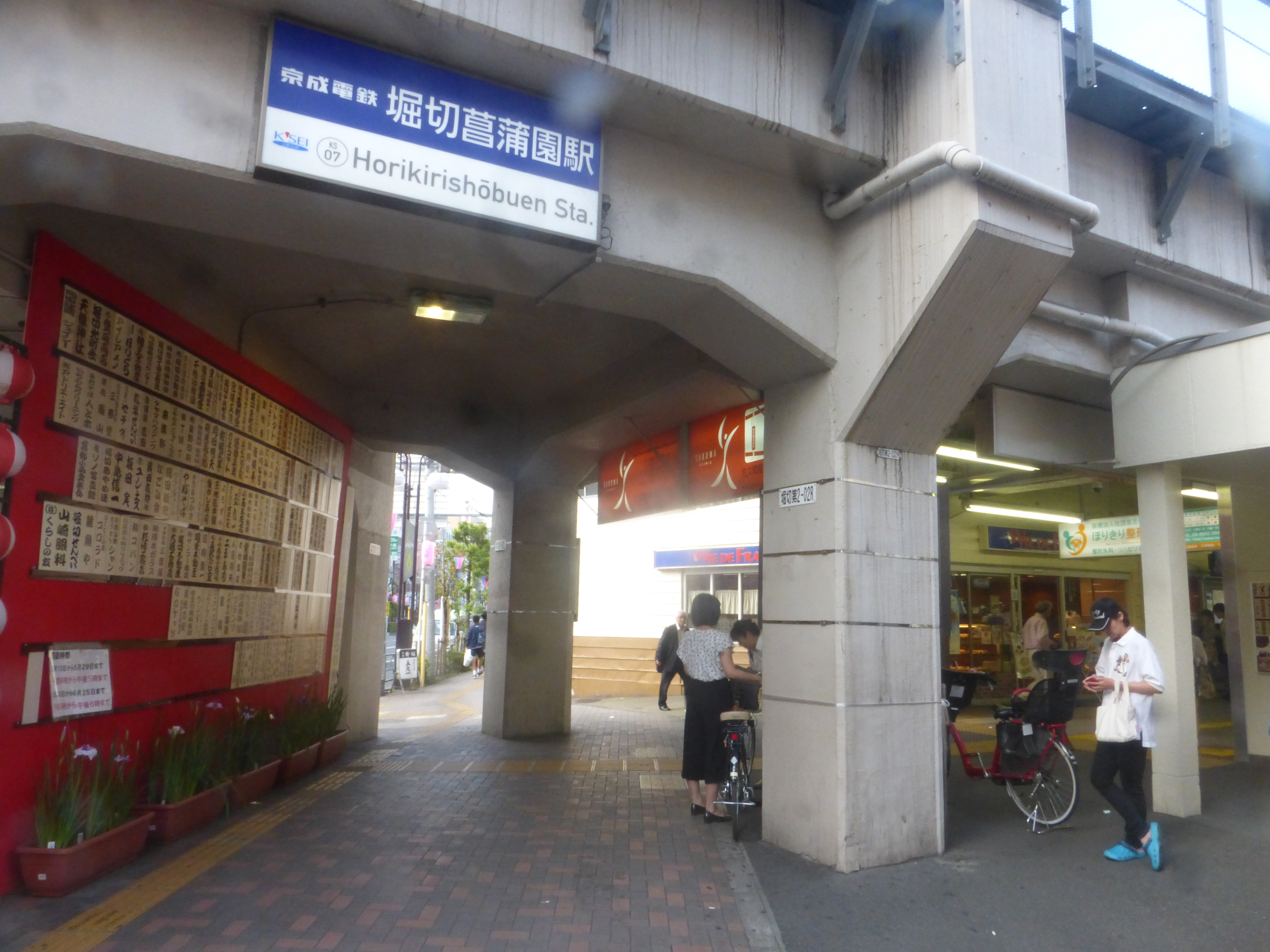

General information
- Location: 5 Horikiri, Katsushika, Tokyo; Japan
- Operator: Keisei Electric Railway
- Line: Keisei Main Line

Other information
- Station code: KS07

History
- Opened: December 19, 1931

Passengers
- FY2015: 20,944 daily

Services
| Preceding station | Keisei | Following station |
|---|---|---|
| Keisei Sekiya KS06 towards Keisei Ueno | Main Line Local | Ohanajaya KS08 towards Narita Airport Terminal 1 |
Location

Horikirishōbuen Station (堀切菖蒲園駅, Horikirishōbuen-eki) is a train station located in Katsushika, Tokyo.

== Lines ==
- Keisei Electric Railway
  - Keisei Main Line

== Layout ==
This station consists of two side platforms serving two tracks.

=== Platforms ===
| 1 | Keisei Main Line | for Keisei Ueno |
| 2 | Keisei Main Line | for Keisei Takasago, Keisei Kanamachi, Keisei Funabashi, Keisei Chiba, and Keisei Narita |

== History ==
- 1931 - Horikirishōbuen station begins operation.
- 2010 - Station numbering was introduced to all Keisei Line stations; Horikirishōbuen was assigned station number KS07.

== Around area ==
- Horikiri Station: It takes about ten minutes from this station to Horikiri Station, and if you go to Horikiri Station, you have to walk on the bridge which overs Arakawa River (Kantō).
- Horikiri Shobuen: Five minute's walk will bring to Horikiri Shobuen where is located south side of this station.
