= Kanegafuchi Station =

Railway station in Tokyo, Japan

Coordinates: 35.7336°N 139.8206°E

TS06 Kanegafuchi Station 鐘ヶ淵駅
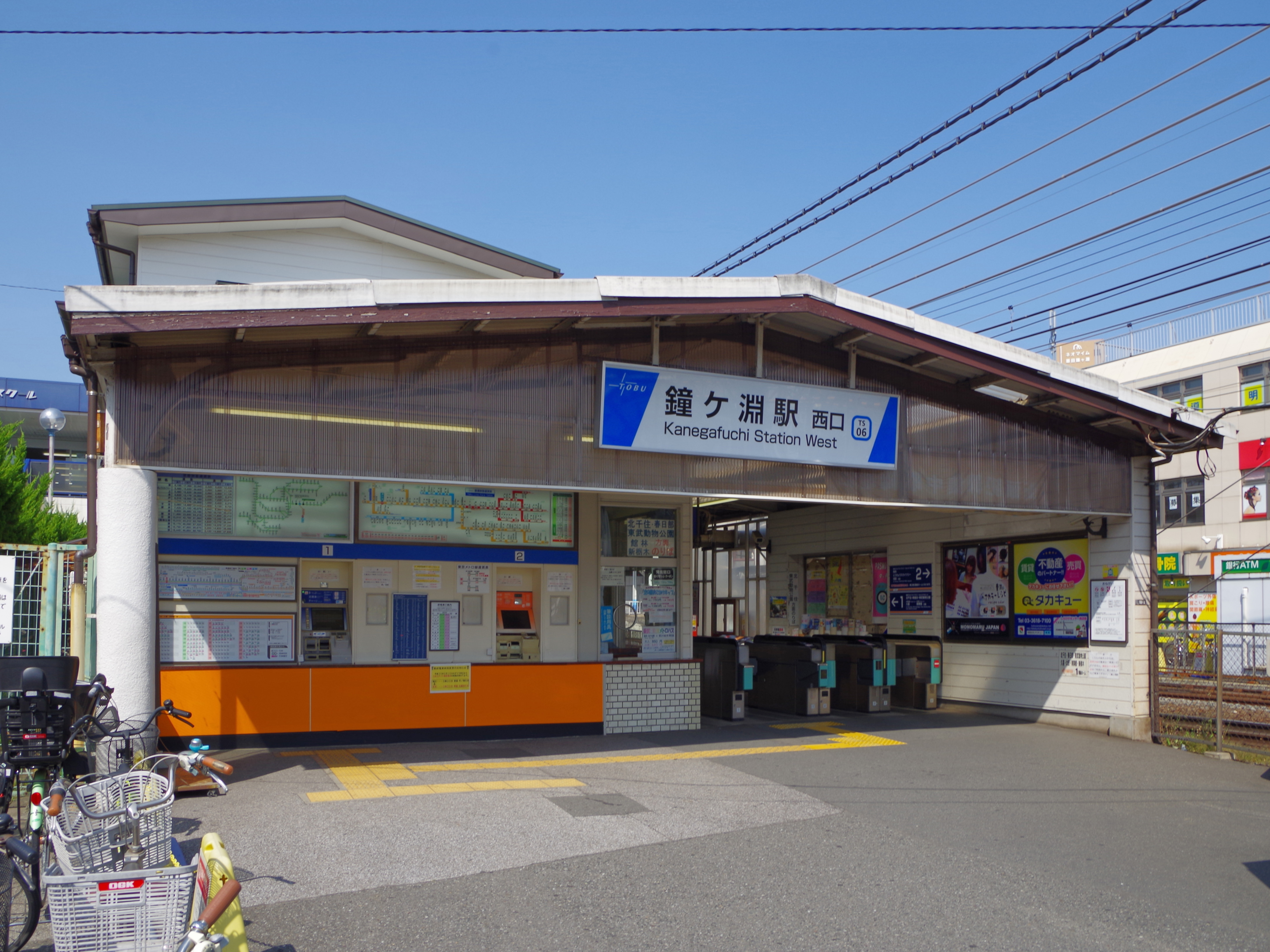
- Kanegafuchi Station and west entrance in May 2013

General information
- Location: 5-50-2 Sumida, Sumida-ku, Tokyo; Japan
- Operator: Tobu Railway
- Line: Tobu Skytree Line
- Distance: 4.2 km from the Tokyo terminus at Asakusa
- Platforms: 2 side platforms
- Tracks: 4

Other information
- Station code: TS-06
- Website: Official website

History
- Opened: 1 April 1902

Passengers
- FY2024: 6,526 daily boardings

Services
Preceding station	Tobu Railway	Following station
Higashi-Mukōjima TS05 towards Asakusa	Tobu Skytree Line Section Express Section Semi Express Local	Horikiri TS07 towards Tōbu-Dōbutsu-Kōen
Location
- Location within Japan

Kanegafuchi station (鐘ヶ淵駅, Kanegafuchi-eki) is a railway station on the Tobu Skytree Line in Sumida, Tokyo, Japan, operated by the private railway operator Tobu Railway.

== Lines ==
Kanegafuchi station is served by the Tobu Skytree Line, and is located 4.2 km (2.6 mi) from the Tokyo terminus at Asakusa.

== Station layout ==
The station consists of two opposed side platforms serving two tracks with two additional centre tracks for non-stopping trains.

=== Platforms ===
1	Tobu Skytree Line	for Kita-Senju, Kasukabe, Tōbu-Dōbutsu-Kōen, Kuki, and Minami-Kurihashi
2	Tobu Skytree Line	for Asakusa

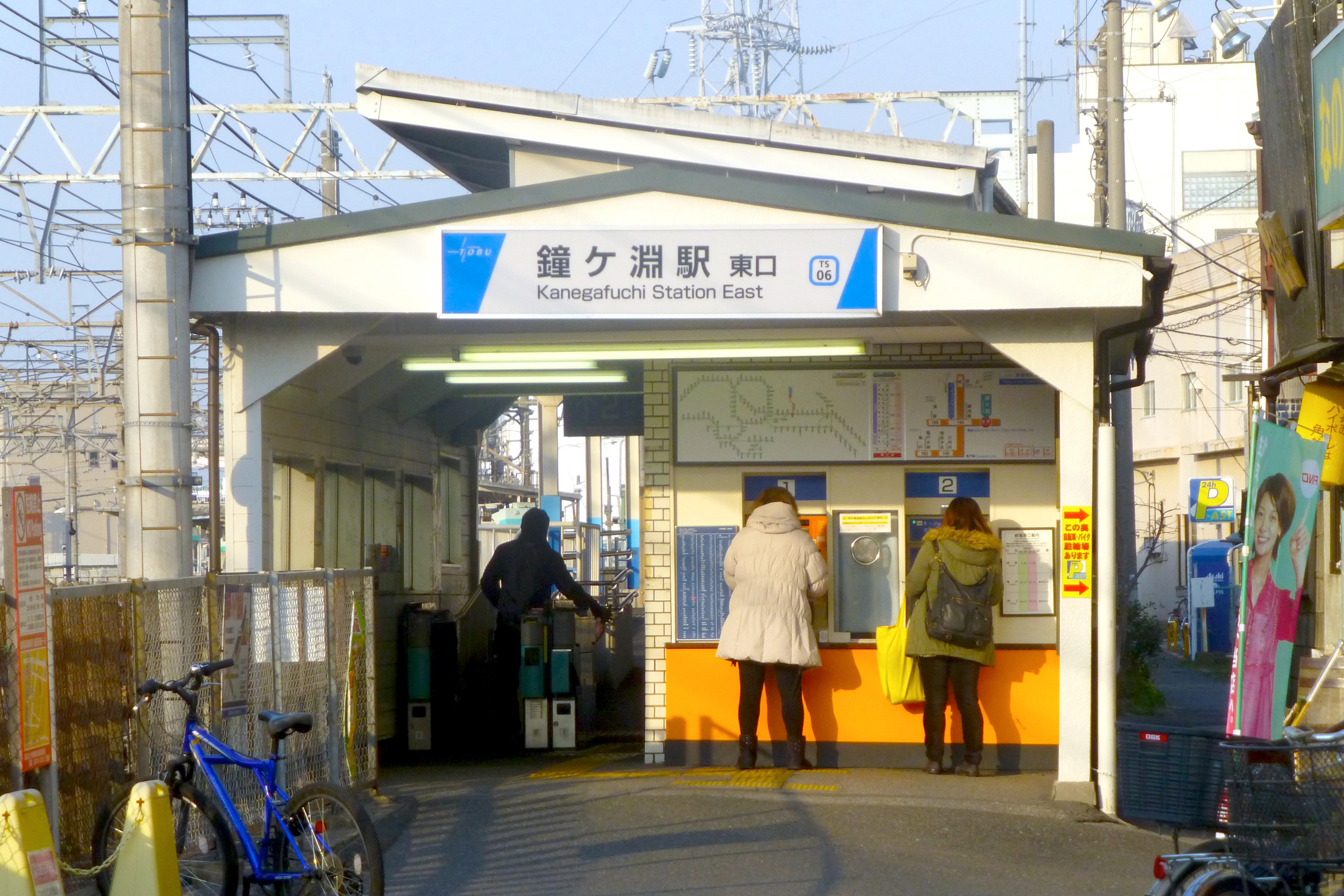
The east entrance in March 2014

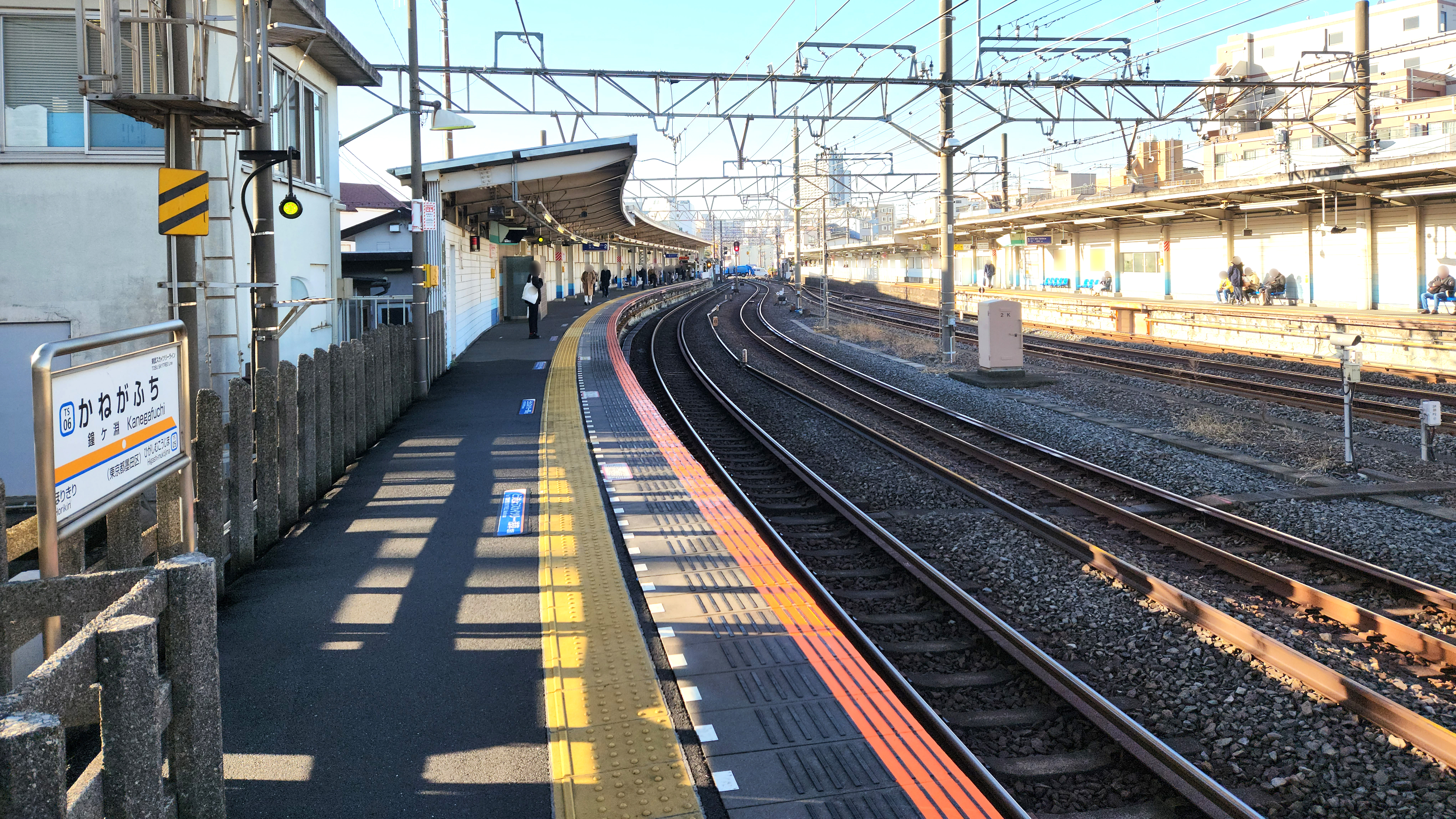
The platforms in December 2022

== History ==
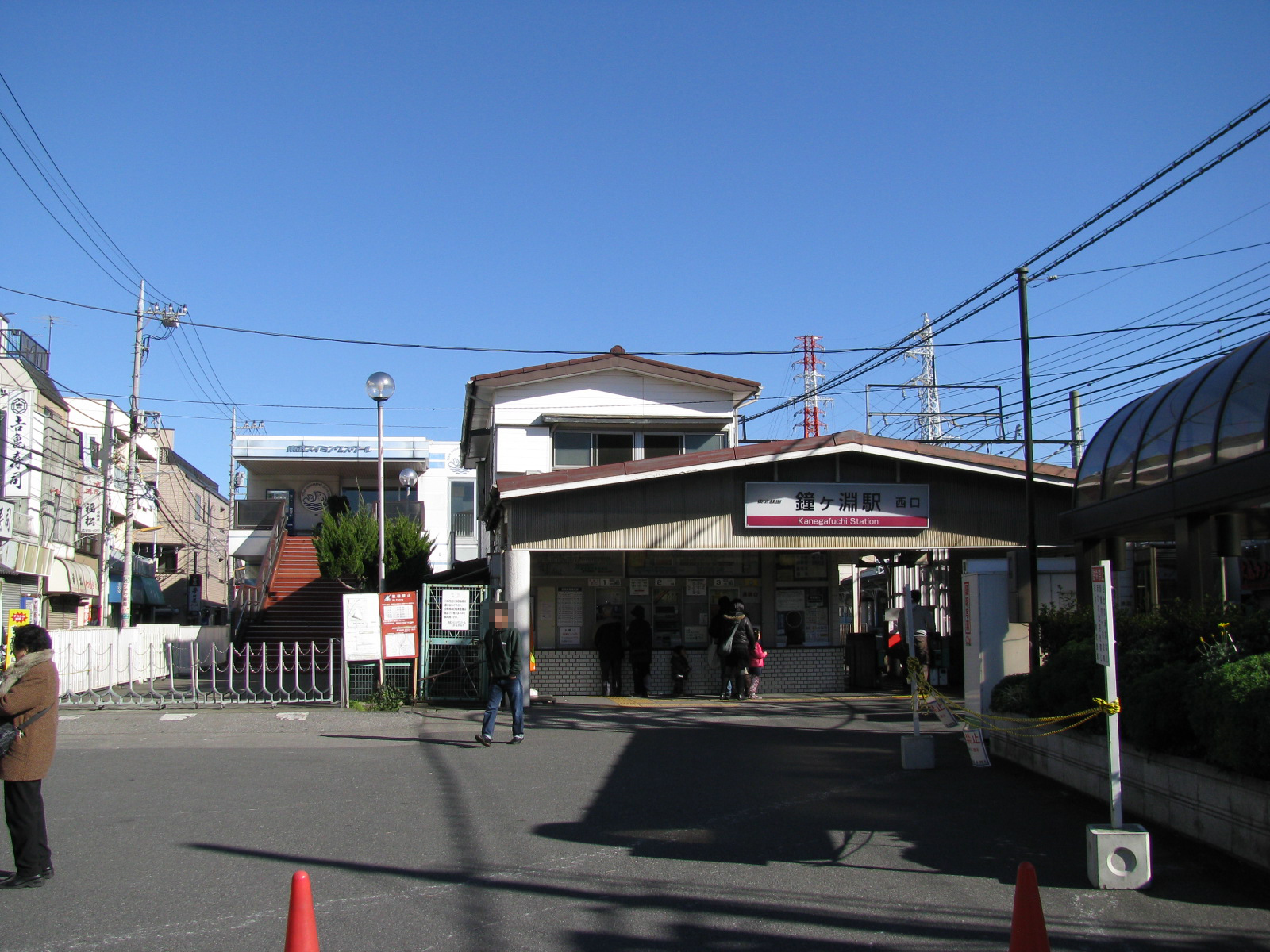
The west entrance in January 2008

The station opened on 1 April 1902.

From 17 March 2012, station numbering was introduced on all Tobu lines, with Kanegafuchi Station becoming "TS-06".

== Passenger statistics ==
In fiscal 2024, the station was used by an average of 6,526 passengers daily (boarding passengers only).

== Surrounding area ==
- Arakawa River
- Sumida River
- Sumidagawa Shrine
- Mokuboji Temple

== See also ==
- List of railway stations in Japan
