= Yashio Station =

Railway station in Yashio, Saitama Prefecture, Japan

Yashio Station 八潮駅
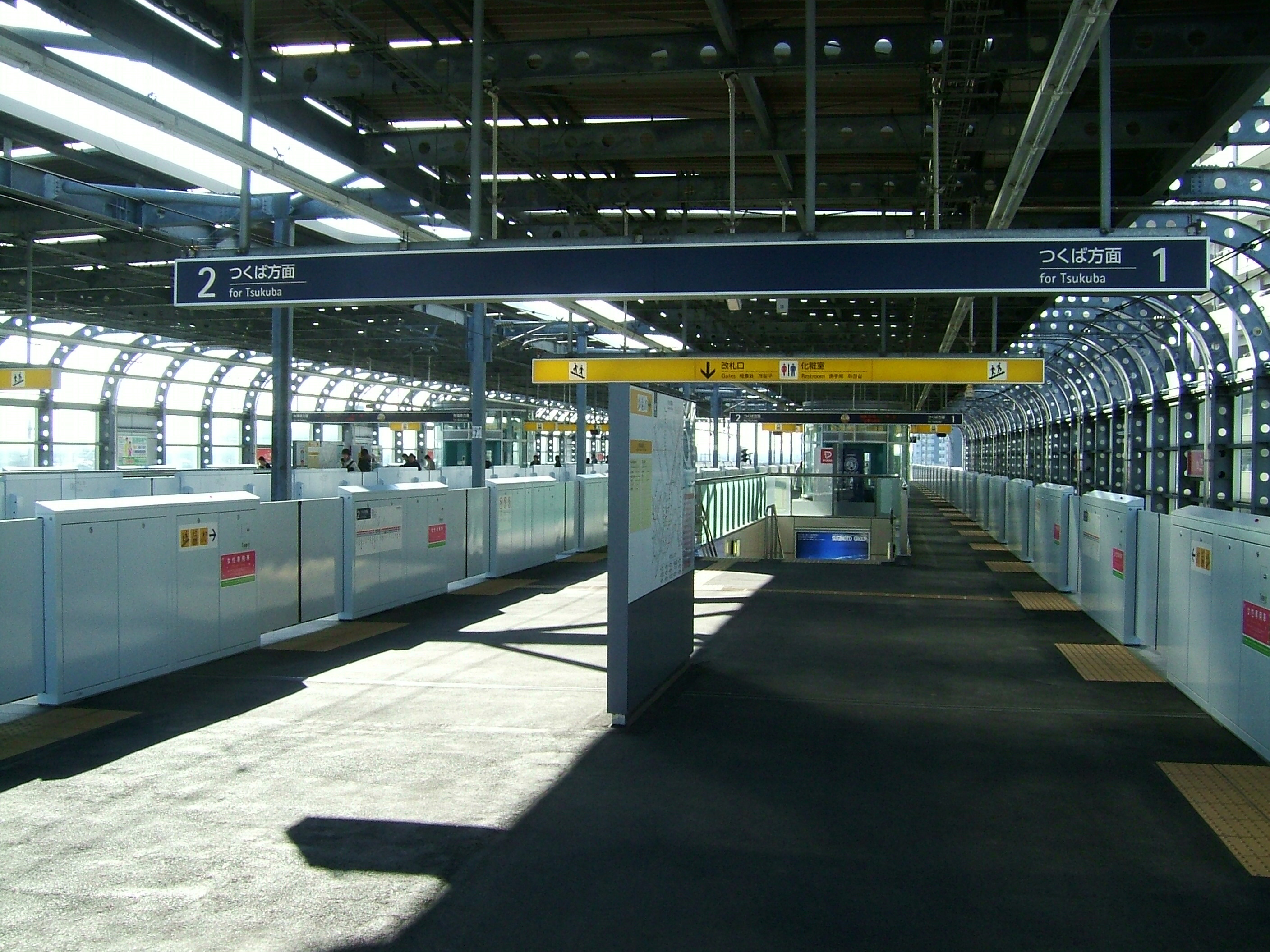
- Platform level of Yashio Station, 2008

General information
- Location: 6-5-1 Oze, Yashio-shi, Saitama-ken 340-0822; Japan
- Coordinates: 35°48′27.21″N 139°50′40.23″E
- Operator: Metropolitan Intercity Railway Company
- Line: ■Tsukuba Express
- Distance: 15.6 km (9.7 mi) from Akihabara
- Platforms: 4 (2 island platforms)

Construction
- Structure type: Elevated
- Accessible: Yes

Other information
- Status: Staffed
- Station code: TX08
- Website: Official website

History
- Opened: 24 August 2005

Passengers
- FY2019: 24,809 daily

Services
Preceding station	Tsukuba Express	Following station
Kita-Senju (TX05) towards Akihabara	Tsukuba Express Rapid	Minami-Nagareyama (TX10) towards Tsukuba
Rokuchō (TX07) towards Akihabara	Tsukuba Express Commuter-Rapid	Minami-Nagareyama (TX10) towards Tsukuba
Rokuchō (TX07) towards Akihabara	Tsukuba Express Semi-Rapid Local	Misato-chūō (TX09) towards Tsukuba
Location
- Location within Saitama Prefecture Location within Japan

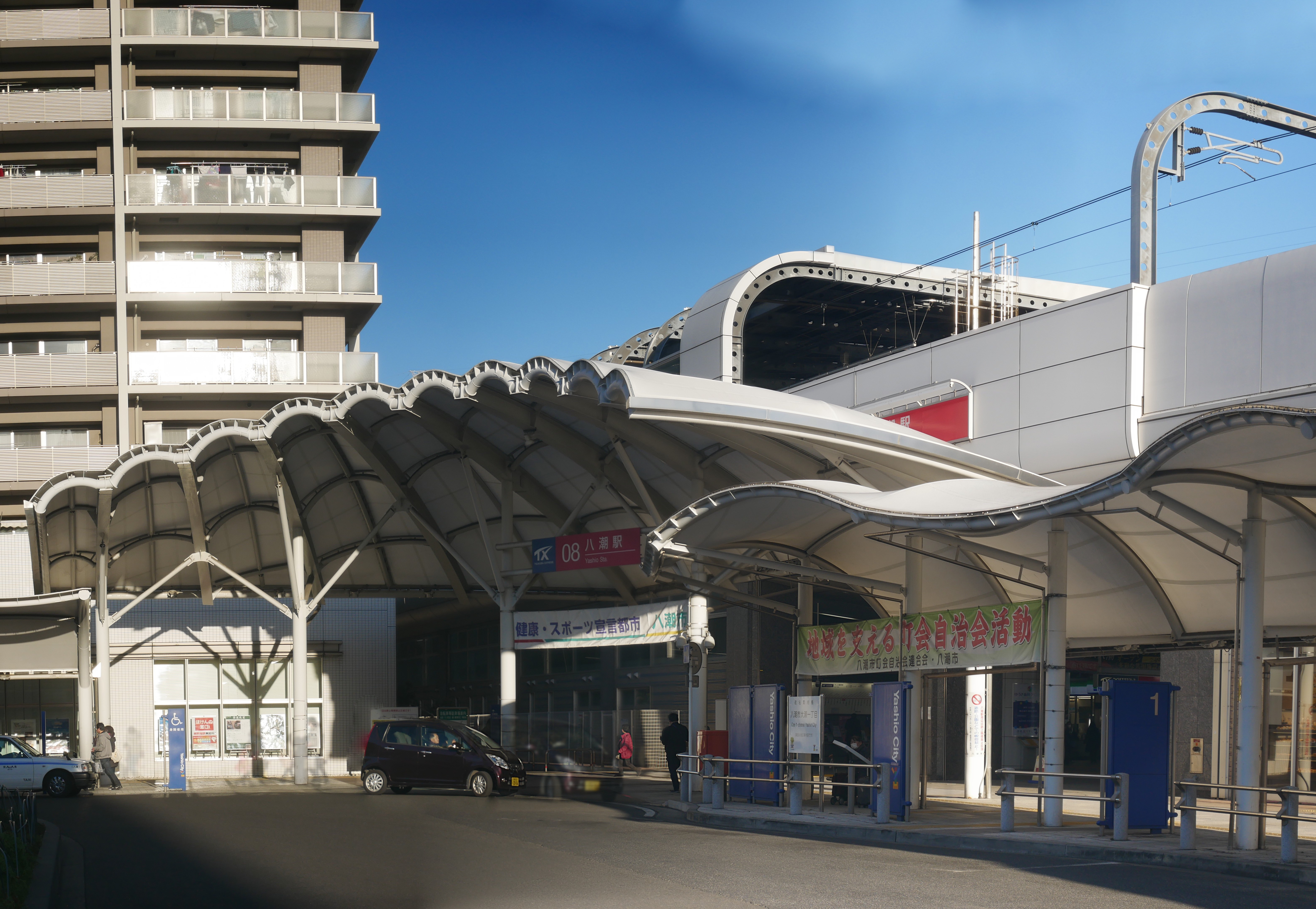
Station building, 2019

Yashio Station (八潮駅, Yashio-eki) is a passenger railway station located in the city of Yashio, Saitama, Japan, operated by the Metropolitan Intercity Railway Company. Its station number is TX08.

== Lines ==
Yashio Station is served by the Tsukuba Express, and is located 15.6 km (9.7 mi) from the terminus of the line at Akihabara.

== Station layout ==
The station consists of two elevated island platforms serving four tracks, with the station building underneath. Trains generally stop at the outer platforms (1 and 4), but when a faster train stops or passes through the station, the inner platforms are used to hold the slower trains. Yashio is one of three stations on the Tsukuba Express (Nagareyama-ōtakanomori and Moriya) where parallel tracks allow for trains traveling in the same direction to pass each other. Some trains terminate at Yashio Station, especially during the morning commuter rush between Yashio and the Akihabara terminal. Immediately north of the station are four tracks that can hold trains as they are taken out of service, or put into service.

=== Platforms ===
1,2	■ Tsukuba Express	for Tsukuba
3,4	■ Tsukuba Express	for Akihabara

== History ==
The station opened on 24 August 2005, coinciding with the opening of the Tsukuba Express line.

Effective the timetable revision on 16 March 2024, Yashio became a station on the Rapid service.

== Passenger statistics ==
In fiscal 2019, the station was used by an average of 24,809 passengers daily (boarding passengers only).

== Surrounding area ==
- Metropolitan Expressway No. 6 Misato Line Yashio PA
- Yashio City Ose Elementary School
- Yashio City Ohara Junior High School

== See also ==
- List of railway stations in Japan
