= Ohanajaya Station =

Railway station in Tokyo, Japan

Coordinates: 35.7476°N 139.8402°E

KS08 Ohanajaya Station お花茶屋駅
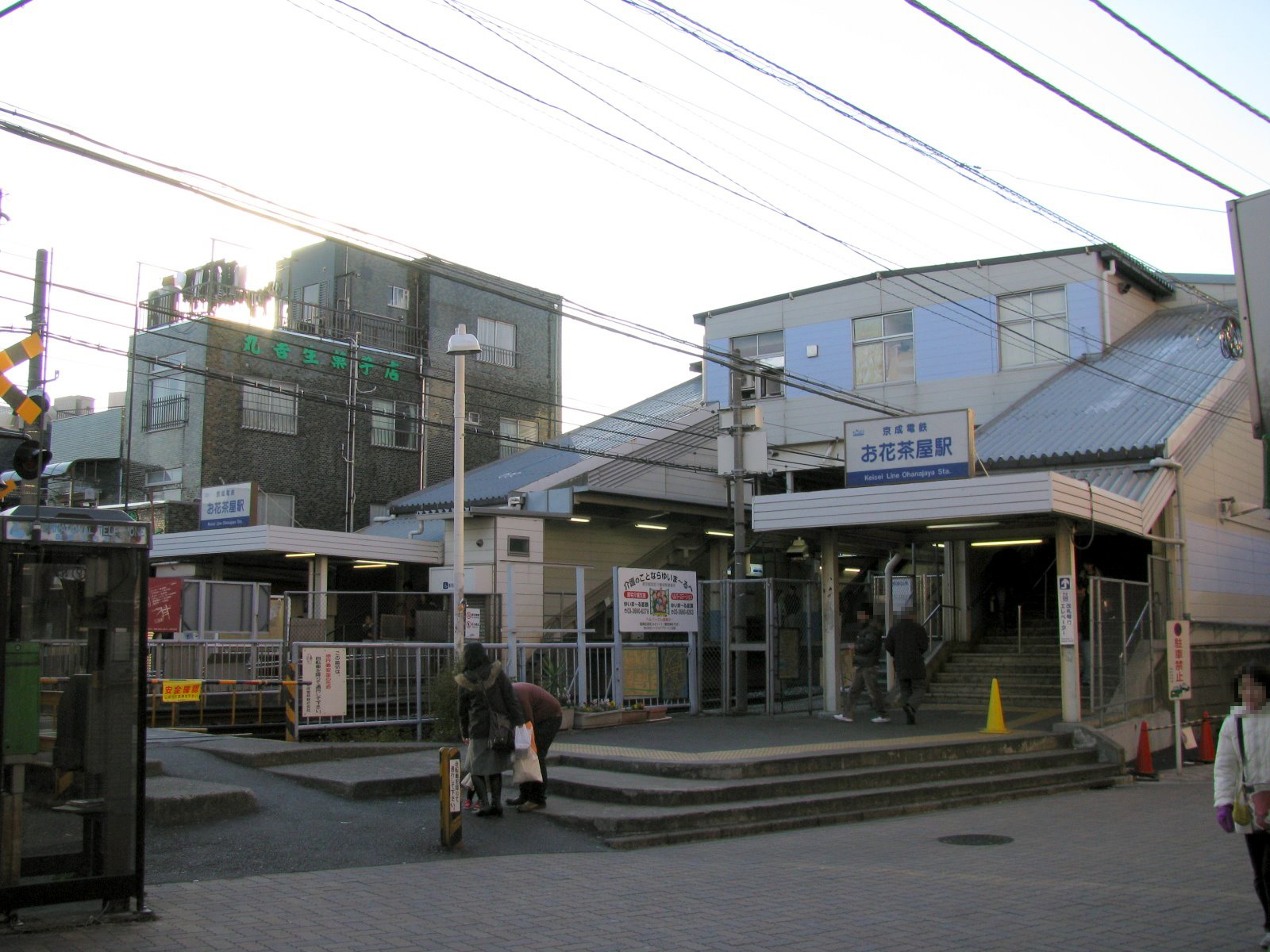
- Ohanajaya Station, January 2008

General information
- Location: 2-37-1 Takaramachi, Katsushika, Tokyo; Japan
- Operator: Keisei Electric Railway
- Line: Keisei Main Line

Other information
- Station code: KS08

History
- Opened: December 19, 1931

Passengers
- FY2015: 31,679 daily

Services
Preceding station	Keisei	Following station
Horikirishōbuen KS07 towards Keisei Ueno	Main Line Local	Aoto KS09 towards Narita Airport Terminal 1
Location

Ohanajaya Station (お花茶屋駅, Ohanajaya-eki) is a railway station on the Keisei Main Line in Katsushika, Tokyo, Japan, operated by the private railway operator Keisei Electric Railway.

== Lines ==
Ohanajaya Station is served by the Keisei Main Line.

== Layout ==
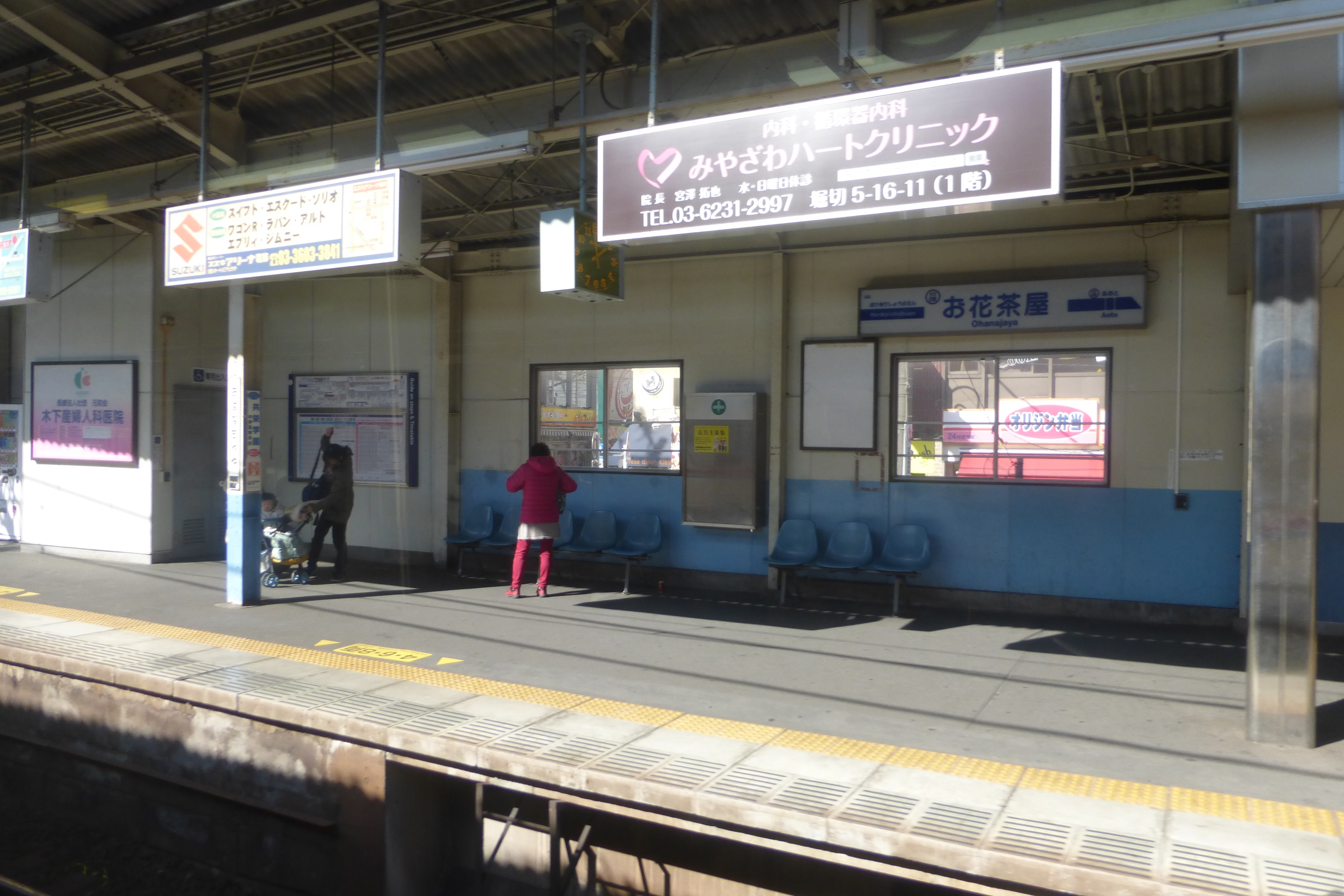
The platform, March 2015

The station consists of two side platforms serving two tracks.

=== Platforms ===
1	Keisei Main Line	for Keisei Ueno
2	Keisei Main Line	for Keisei Takasago, Keisei Kanamachi, Keisei Funabashi, Keisei Chiba, and Keisei Narita

== History ==
Ohanajaya Station opened on 19 December 1931.

Station numbering was introduced to all Keisei Line stations on 17 June 2010. Ohanajaya was assigned station number KS08.

== See also ==
- List of railway stations in Japan
