= Horikiri Station =

Railway station in Tokyo, Japan

Coordinates: 35.7428°N 139.8178°E

TS07 Horikiri Station 堀切駅
- The west-side station building in May 2023

General information
- Location: Adachi, Tokyo; Japan
- Operator: Tobu Railway
- Line: Tobu Skytree Line

History
- Opened: 1902

Passengers
- FY2024: 2,119 daily boardings

Services
Preceding station	Tobu Railway	Following station
Kanegafuchi TS06 towards Asakusa	Tobu Skytree Line Section Express Section Semi Express Local	Ushida TS08 towards Tōbu-Dōbutsu-Kōen
Location

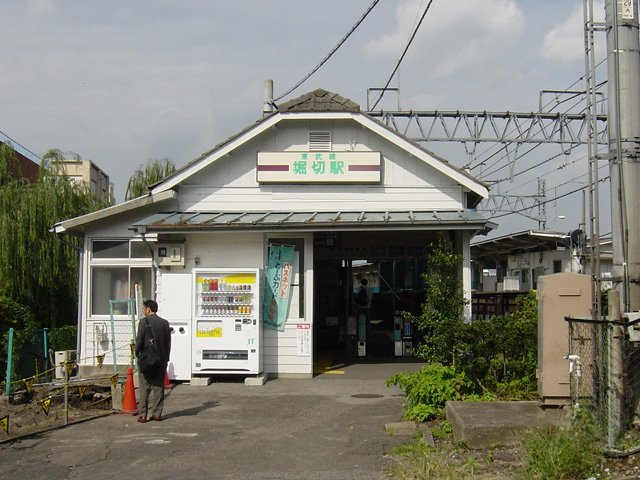
Horikiri Station in 2004

Horikiri Station (堀切駅, Horikiri-eki) is a railway station on the Tobu Skytree Line in Adachi, Tokyo, Japan, operated by the private railway operator Tobu Railway.

== Lines ==
Horikiri Station is served by the Tobu Skytree Line, and is located 5.3 km from the Tokyo terminus at Asakusa.

== Station layout ==
This station consists of two opposite side platforms serving two tracks.

=== Platforms ===
1	Tobu Skytree Line	for Kita-Senju, Kasukabe, Tōbu-Dōbutsu-Kōen, Kuki, and Minami-Kurihashi
2	Tobu Skytree Line	for Asakusa

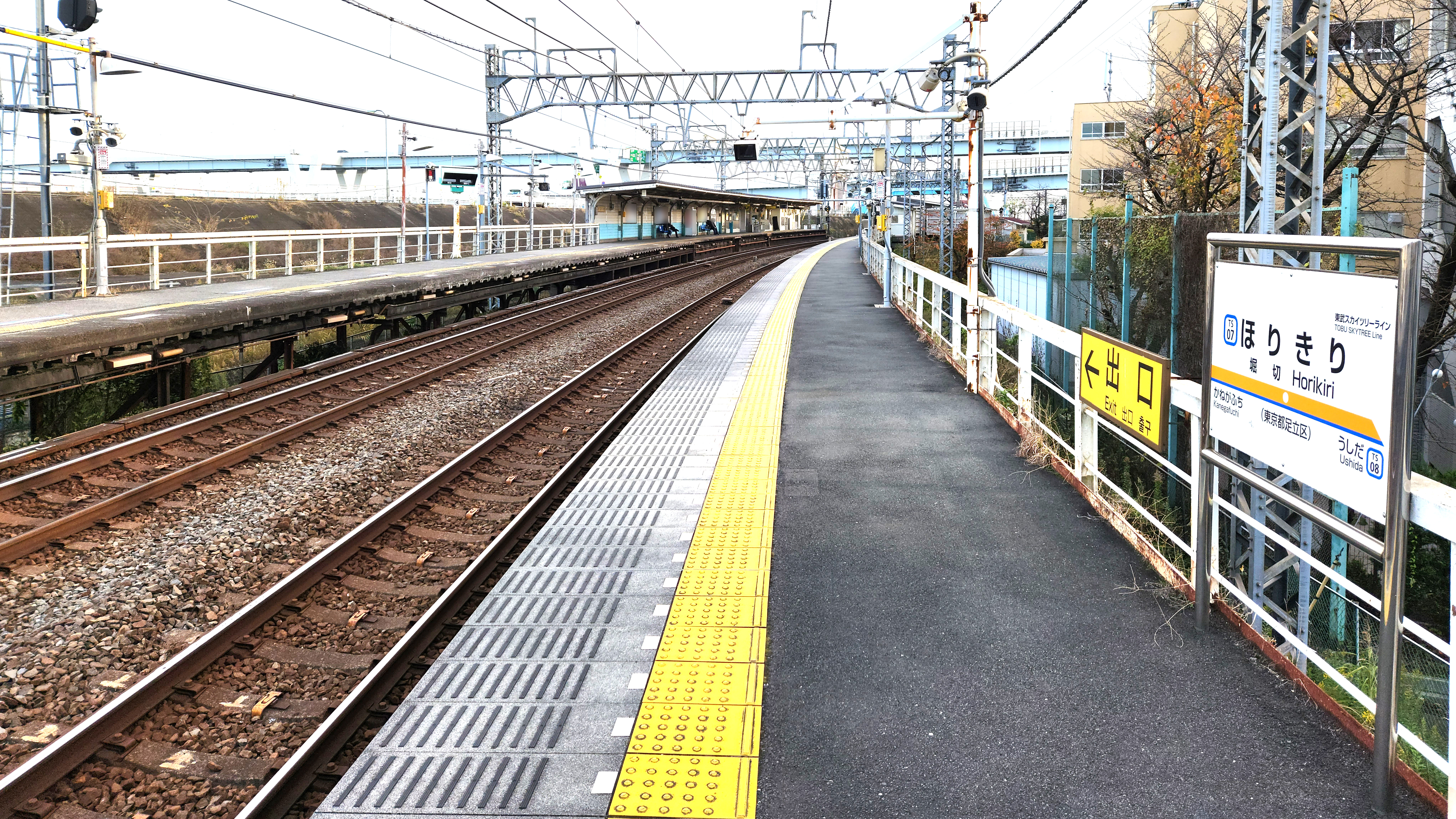
The platforms in December 2022

== History ==
The station opened on 1 April 1902.

== Passenger statistics ==
In fiscal 2024, the station was used by an average of 2,119 passengers daily (boarding passengers only).
