= Rokuchō Station =

Railway station in Tokyo, Japan

Coordinates: 35°47′6.04″N 139°49′18.68″E

Rokuchō Station 六町駅
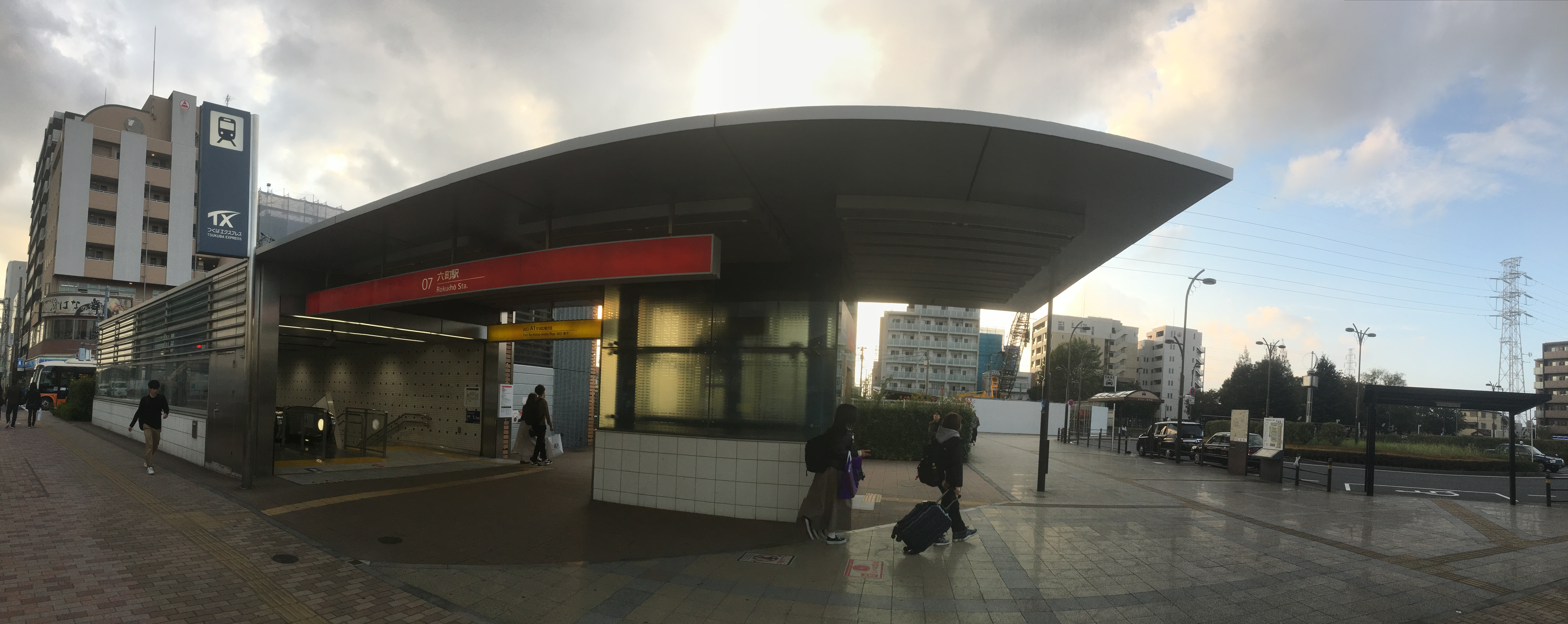
- Entrance of Rokuchō Station, 2019

General information
- Location: Adachi, Tokyo; Japan
- Operator: Metropolitan Intercity Railway Company
- Line: Tsukuba Express
- Platforms: 2 (1 island platform)

Construction
- Structure type: Underground
- Accessible: Yes

Other information
- Station code: TX07

History
- Opened: 24 August 2005

Services
Preceding station	Tsukuba Express	Following station
Kita-Senju (TX05) towards Akihabara	Tsukuba Express Commuter-Rapid	Yashio (TX08) towards Tsukuba
Kita-Senju (TX05) towards Akihabara	Tsukuba Express Semi-Rapid	Yashio (TX08) One-way operation
Aoi (TX06) towards Akihabara	Tsukuba Express Local	Yashio (TX08) towards Tsukuba
Location

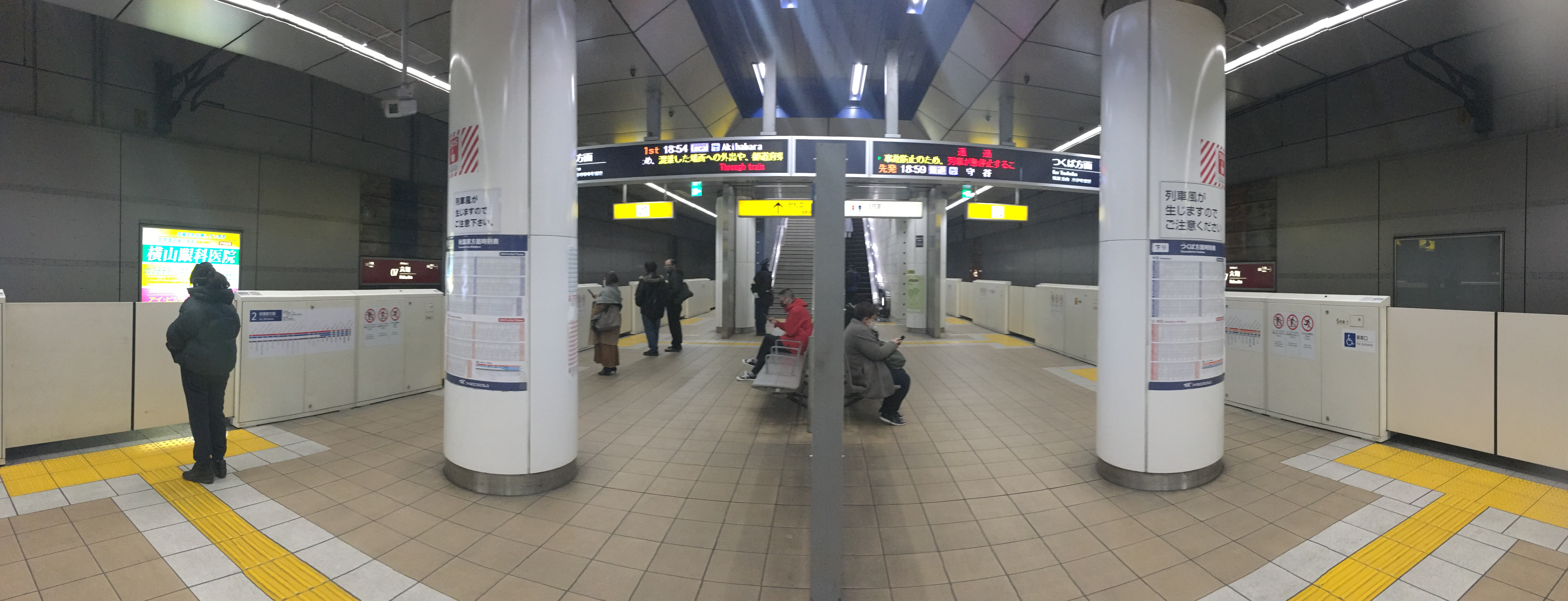
Platforms, 2022

Rokuchō Station (六町駅, Rokuchō-eki) is a railway station in Adachi, Tokyo Prefecture, Japan. Its station number is TX07. The station opened on 24 August 2005.

== Line ==
Rokuchō Station is served by the following line:

- Metropolitan Intercity Railway Company
  - Tsukuba Express

== Station layout ==
The station consists of a single underground island platform.

Platforms

1	TX Tsukuba Express	Trains in the direction of Tsukuba
2	TX Tsukuba Express	Trains in the direction of Akihabara
