= Keisei Sekiya Station =

Railway station in Tokyo, Japan

Coordinates: 35.7439°N 139.8118°E

KS06 Keisei Sekiya Station 京成関屋駅
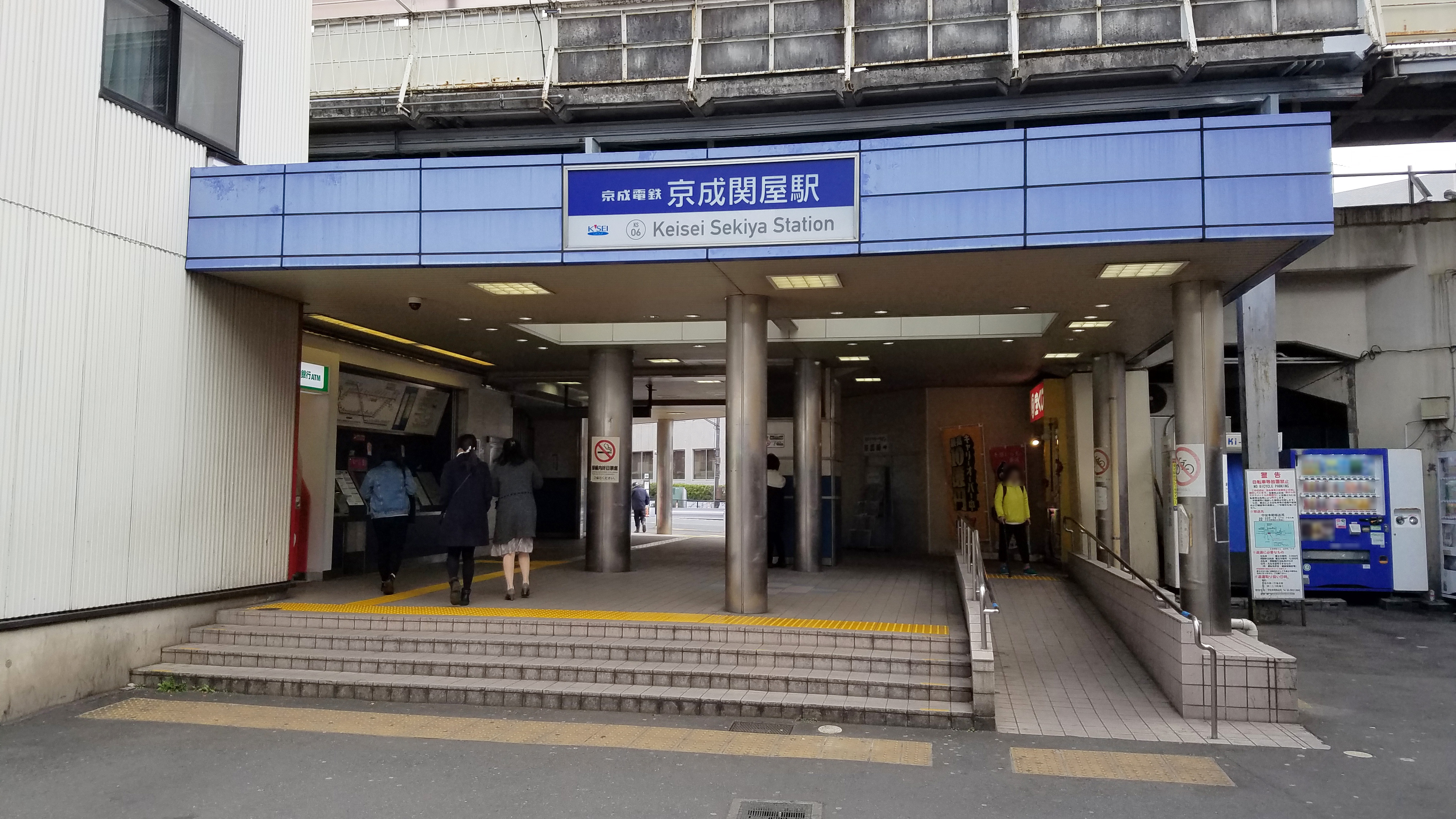
- The station entrance in March 2017

General information
- Location: 2–2 Senju-akebono-cho, Adachi-ku, Tokyo; Japan
- Operator: Keisei Electric Railway
- Line: Keisei Main Line
- Distance: 7.3 km from Keisei Ueno
- Platforms: 2 side platforms
- Tracks: 2
- Connections: TS08 Ushida Station

Other information
- Station code: KS06
- Website: Official website

History
- Opened: 19 December 1931

Passengers
- FY2015: 24,942 daily

Services
Preceding station	Keisei	Following station
Senjuōhashi KS05 towards Keisei Ueno	Main Line Local	Horikirishōbuen KS07 towards Narita Airport Terminal 1
Location
- Location within Tokyo

Keisei Sekiya Station (京成関屋駅, Keisei Sekiya-eki) is a railway station on the Keisei Main Line in Adachi, Tokyo, Japan, operated by the private railway operator Keisei Electric Railway.

== Lines ==
Keisei Sekiya Station is served by the Keisei Main Line, and is located 7.3 km from the Tokyo terminus at Keisei-Ueno. The station is close to Ushida Station on the Tobu Skytree Line.

== Station layout ==
This station consists of two side platforms serving two tracks.

=== Platforms ===
1	Keisei Main Line	for Keisei Ueno
2	Keisei Main Line	for Keisei Takasago, Keisei Kanamachi, Keisei Funabashi, Keisei Chiba, and Keisei Narita

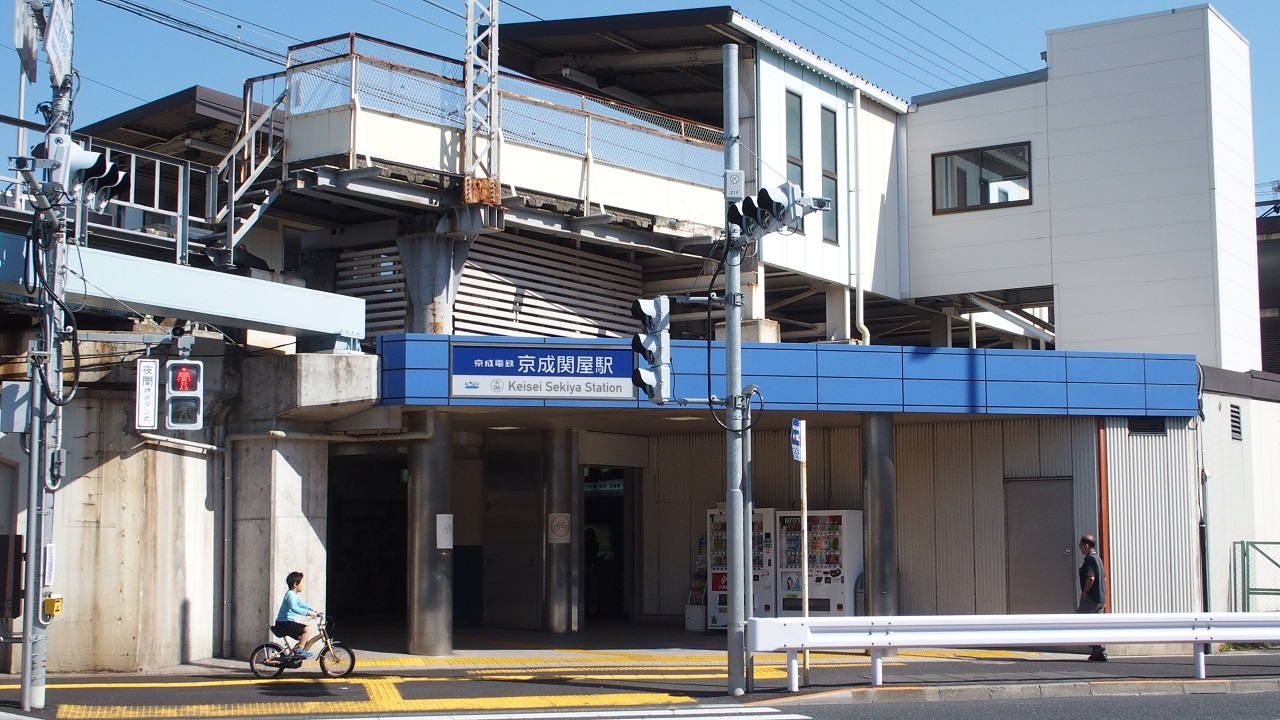
The south entrance in October 2014

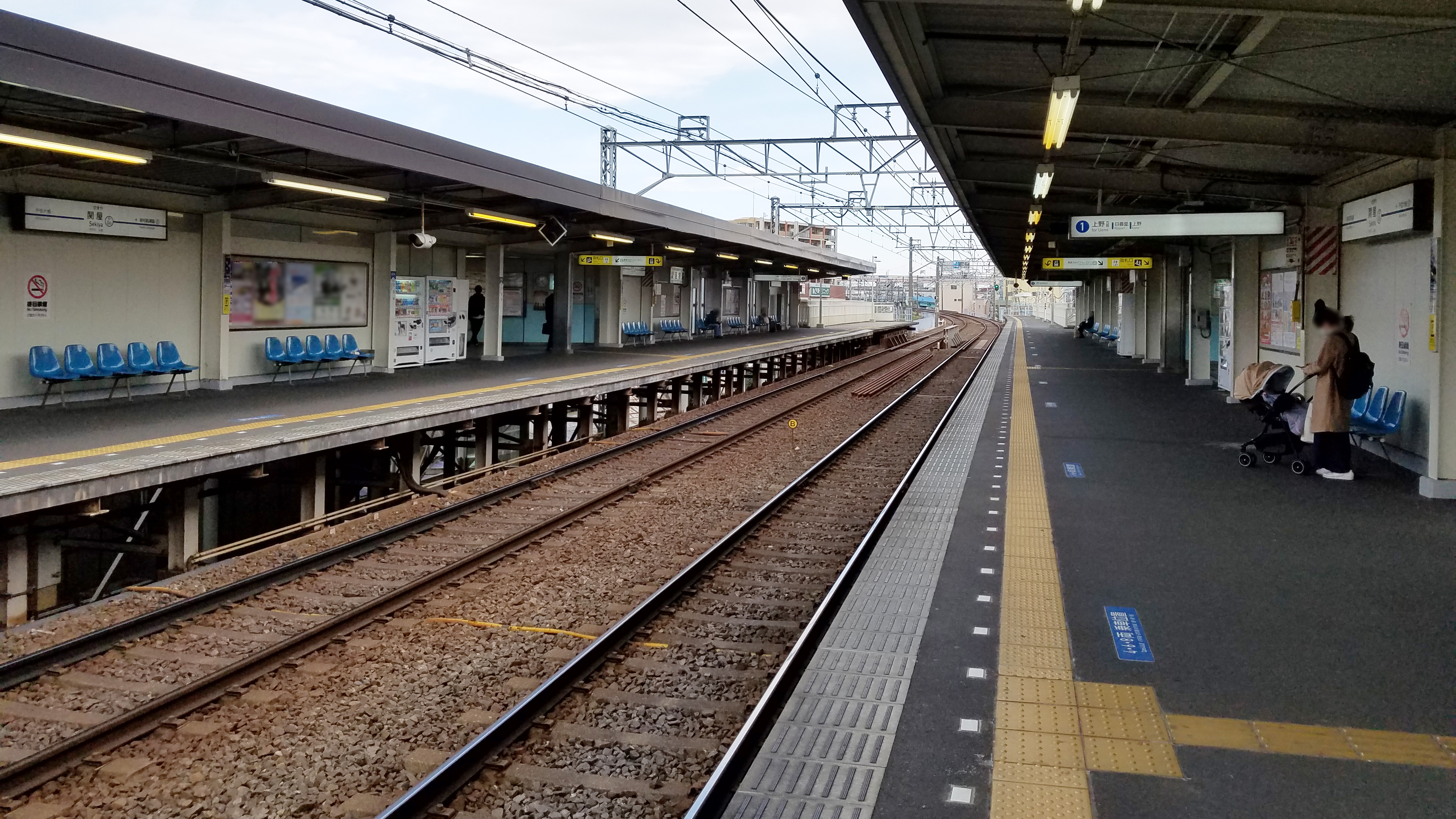
The platforms in March 2017

== History ==
The station opened on 19 December 1931.

Station numbering was introduced to all Keisei Line stations on 17 July 2010. Keisei Sekiya was assigned station number KS06.

== Surrounding area ==
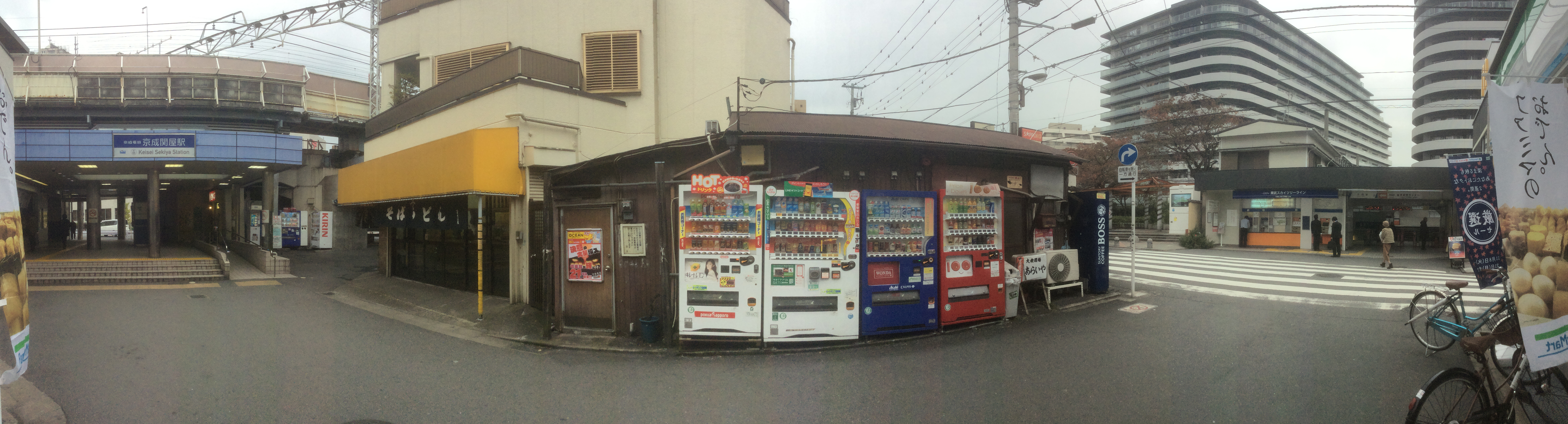
A panoramic view showing the close distance between Keisei Sekiya and Ushida stations in November 2016

- Ushida Station on the Tobu Skytree Line

== See also ==
- List of railway stations in Japan
