= Ushida Station (Tokyo) =

Railway station in Tokyo, Japan

Coordinates: 35.7444°N 139.8113°E

TS08 Ushida Station 牛田駅
- Station front, 2026.

General information
- Location: Adachi, Tokyo; Japan
- Operator: Tobu Railway
- Line: Tobu Skytree Line
- Connections: KS06 Keisei Sekiya Station

History
- Opened: 1932

Passengers
- FY2024: 10,438 daily boardings

Services
Preceding station	Tobu Railway	Following station
Horikiri TS07 towards Asakusa	Tobu Skytree Line Section Express Section Semi Express Local	Kita-Senju TS09 towards Tōbu-Dōbutsu-Kōen
Location

Ushida Station (牛田駅, Ushida-eki) is a railway station on the Tobu Skytree Line in Adachi, Tokyo, Japan, operated by the private railway operator Tobu Railway.

== Lines ==
Ushida Station is served by the Tobu Skytree Line, and is located 6.0 km from the Tokyo terminus at Asakusa.

The station is close to Keisei Sekiya Station on the Keisei Main Line, so it is possible to transfer to Keisei Main Line.

== Station layout ==
This station consists of two opposite side platforms serving two tracks.

=== Platforms ===
1	Tobu Skytree Line	for Kita-Senju, Kasukabe, Tōbu-Dōbutsu-Kōen, Kuki, and Minami-Kurihashi
2	Tobu Skytree Line	for Asakusa

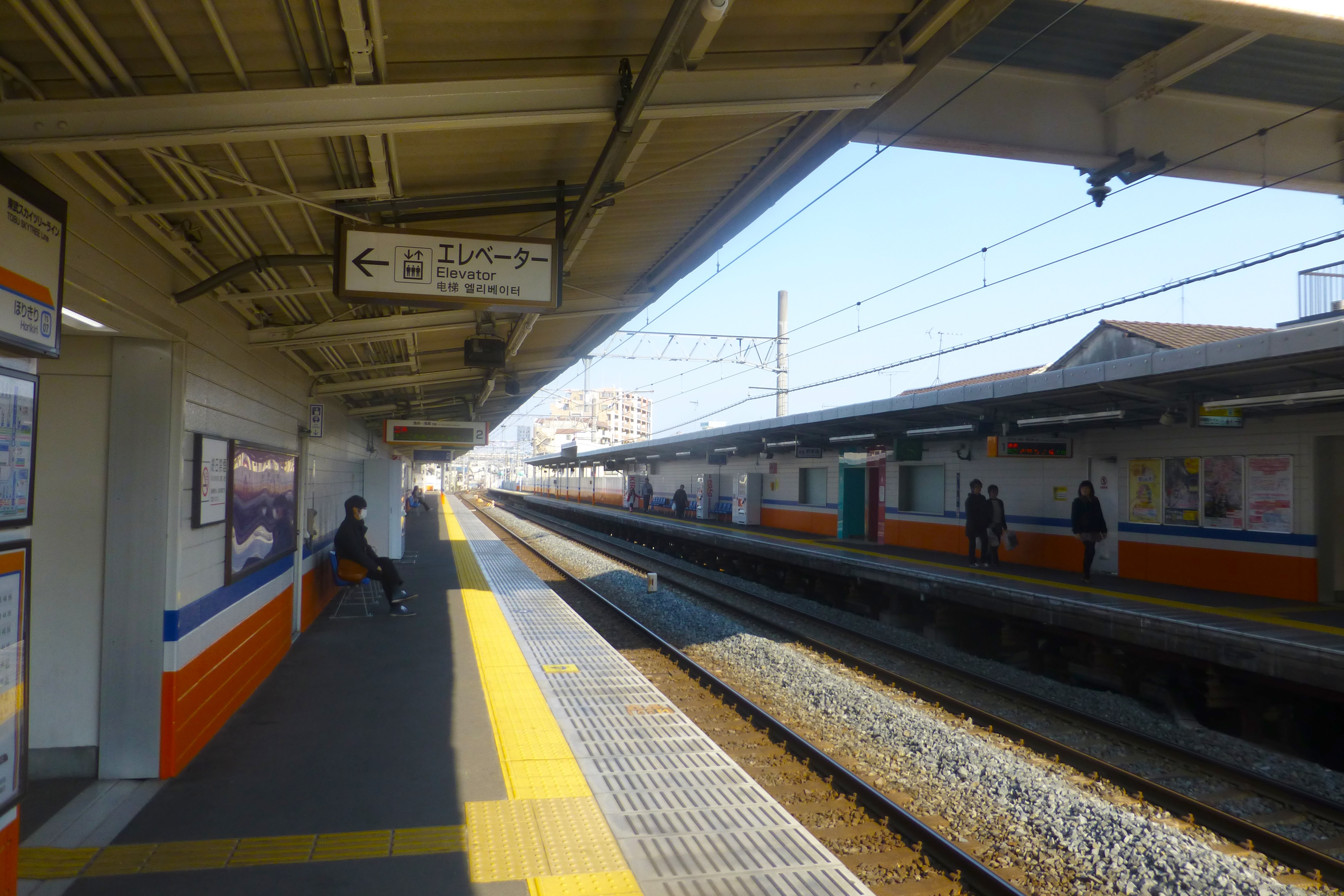
The station platforms in March 2014

== History ==
The station opened on 1 September 1932.

== Passenger statistics ==
In fiscal 2024, the station was used by an average of 10,438 passengers daily (boarding passengers only).

== Surrounding area ==
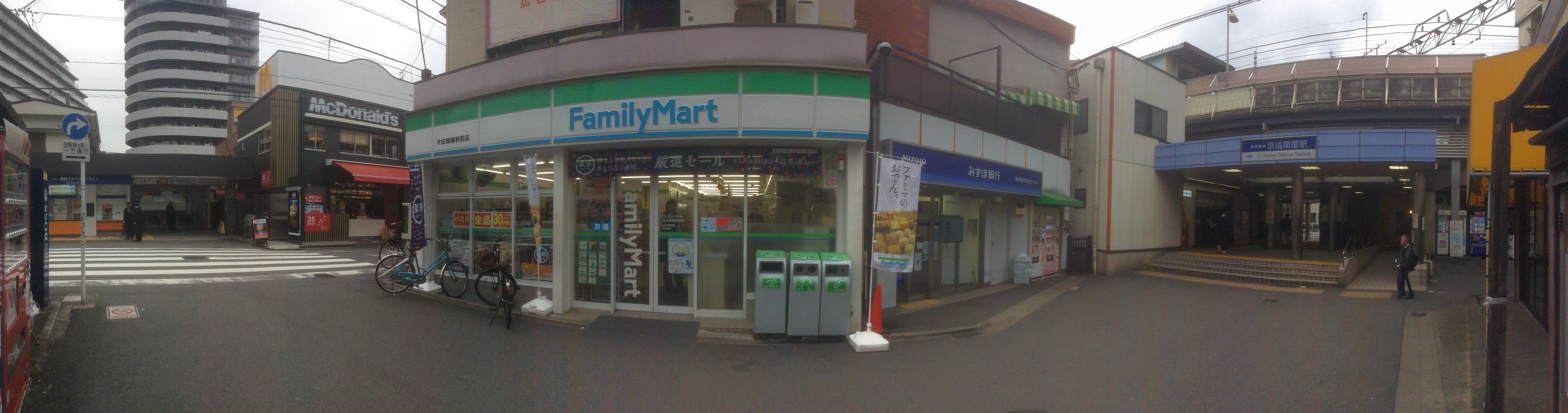
A panoramic view showing the close distance between Keisei Sekiya and Ushida stations in November 2016

- Keisei Sekiya Station (on the Keisei Main Line)
