= Aoi Station =

Railway station in Tokyo, Japan

Aoi Station 青井駅
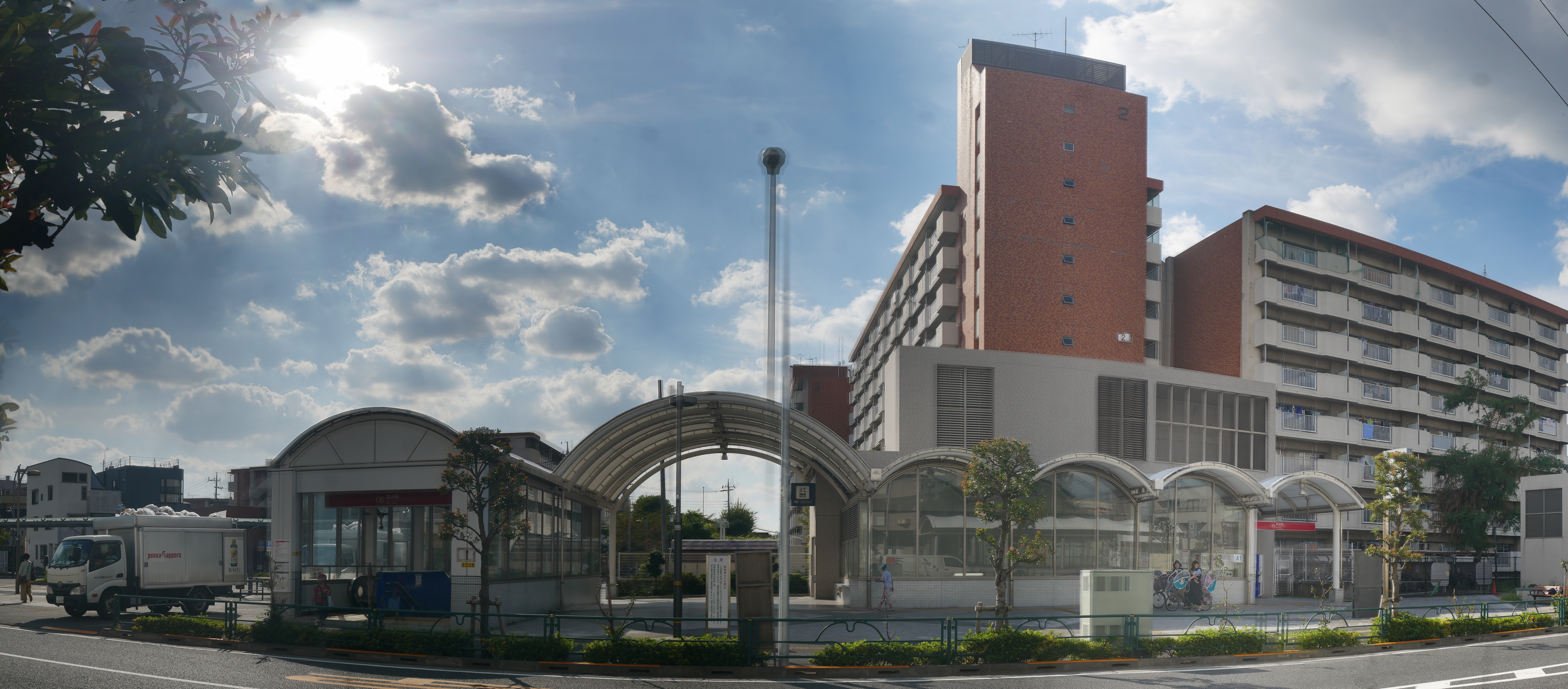
- The station entrance, September 2019

General information
- Location: 3-24-1 Aoi, Adachi, Tokyo （足立区青井3丁目24-1） Japan
- Coordinates: 35°46′19.2″N 139°49′13.5″E
- Operator: Metropolitan Intercity Railway Company
- Line: Tsukuba Express
- Platforms: 2 (2 side platforms)

Construction
- Structure type: Underground
- Accessible: Yes

Other information
- Station code: TX06

History
- Opened: 2005

Services
Preceding station	Tsukuba Express	Following station
Kita-Senju (TX05) towards Akihabara	Tsukuba Express Local	Rokuchō (TX07) towards Tsukuba
Location

Aoi Station (青井駅, Aoi-eki) is a railway station on the Tsukuba Express line in Adachi, Tokyo, Japan, operated by the third-sector railway operating company Metropolitan Intercity Railway Company.

== Line ==
Aoi Station is served by the 58.3 km (36.2 mi) Tsukuba Express line from Akihabara Station in Tokyo to Tsukuba Station in Ibaraki Prefecture. It is numbered "TX06".

== Station layout ==
The station has two underground side platforms serving two tracks.

=== Platforms ===
1	■ Tsukuba Express	for Tsukuba
2	■ Tsukuba Express	for Akihabara

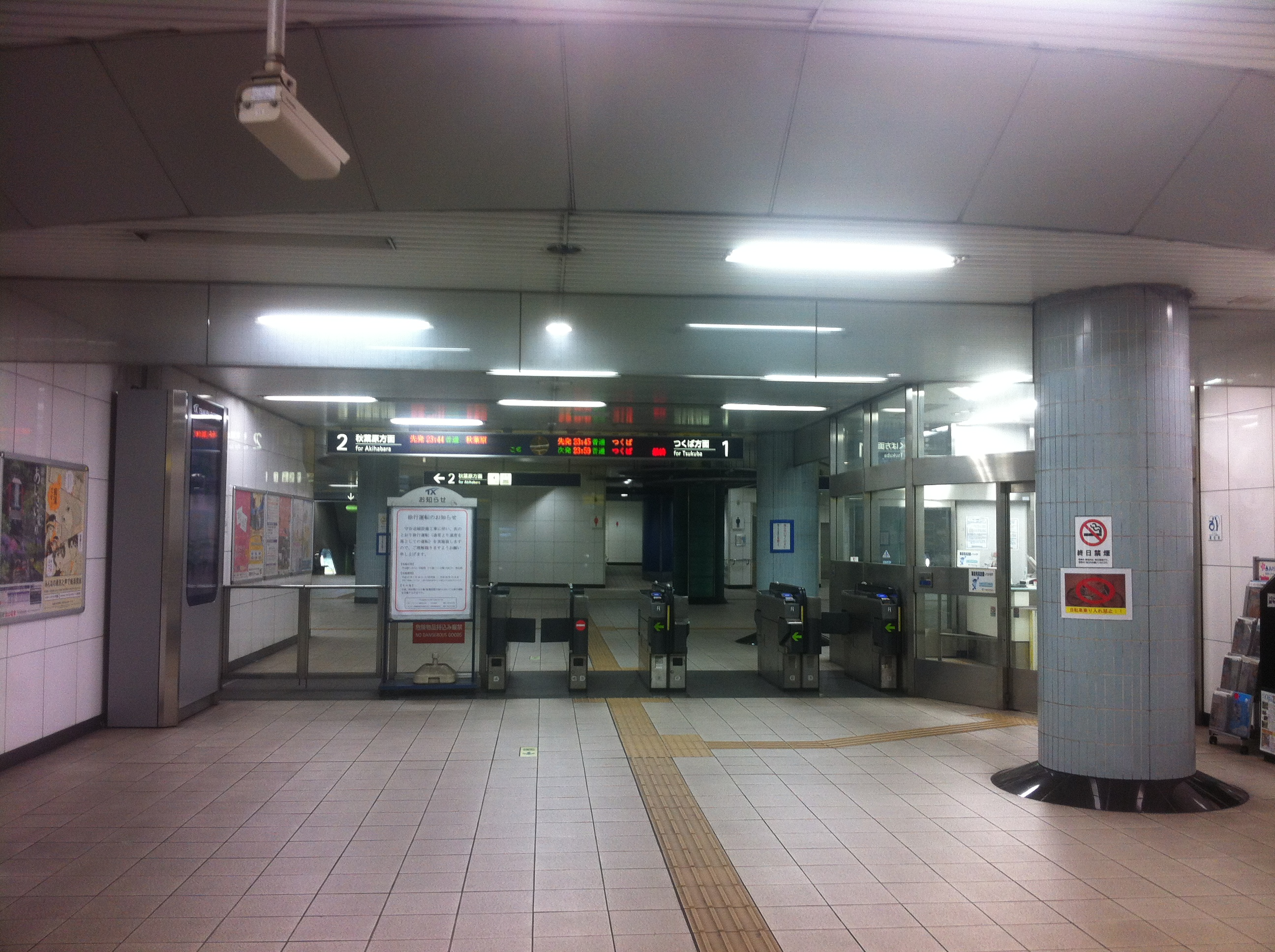
The ticket barriers, May 2015

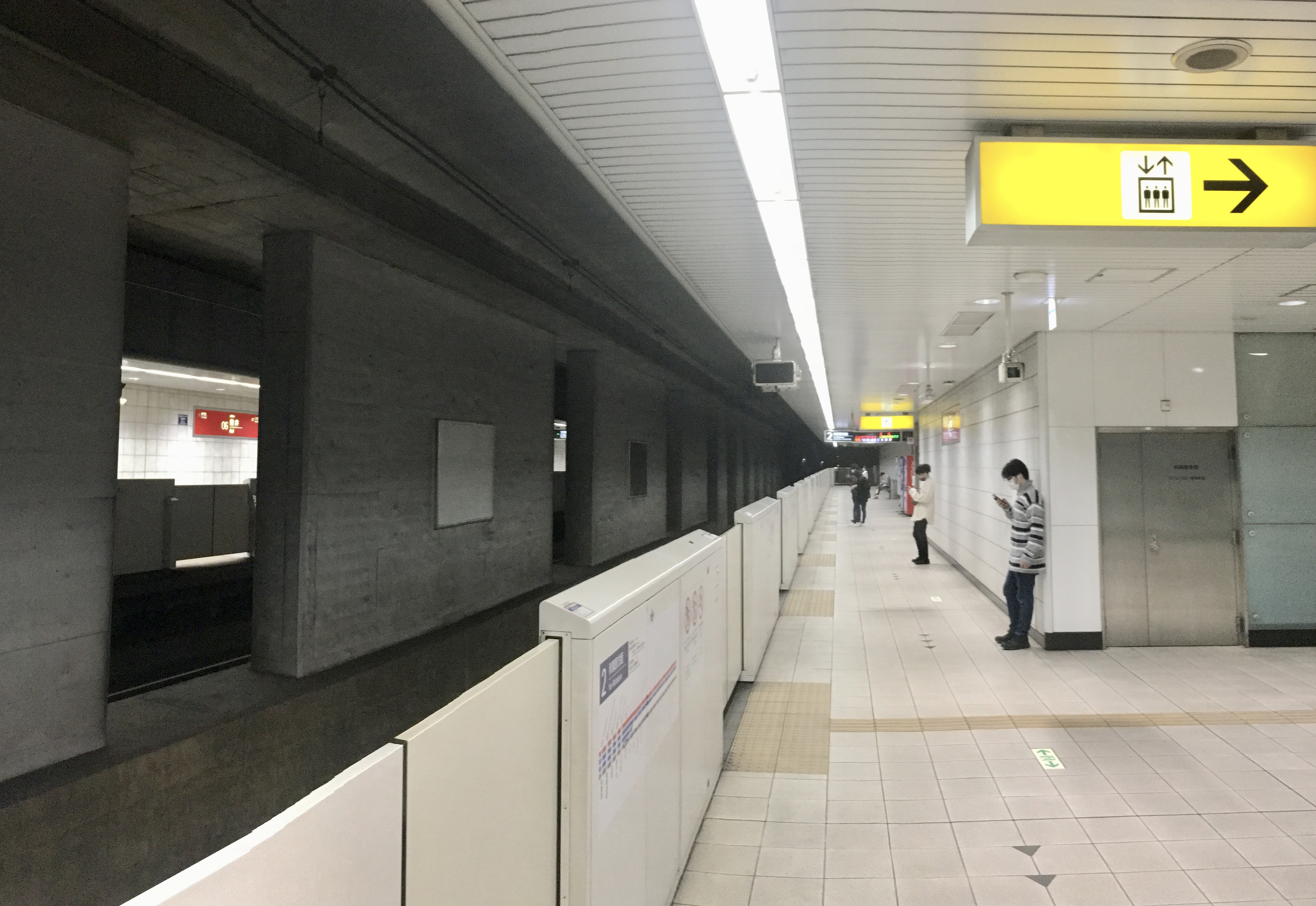
The platforms, May 2022

== History ==
The station opened on 24 August 2005.
