= Kita-Senju Station =

Railway and metro station in Tokyo, Japan

Coordinates: 35.749407°N 139.805102°E

JJ05 TS09 Kita-Senju Station 北千住駅

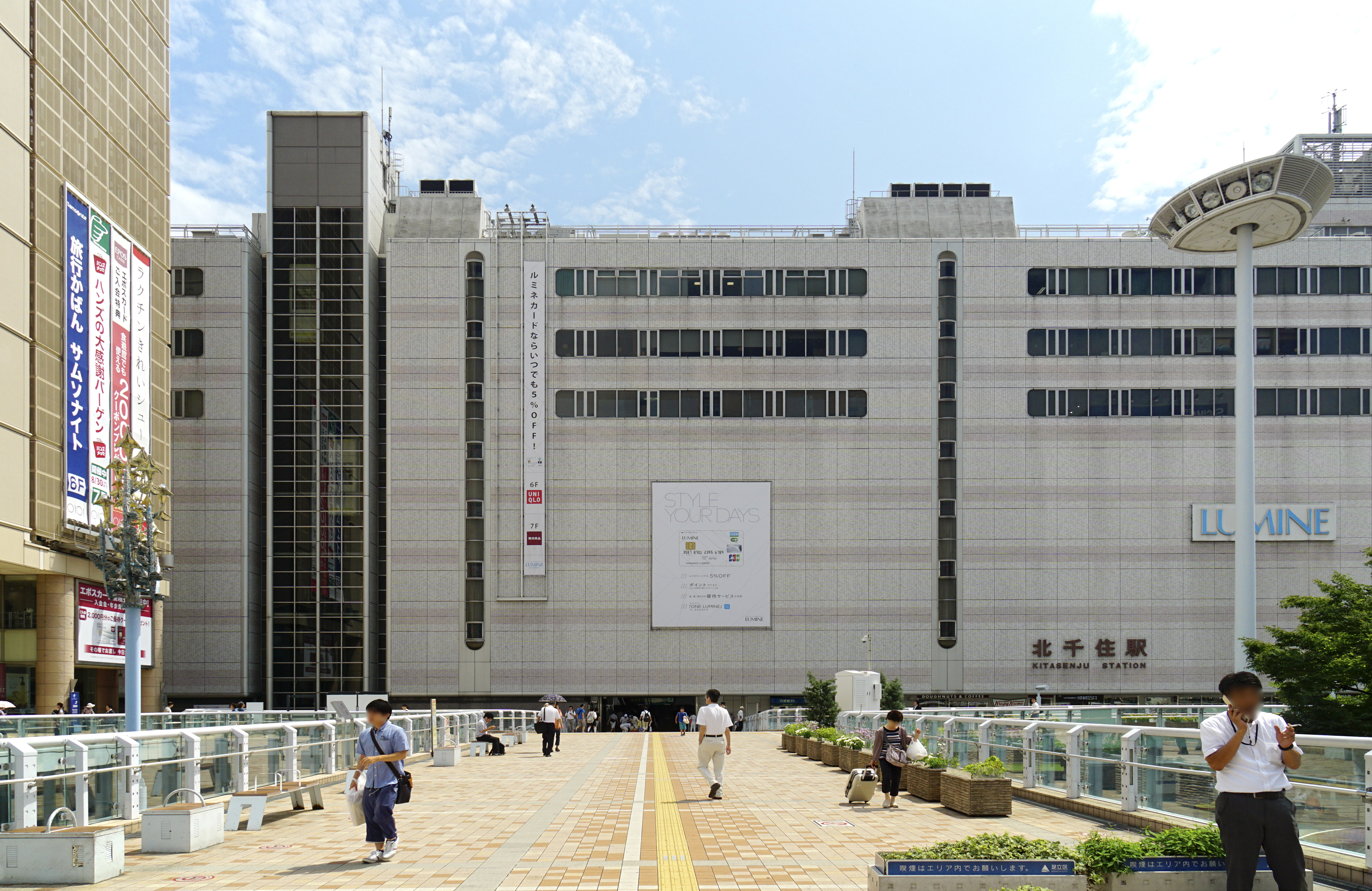
- The west side of Kita-Senju Station in August 2017

General information
- Location: Adachi, Tokyo; Japan
- Operator: JR East; Tobu Railway; Tokyo Metro; Metropolitan Intercity Railway Company
- Lines: Joban Line (Rapid); Tobu Skytree Line; Hibiya Line; Chiyoda Line; Tsukuba Express

Other information
- Station code: H-22, C-18, 05, TS-09

History
- Opened: December 25, 1896 (JR East); August 27, 1899 (Tobu Railway); December 20, 1969 (Tokyo Metro); August 24, 2005 (Metropolitan Intercity Railway Company)

Passengers
- JR East, FY2013: 203,428 daily

Services
Preceding station	JR East	Following station
Nippori towards Shinagawa	Jōban Line Special Rapid	Matsudo JJ06 towards Tsuchiura
Minami-Senju JJ04 towards Shinagawa	Jōban Line (Rapid) Rapid	Matsudo JJ06 towards Toride
Minami-Senju JJ04 towards Shinagawa	Jōban Line Local-Futsuu	Matsudo JJ06 towards Sendai
Other services
Preceding station	Tobu Railway	Following station
Tokyo Skytree TS02 towards Asakusa	Spacia X	Kasukabe TS27 towards Tōbu–Nikkō or Kinugawa–Onsen
Hikifune TS04 towards Asakusa	Kegon	Kasukabe TS27 towards Tōbu–Nikkō
Hikifune TS04 towards Asakusa	Kinu	Kasukabe TS27 towards Kinugawa–Onsen
Tokyo Skytree TS02 towards Asakusa	Aizu	Kasukabe TS27 towards Shin-Fujiwara
Hikifune TS04 towards Asakusa	Ryomo	Tōbu-Dōbutsu-Kōen TS30 towards Kuzū, Akagi or Isesaki
Hikifune TS04 towards Asakusa	Skytree Liner	Kasukabe TS27 Terminus
Hikifune One-way operation	Urban Park Liner From Asakusa	Sengendai TS24 towards Ōmiya or Kashiwa
Hikifune TS04 towards Oshiage	Tobu Skytree Line Express	Nishiarai TS13 towards Tōbu-Dōbutsu-Kōen
Ushida TS08 towards Asakusa	Tobu Skytree Line Section Express	Nishiarai TS13 towards Tōbu-Dōbutsu-Kōen
Hikifune TS04 towards Oshiage	Tobu Skytree Line Semi Express	Nishiarai TS13 towards Tōbu-Dōbutsu-Kōen
Ushida TS08 towards Asakusa	Tobu Skytree Line Section Semi Express	Nishiarai TS13 towards Tōbu-Dōbutsu-Kōen
Ushida TS08 towards Asakusa	Tobu Skytree Line Local	Kosuge TS10 towards Tōbu-Dōbutsu-Kōen
through to Hibiya Line	Tobu Skytree Line Local	Kosuge TS10 towards Tōbu-Dōbutsu-Kōen
Preceding station	Tsukuba Express	Following station
Minami-Senju (TX04) towards Akihabara	Tsukuba Express Rapid	Yashio (TX08) towards Tsukuba
Minami-Senju (TX04) towards Akihabara	Tsukuba Express Commuter-Rapid	Rokuchō (TX07) towards Tsukuba
Minami-Senju (TX04) towards Akihabara	Tsukuba Express Semi-Rapid	Yashio (TX08) towards Tsukuba
Minami-Senju (TX04) towards Akihabara	Tsukuba Express Local	Aoi (TX06) towards Tsukuba
Preceding station	Tokyo Metro	Following station
Minami-senju towards Naka-meguro	Hibiya Line	through to Skytree Line
Ōtemachi towards Hakone-Yumoto, Gotemba or Katase-Enoshima	Romancecar	Terminus
Machiya towards Yoyogi-Uehara	Chiyoda Line	Ayase towards Kita-Ayase
Location
- Location within Special wards of Tokyo Location within Tokyo Bay and Bōsō Peninsula Location within Tokyo Location within Japan

Kita-Senju Station (北千住駅, Kitasenju-eki) (lit. "North Senju station") is a major interchange railway station in the Senju district of Adachi, Tokyo, Japan. Kita-Senju is the third-busiest station on the Tokyo Metro network, after Ikebukuro and Otemachi, and thus the busiest station that is not on the Yamanote Line. It is the tenth-busiest JR East station.

== Lines ==
Kita-Senju Station is served by the following lines.

- JR East Joban Line
- Tobu Skytree Line
- Tokyo Metro Chiyoda Line
- Tokyo Metro Hibiya Line
- Tsukuba Express

== Station layout ==
=== JR East ===
JR East platforms are on ground level.

1-2	Joban Line (Rapid)	for Matsudo, Toride, Tsuchiura, Ishioka, and Mito ■ Narita Line for Narita
2-3	Joban Line (Rapid)	for Nippori, Ueno; Ueno-Tokyo Line for Tokyo and Shinagawa

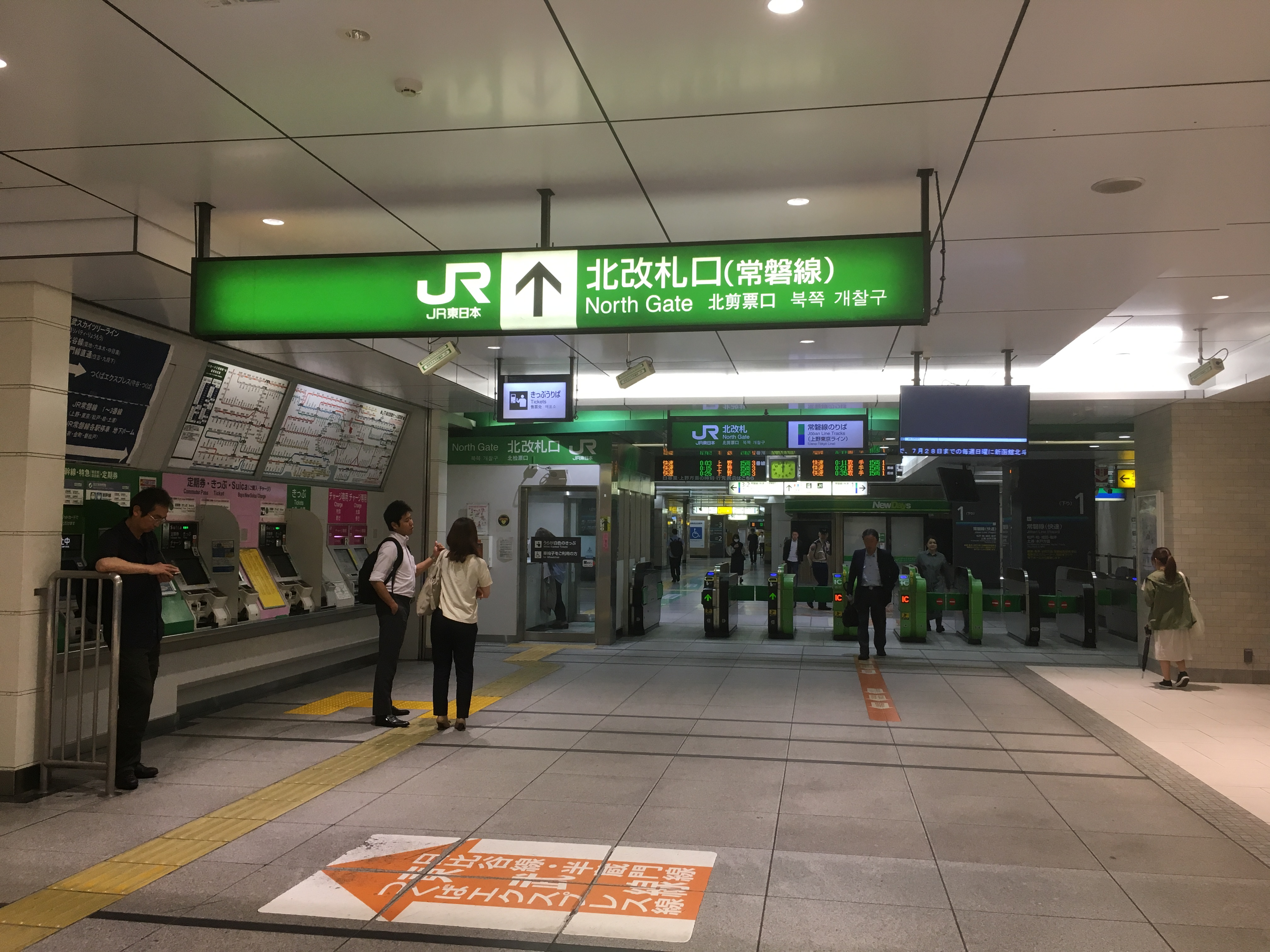
North exit of JR Kita-Senju Station, 2019

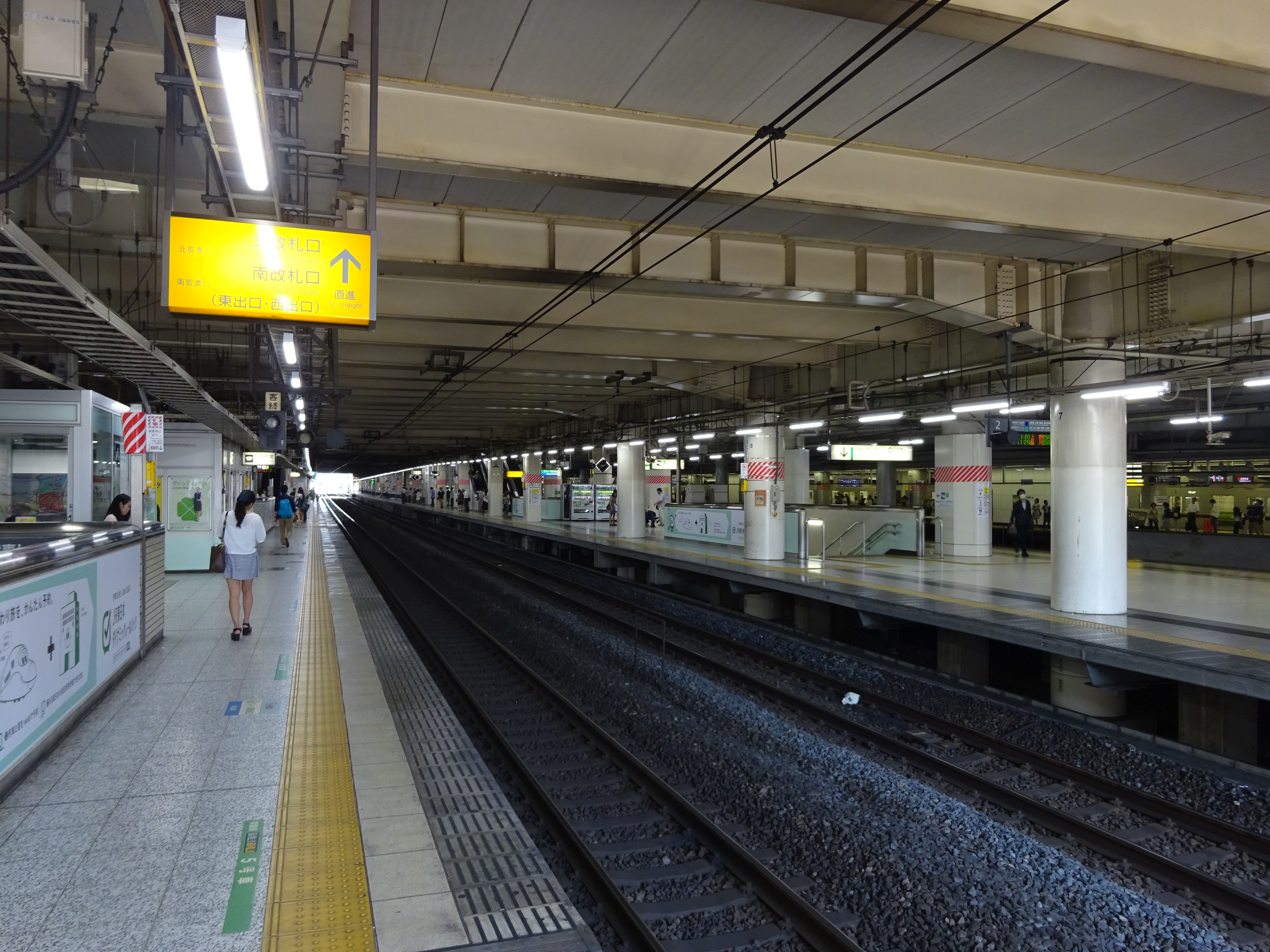
JR East platforms

=== Tokyo Metro Chiyoda Line ===
The Chiyoda Line platforms are underground.

1	Chiyoda Line	for Nishi-nippori, Otemachi, and Yoyogi-uehara; Odakyu Odawara Line for Hon-Atsugi and Isehara □ Romancecar for Hakone-Yumoto and Katase-Enoshima
2	Chiyoda Line	for Ayase, Kita-ayase; Jōban Line (Local) for Matsudo, Abiko and Toride

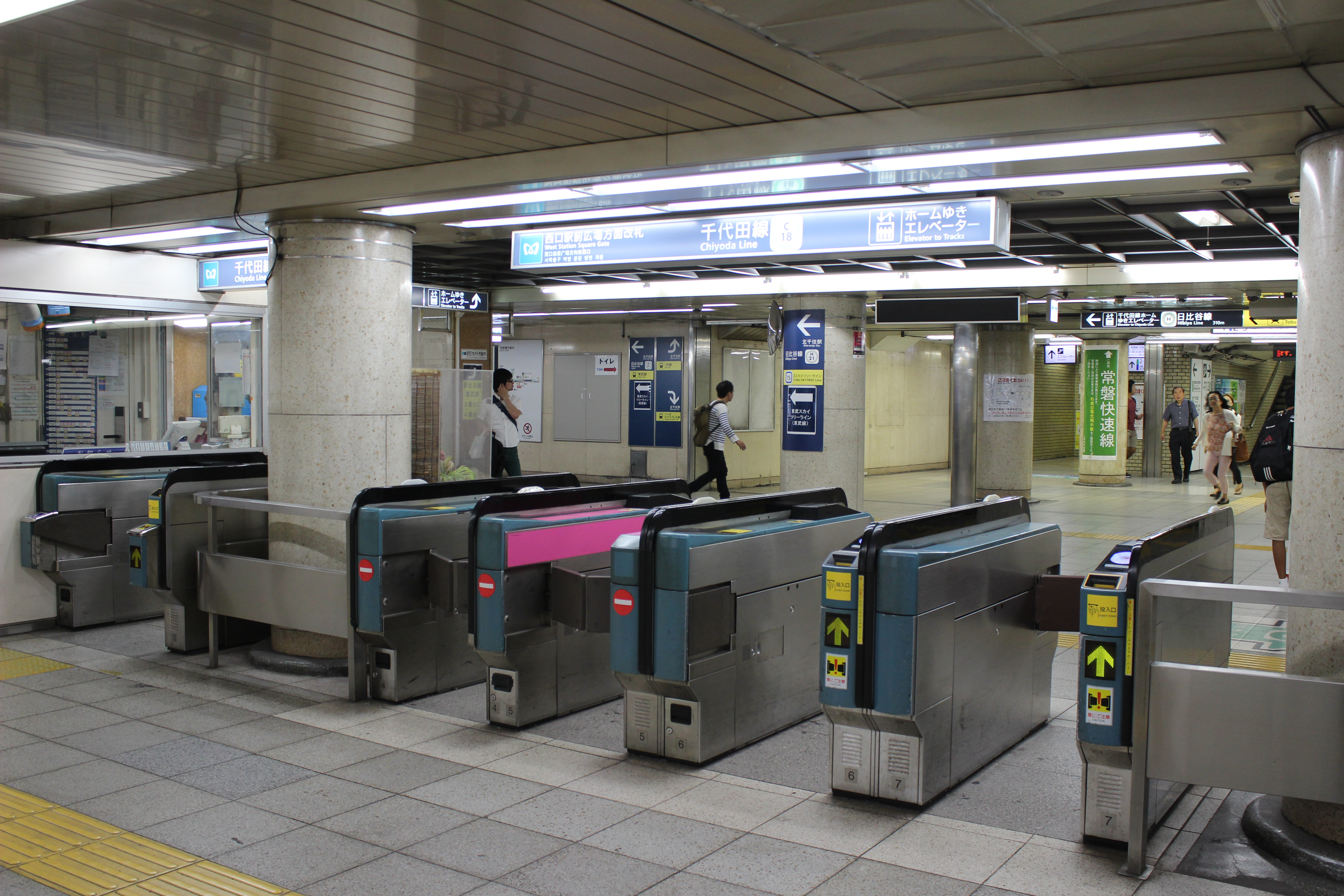
Tokyo Metro Chiyoda Line ticket gates

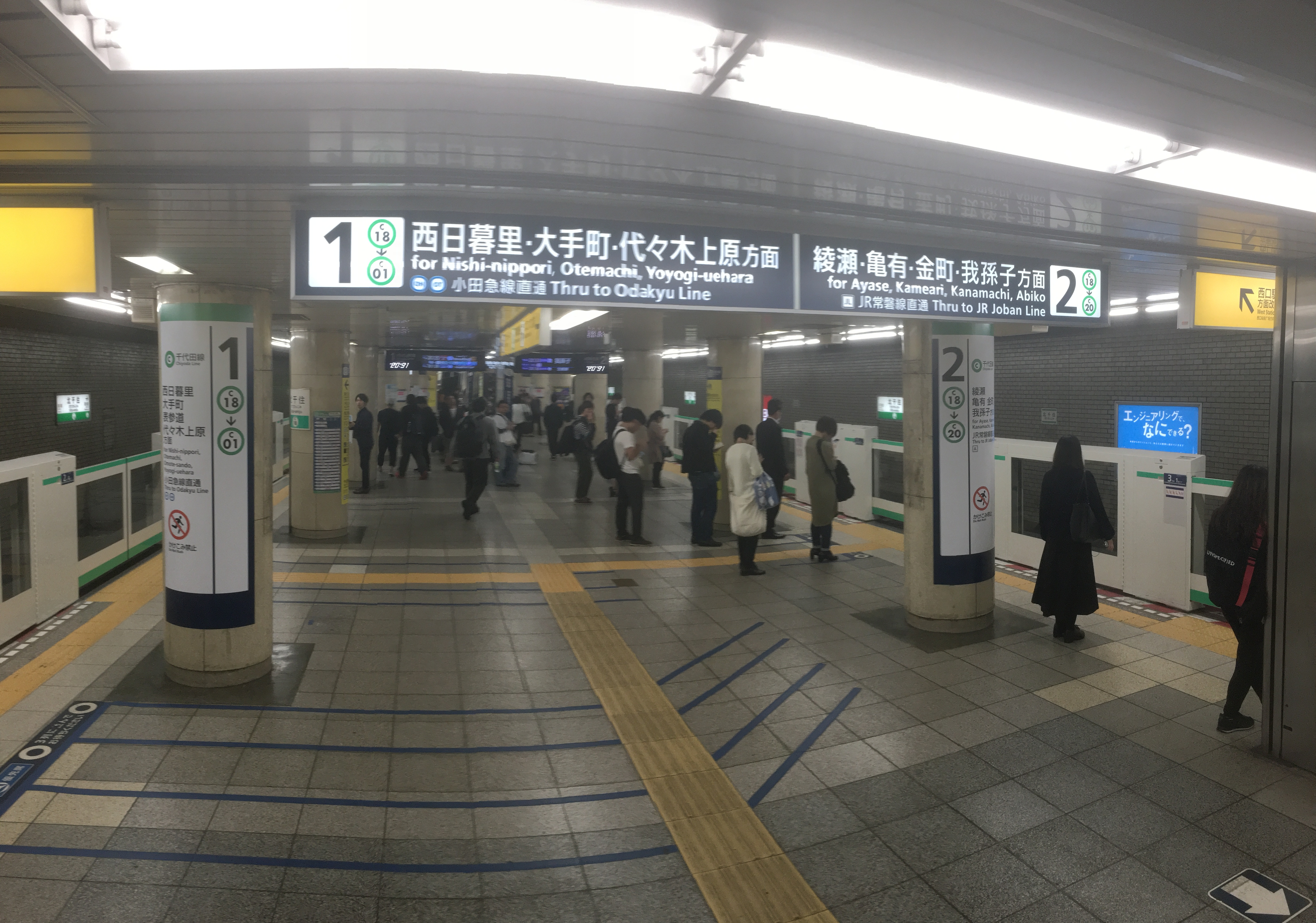
Chiyoda Line platforms with new platform screen doors installed, 2019

=== Tobu Skytree Line and Tokyo Metro Hibiya Line ===
Platforms 1 to 4 are located on ground level (the first floor), and platforms 5 to 7 are elevated (the third floor).

1, 2	Tobu Skytree Line	Limited Express services for Tōbu Nikkō, Kinugawa-Onsen, Akagi, Kuzū, Ashikagashi, Ōmiya, Ōta, Isesaki, and Tōbu Utsunomiya; Other services for Shin-Koshigaya, Tōbu-Dōbutsu-Kōen, Kuki, Tatebayashi and Minami-Kurihashi
3, 4	Tobu Skytree Line	for Oshiage and Asakusa; Hanzōmon Line for Ōtemachi, Shibuya; Den-en-toshi Line for Chūō-Rinkan
5	Tobu Skytree Line (Through trains from Hibiya Line)	for Takenotsuka, Kita-Koshigaya, Kita-Kasukabe, Tōbu-Dōbutsu-Kōen, and Minami-Kurihashi
6, 7	Hibiya Line	for Ueno, Ginza, Roppongi, and Naka-Meguro

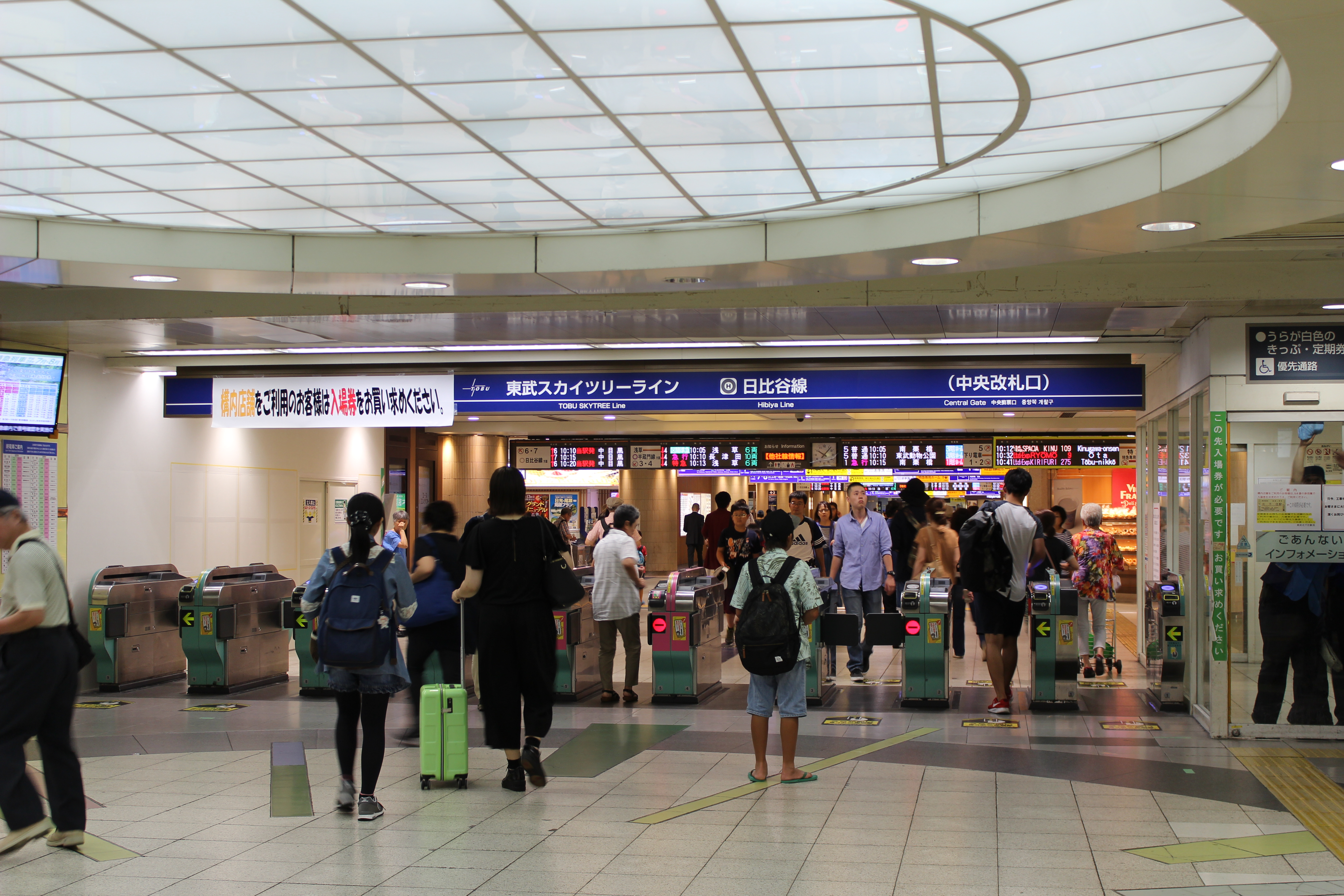
Central ticket gates, 2016

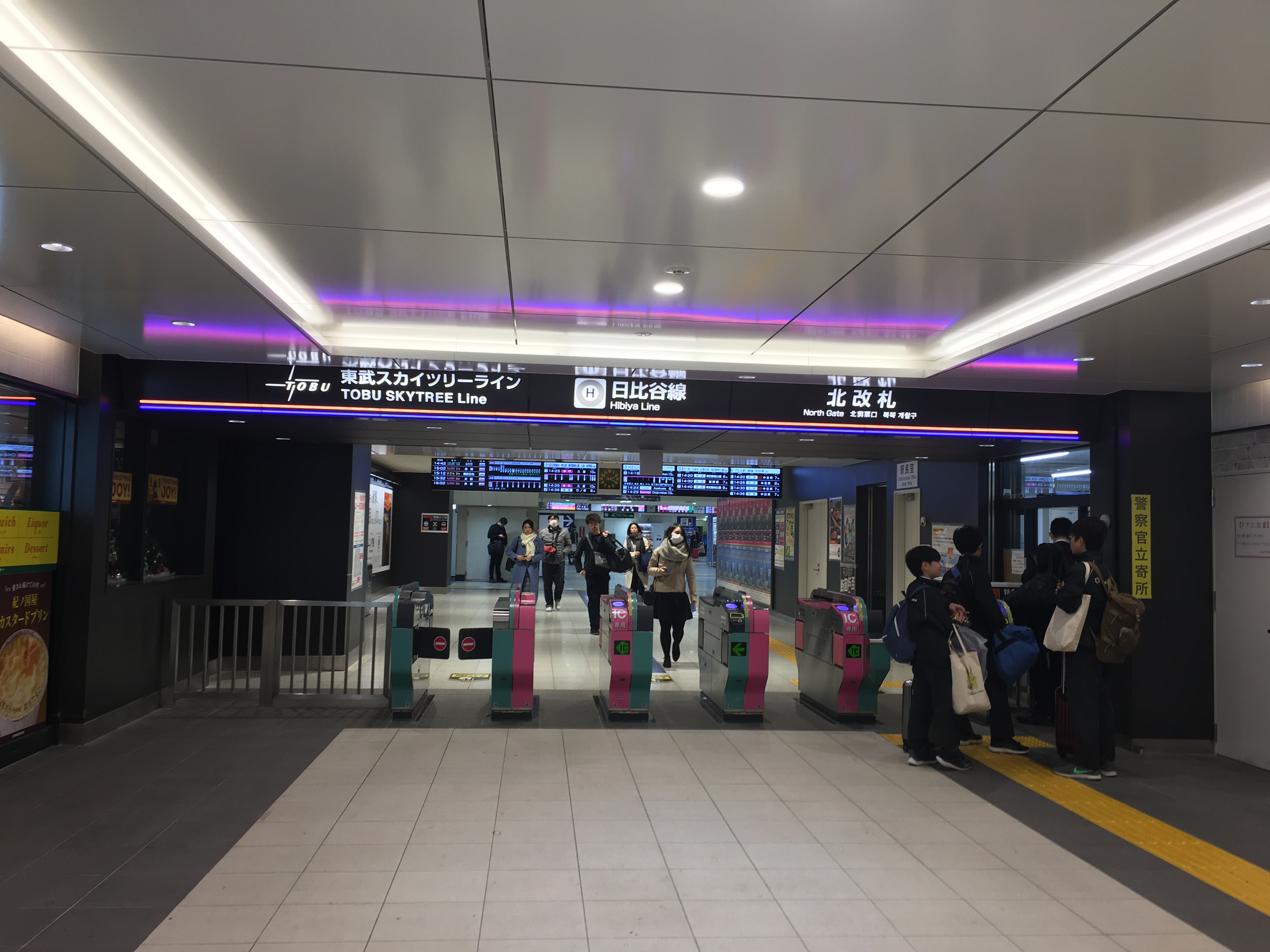
North ticket gates, 2018

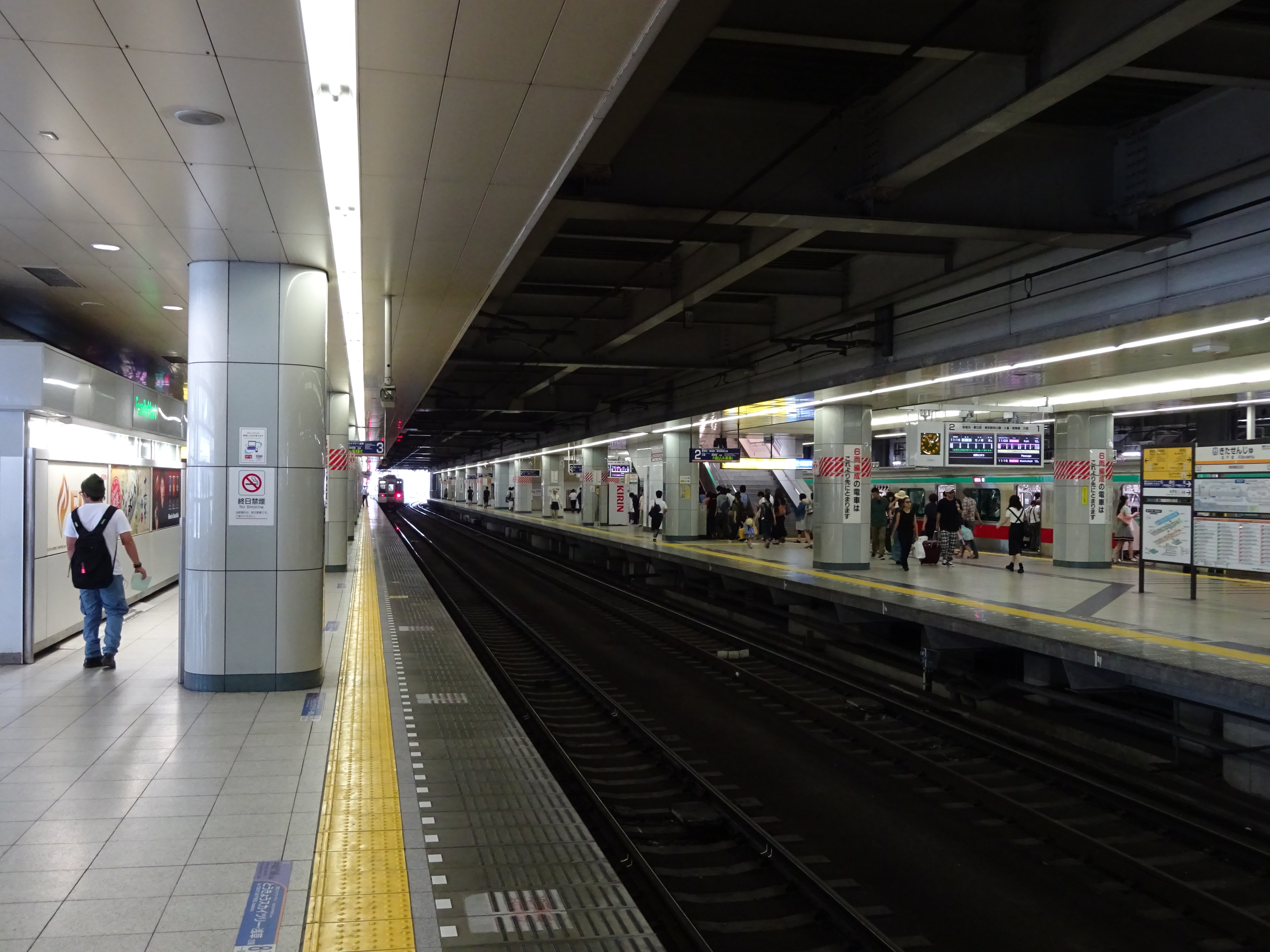
Tobu Skytree Line platforms at the first floor, 2016

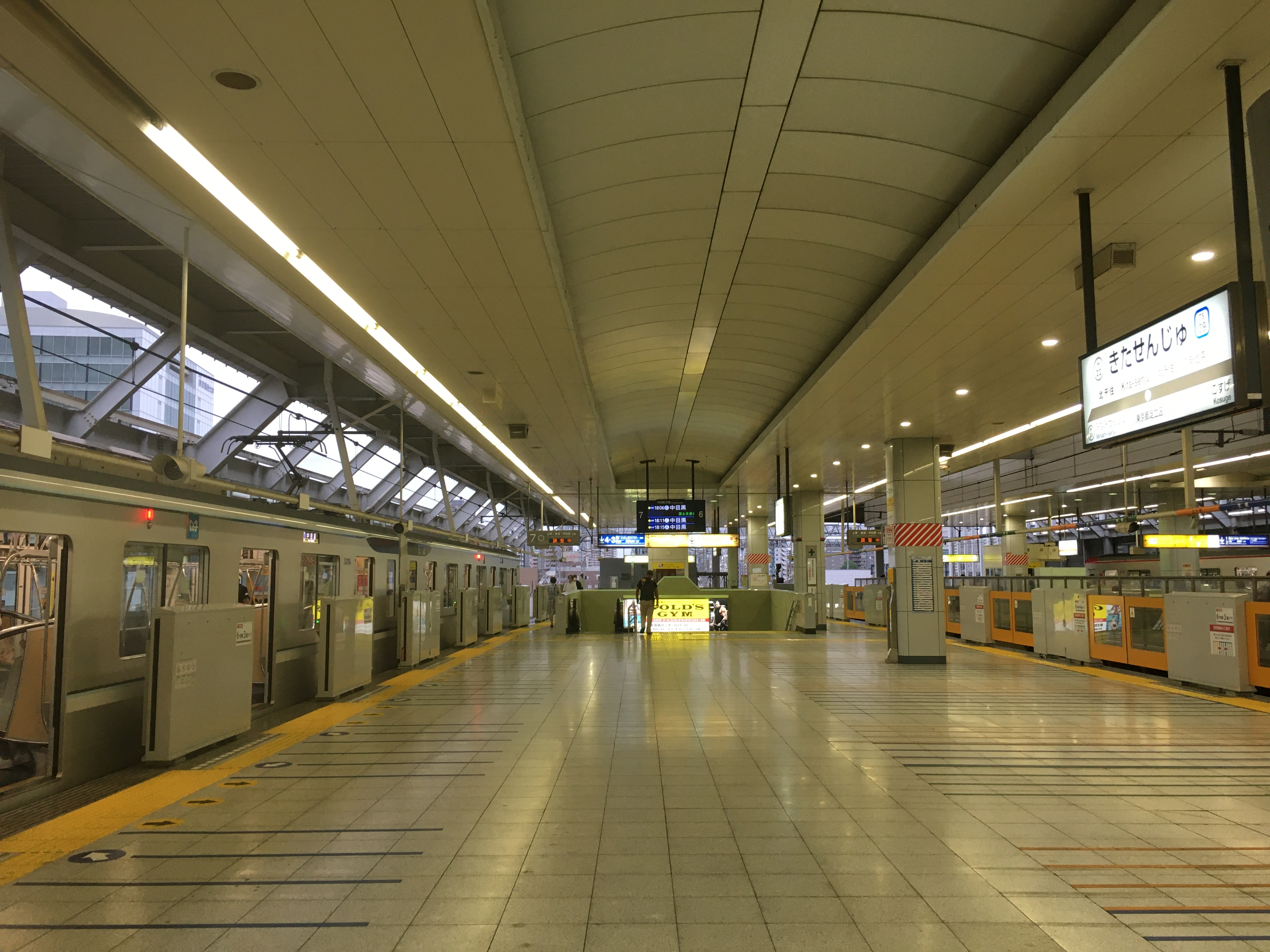
Tokyo Metro Hibiya Line platforms at the third floor, 2021

Track diagram for Hibiya Line and Tobu Line

=== Metropolitan Intercity Railway Company ===
The Tsukuba Express platforms are elevated.

1	Tsukuba Express	for Minami-Nagareyama, Moriya, and Tsukuba
2	Tsukuba Express	for Akihabara

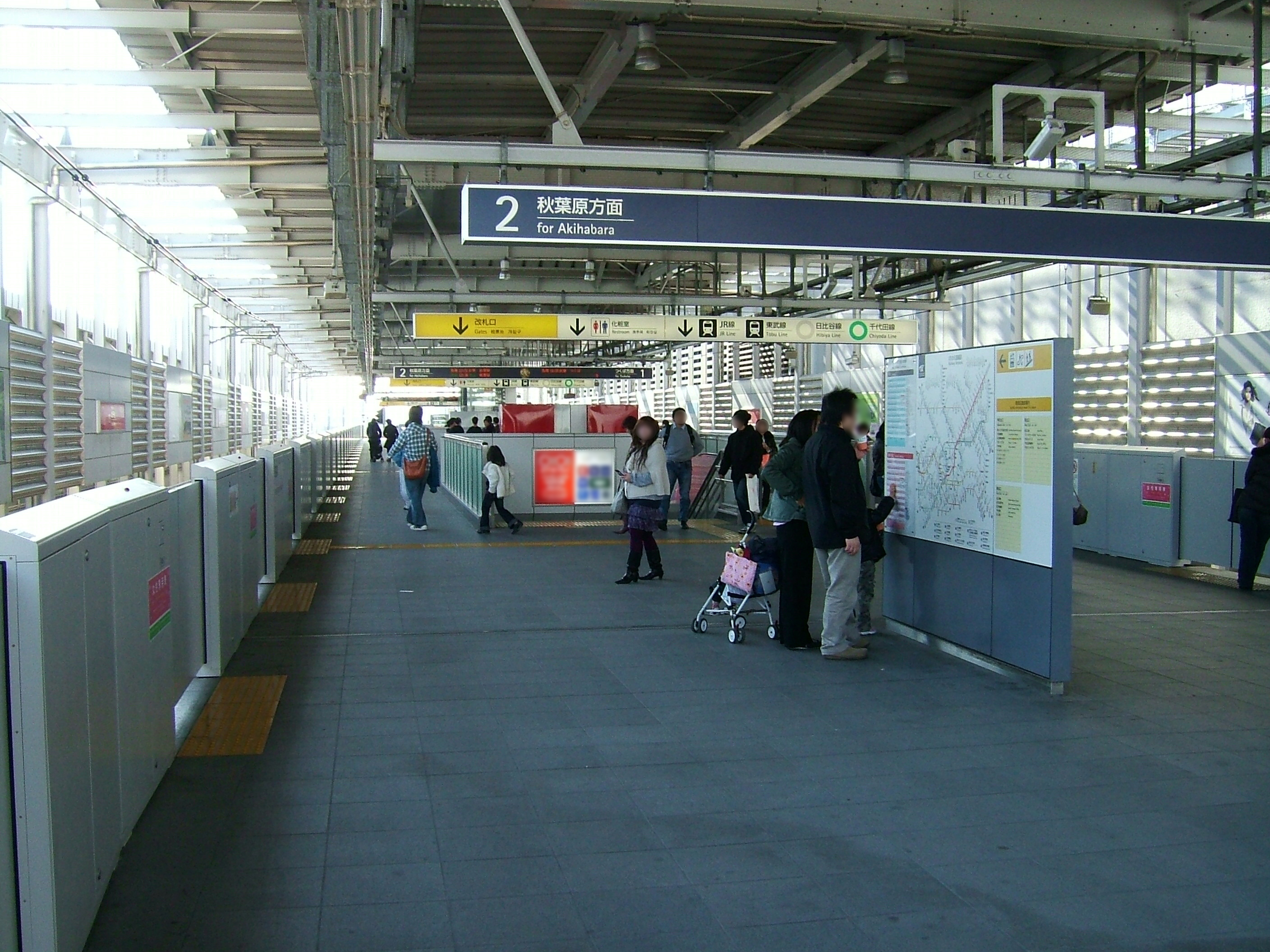
Tsukuba Express platforms

== History ==
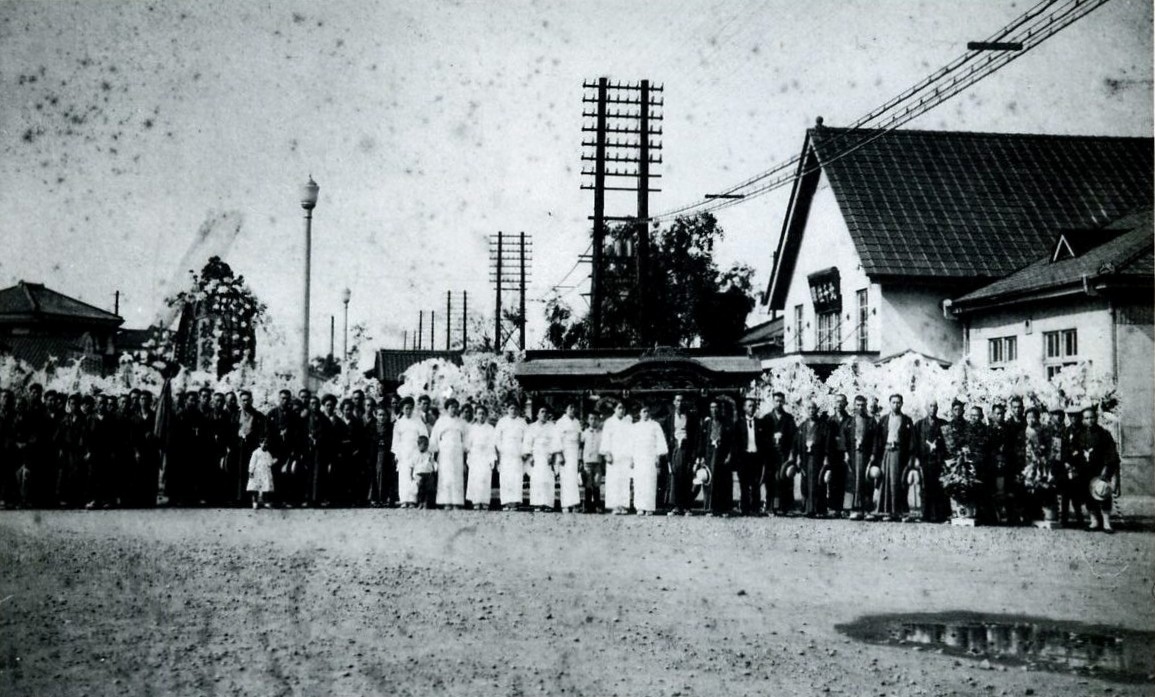
Funeral mourners in front of Kita-Senju Station in 1932

The JR East station opened on 25 December 1896. The Tobu station opened three years later on August 27, with through services with the Hibiya Line commencing in 1962. The Tokyo Metro platforms was opened as the initial northern terminus of the Chiyoda line in 1969 by the Teito Rapid Transit Authority (TRTA). The Tsukuba Express station opened on August 24, 2005.

From 17 March 2012, station numbering was introduced on all Tobu lines, with Kita-Senju Station becoming "TS-09".

The station facilities of the Hibiya and Chiyoda Lines were inherited by Tokyo Metro after the privatization of the Teito Rapid Transit Authority (TRTA) in 2004.

== Passenger statistics ==
In fiscal 2013, the JR East station was used by an average of 203,428 passengers daily (boarding passengers only), making it the tenth-busiest station operated by JR East. In fiscal 2013, the Tokyo Metro Chiyoda station was used by an average of 283,962 passengers per day and the Tokyo Metro Hibiya station was used by an average of 291,466 passengers per day. Note that the latter statistics consider passengers who travel through Kita-Senju station on a through service as users of the station, even if they did not disembark at the station. The Chiyoda Line station is the third-busiest on the Tokyo Metro network which does not offer through services onto other lines. The JR East passenger figures for previous years are as shown below.

Fiscal year	Daily average
2000	183,611
2005	177,104
2010	195,260
2011	194,136
2012	198,624
2013	203,428

== See also ==
- List of railway stations in Japan
