= Tanaka (disambiguation) =

Tanaka is the fourth most common Japanese surname.

Tanaka may also refer to:

- Tanaka, a district of Nagano Prefecture, Japan
  - Tanaka Station, a railway station in Tanaka district, Nagano Prefecture, Japan
- Tanaka (restaurant), a Japanese restaurant in Portland, Oregon, U.S.
- Tanaka Business School, part of Imperial College, London
- Uonuma-Tanaka Station, a railway station in Uonuma, Niigata Prefecture, Japan
- Echigo-Tanaka Station, a railway station in Tsunan, Nakauonuma District, Niigata Prefecture, Japan
- Kashiwa-Tanaka Station, a train station in Kashiwa, Chiba Prefecture, Japan
- Tanaka Power Equipment, makers of small internal combustion engines and associated machinery
- Tanaka Seisakusho (Tanaka Engineering Works), which became Toshiba, a Japanese conglomerate
- Tanaka Memorial, an alleged Japanese war planning document
- Tanaka, a Japanese village merged with Kashiwa, Chiba
- Tanaka Memorial Biological Station on the island of Miyake, Japan
- Tanaka (relief) contours technique

== Given name ==
Tanaka is a Shona word meaning "we are good" which is used as a given name in Zimbabwe:

- Tanaka Chinyahara Zimbabwean professional footballer

== See also ==
- Tanaka formula (disambiguation)
- Tanakan, a trade name for EGb176, a standardized extract of Ginkgo biloba.
- Tanakh, a canon of the Hebrew bible
- Thanaka, a yellowish-white cosmetic paste made from ground bark, also known as Tanaka
