= Okinohara Site =

Archaeological site in Tsunan, Japan

- 沖ノ原遺跡 (Japanese)
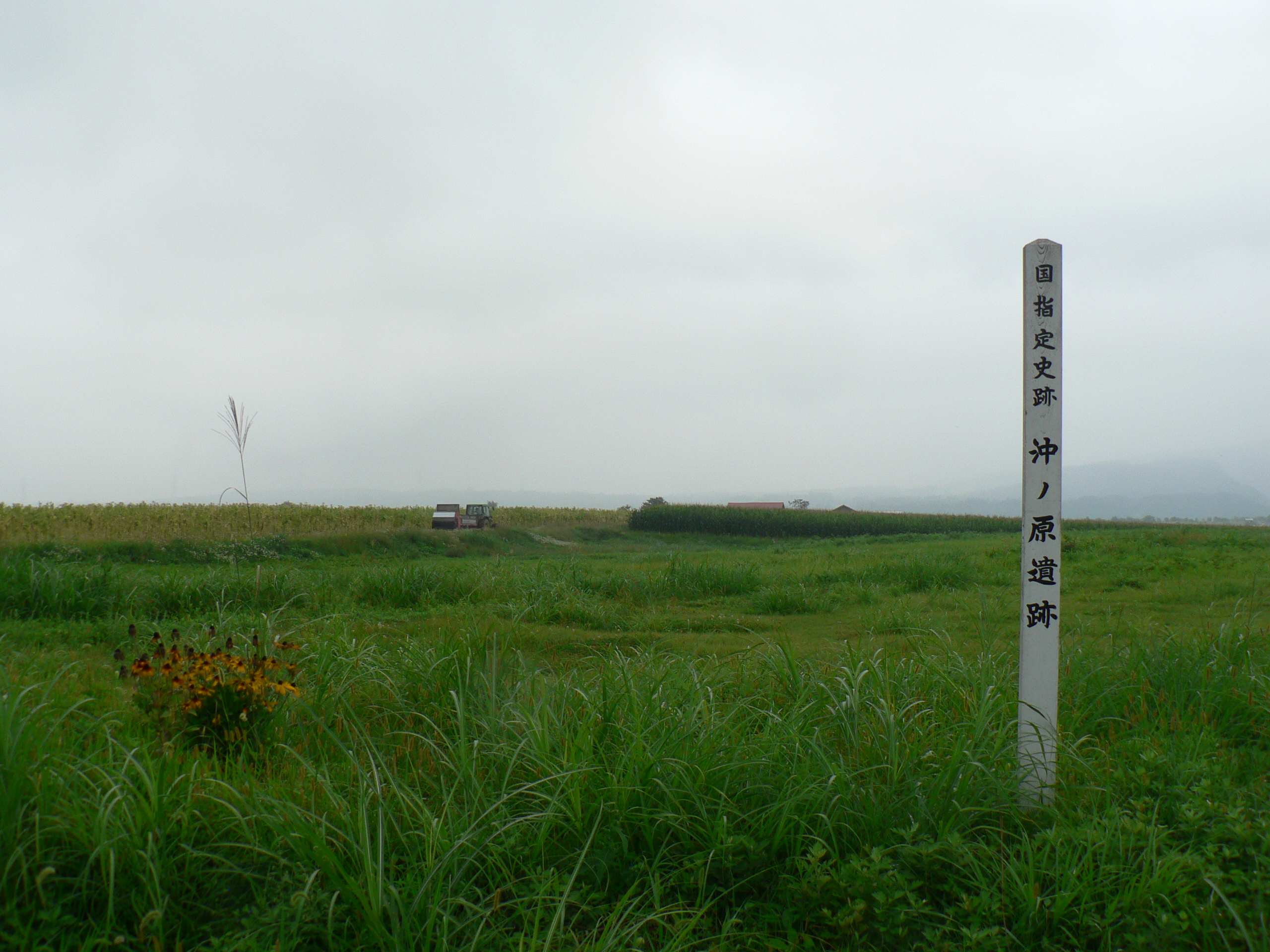
- Okinohara Site

- Okinohara Site Okinohara Site (Japan)
- 36°59′33″N 138°39′06″E
- Type: Settlement
- Periods: Jōmon period
- Location: Tsunan, Niigata, Japan
- Region: Hokuriku region

Site notes
- Public access: Yes (no public facilities)

The Okinohara Site (沖ノ原遺跡, Okinohara Iseki) is an archaeological site containing the remnants of a middle Jōmon period settlement located in the Akazawa neighborhood of the town of Tsunan, Niigata in the Hokuriku region of Japan. It was designated a National Historic Site of Japan in 1978.

== Overview ==
The Okinohara Site is located on a [river terrace of the Shinano River and contains the ruins of a large moated village from the middle Jōmon period (approximately 5300 to 4000 years ago). The area was developed as a plantation for paulownia trees for many years, and was converted to farmland after World War II. The ruins were first discovered in conjunction with a field improvement project. The first archaeological excavation of the site was conducted from 1970-1973, revealing the foundations for 49 circular pit dwellings and three large rectangular-sided structures with sides measuring 10 meters, and one stone-paved structure. These structures were arranged around a roughly circular plaza 120 meters in diameter. From the distribution of the structures, it has been estimated that the settlement had perhaps 200 houses in total, with chestnut wood used in their construction. Larger structures were not residences, but were used for some communal or ceremonial purpose.

In addition, over 1686 examples of "flame style" Jōmon pottery, a motif common to many areas of central Honshu, were discovered. In addition, a style of pottery unique to this location was also discovered. Called the "Okinohara type pottery", it has a small bottom and is shaped like a bucket, with the entire pottery tilted in one direction. Decorations are concentrated on the rim and the upper half of the body. It is uncertain what this pottery was used for. Other artifacts included stone tools and many chestnuts, walnuts and acorns. In addition, small lumps of a carbonized organic material dubbed "Jōmon cookies" were discovered. This is believed to be the remains of some form of preserved bread. The quantity of chestnuts found lends evidence to a theory that the Jōmon people were not only hunter-gatherers, but also actively cultivated chestnut trees.

The site was backfilled after excavation and is now an empty field. In 1995, some 1686 items of the excavated artifacts were collectively designated as a Tangible Cultural Property of Niigata Prefecture, and are currently stored and exhibited at the Tsunan Town History and Folklore Museum. The site is located approximately 15 minutes by car from Tsunan Station on the JR East Iiyama Line.

== See also ==
- List of Historic Sites of Japan (Niigata)
