= Tanaka (given name) =

Given name

Tanaka is a unisex given name of Shona origin, meaning "our lives have been made beautiful" as well as "we are in a state of goodness." Shona names are often symbolic and usually have sentimental significance. Most shona names praise God.

The name does not have spelling variations as Shona is a phonetic language and any changes can result in the alteration of the name and definition entirely.

Similar names include Takanaka, Makanaka, Manaka, Wanaka.

== People with the name Tanaka ==
- Tanaka Chinyahara Zimbabwean professional footballer
- Tanaka Chivanga a Zimbabwean cricketer
- Tanaka Chikati a traditional music from Zimbabwe
- Tanaka Zvaita December 28 reserve for Zimbabwe's squad for the 2022 ICC Under-19 Cricket World Cup squads
- Tanaka Chidora a Zimbabwean poet, literary critic and academic
- Tanaka Dumbura a Zimbabwean model
- Tanaka Masamuke a Zimbabwean online entrepreneur
- Tanaka Siziba Zimbabwean musical artist

== See also ==
- Tanaka (surname)
- Tanaka (disambiguation)
