= Aleksandar Đokić =

Serbian architect

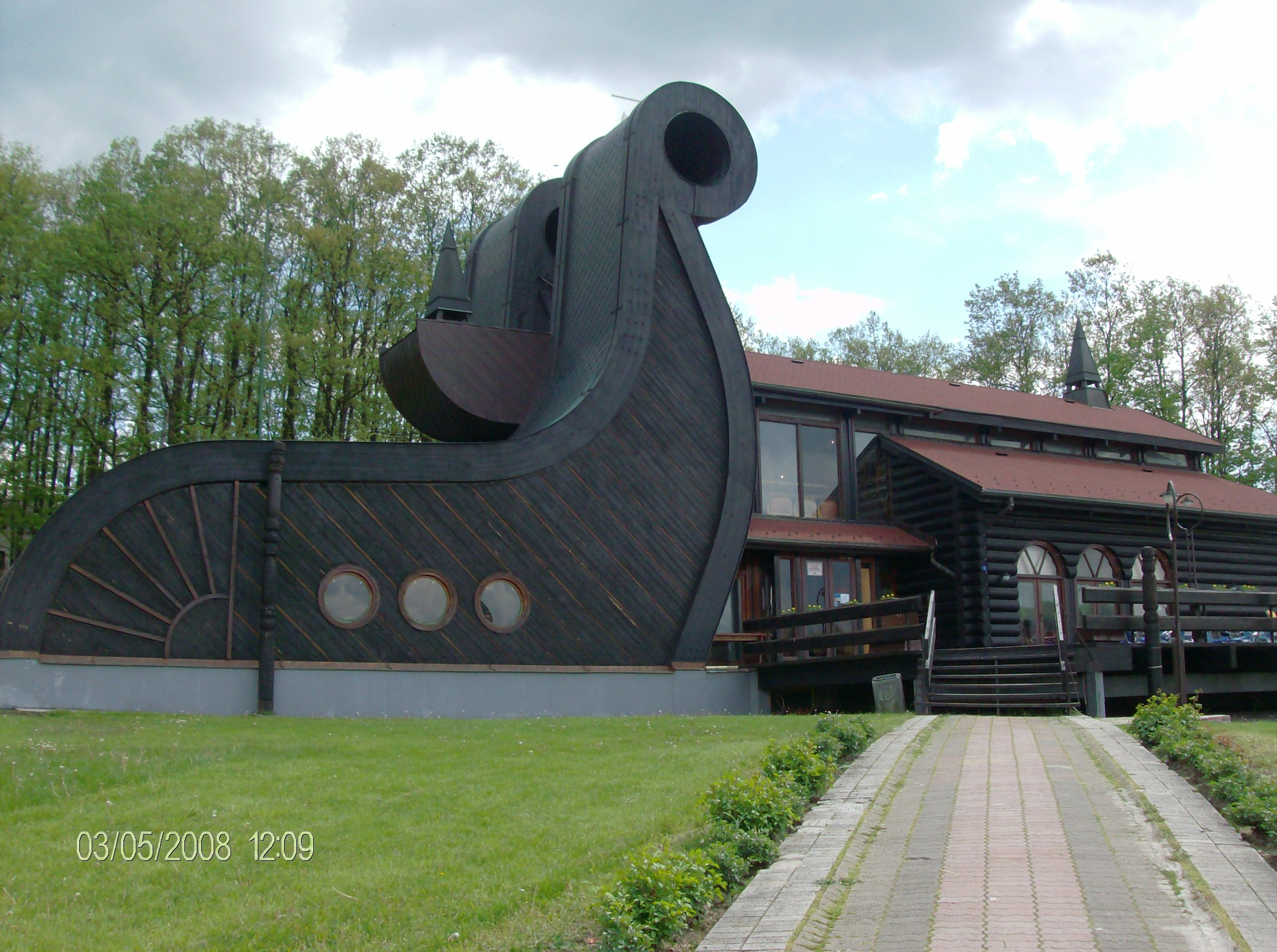
House of Serbo-Norwegian Friendship designed by Aleksandar Đokić

Aleksandar Đokić (Serbian Cyrillic: Александар Ђокић; 28 December 1936 – 22 May 2002) was a Serbian architect who gained fame for his original designs created in the Brutalist and postmodernist styles. He graduated from the University of Belgrade Faculty of Architecture.

A native of the Serbian capital, Belgrade, Aleksandar Đokić has designed numerous structures and edifices considered to be straddling the boundary between post-Modern and neo-Romantic architecture. His most-publicized creation, the Center of Norwegian-Yugoslav Friendship in the Rudnik-Vujan mountain town of Gornji Milanovac, has been compared to the works of his younger Japanese contemporary, Makoto Sei Watanabe, who incorporates tigers and dragons into his art, as Đokić has included Serbian log cabins and Norsemen boats into his designs for the Center.

Aleksandar Đokić died in Belgrade at the age of 65.
