= Kashiwa-Tanaka Station =

Railway station in Kashiwa, Chiba Prefecture, Japan

Kashiwa-Tanaka Station 柏たなか駅
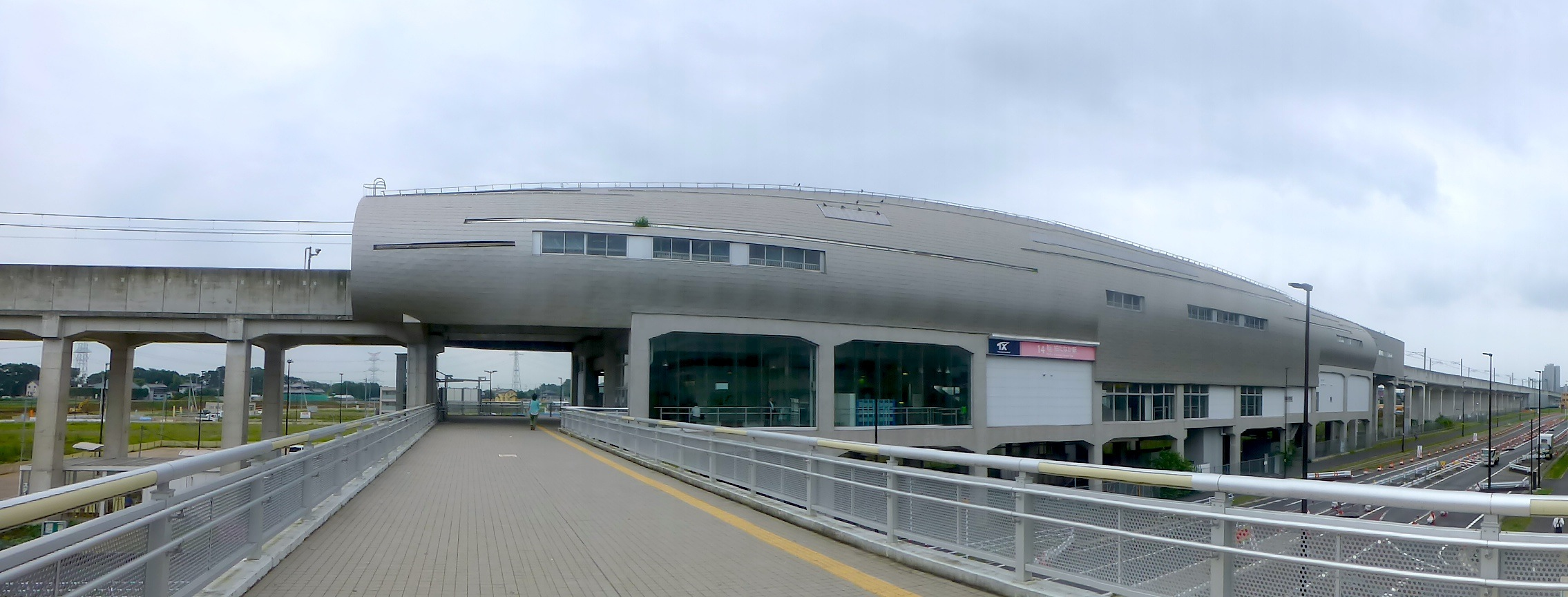
- Station building, 2016

General information
- Location: 274-1 Omatsu Koaota, Kashiwa-shi, Chiba-ken 277-0803; Japan
- Coordinates: 35°54′39.74″N 139°57′27.06″E
- Operator: Metropolitan Intercity Railway Company
- Line: Tsukuba Express
- Distance: 32.0 km from Akihabara
- Platforms: 2 (2 side platforms)

Construction
- Structure type: Elevated
- Accessible: Yes

Other information
- Status: Staffed
- Station code: TX14
- Website: Official website

History
- Opened: 24 August 2005

Passengers
- FY2019: 6,843 daily

Services
Preceding station	Tsukuba Express	Following station
Kashiwanoha-campus (TX13) towards Akihabara	Tsukuba Express Local	Moriya (TX15) towards Tsukuba
Location
- Location within Chiba Prefecture Location within Japan

Kashiwa-Tanaka Station (柏たなか駅, Kashiwa-Tanaka-eki) is a passenger railway station in the city of Kashiwa, Chiba Prefecture, Japan. Its station number is TX14.

== Line ==
Kashiwa-Tanaka Station is served by the Metropolitan Intercity Railway Company's Tsukuba Express line, which operates between Akihabara Station in Tokyo and Tsukuba Station. It is located 32.0 kilometers from the terminus of the line at Akihabara.

== Station layout ==
The station consists of two opposed elevated side platforms with the station building located underneath. The station building was designed by architect Makoto Sei Watanabe.

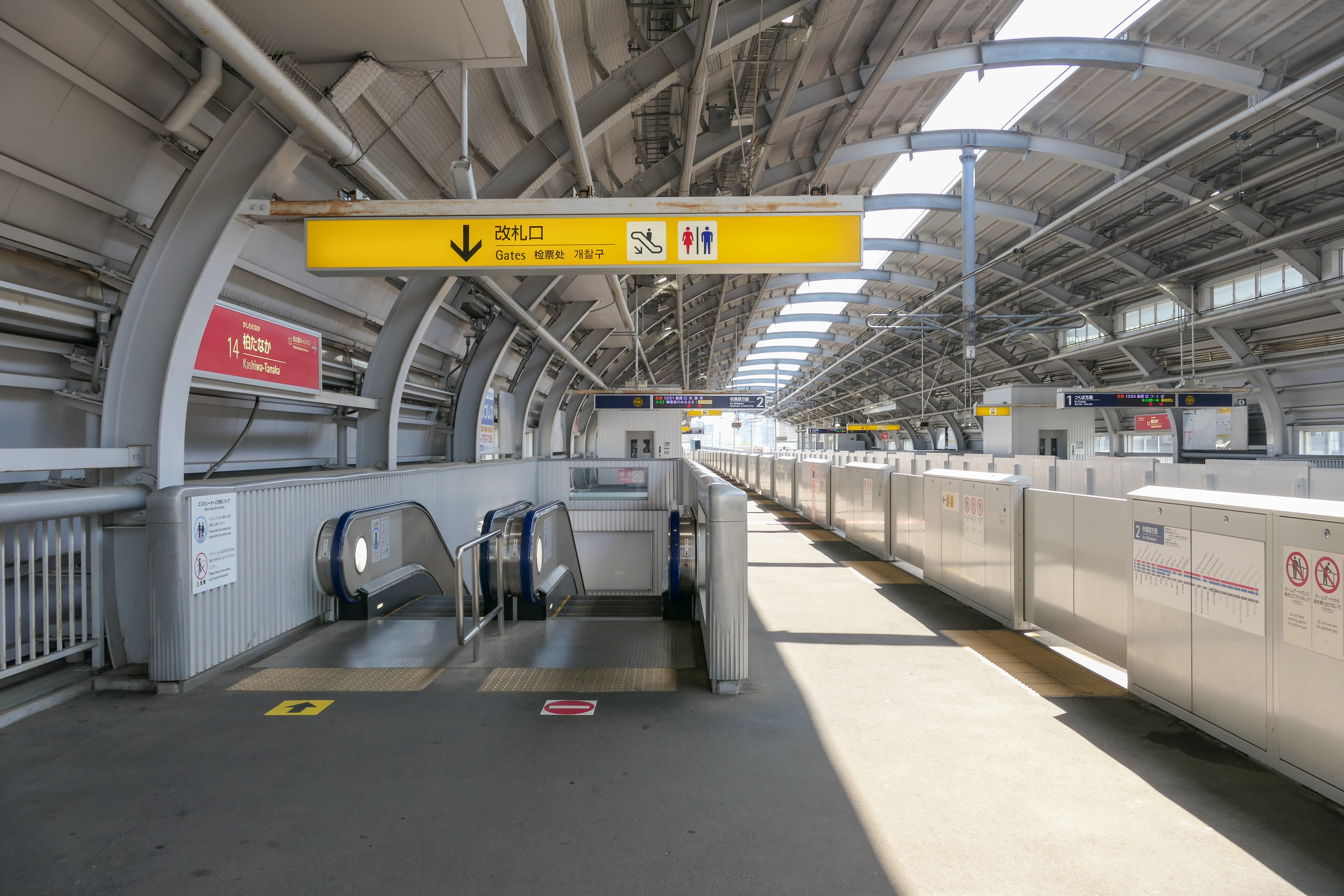
Platform 2, May 2023

=== Platforms ===
1	■ Tsukuba Express	for Tsukuba
2	■ Tsukuba Express	for Akihabara

== History ==
The station opened on 24 August 2005, coinciding with the opening of the Tsukuba Express line.

== Passenger statistics ==
In fiscal 2019, the station was used by an average of 6,843 passengers daily (boarding passengers only).

== Surrounding area ==
- Tone River
- Kashiwa-Tanaka Post Office
- Kashiwa City Tanaka Middle School

== See also ==
- List of railway stations in Japan
