= Kashiwanoha-campus Station =

Railway station in Kashiwa, Chiba Prefecture, Japan

Kashiwanoha-campus Station 柏の葉キャンパス駅
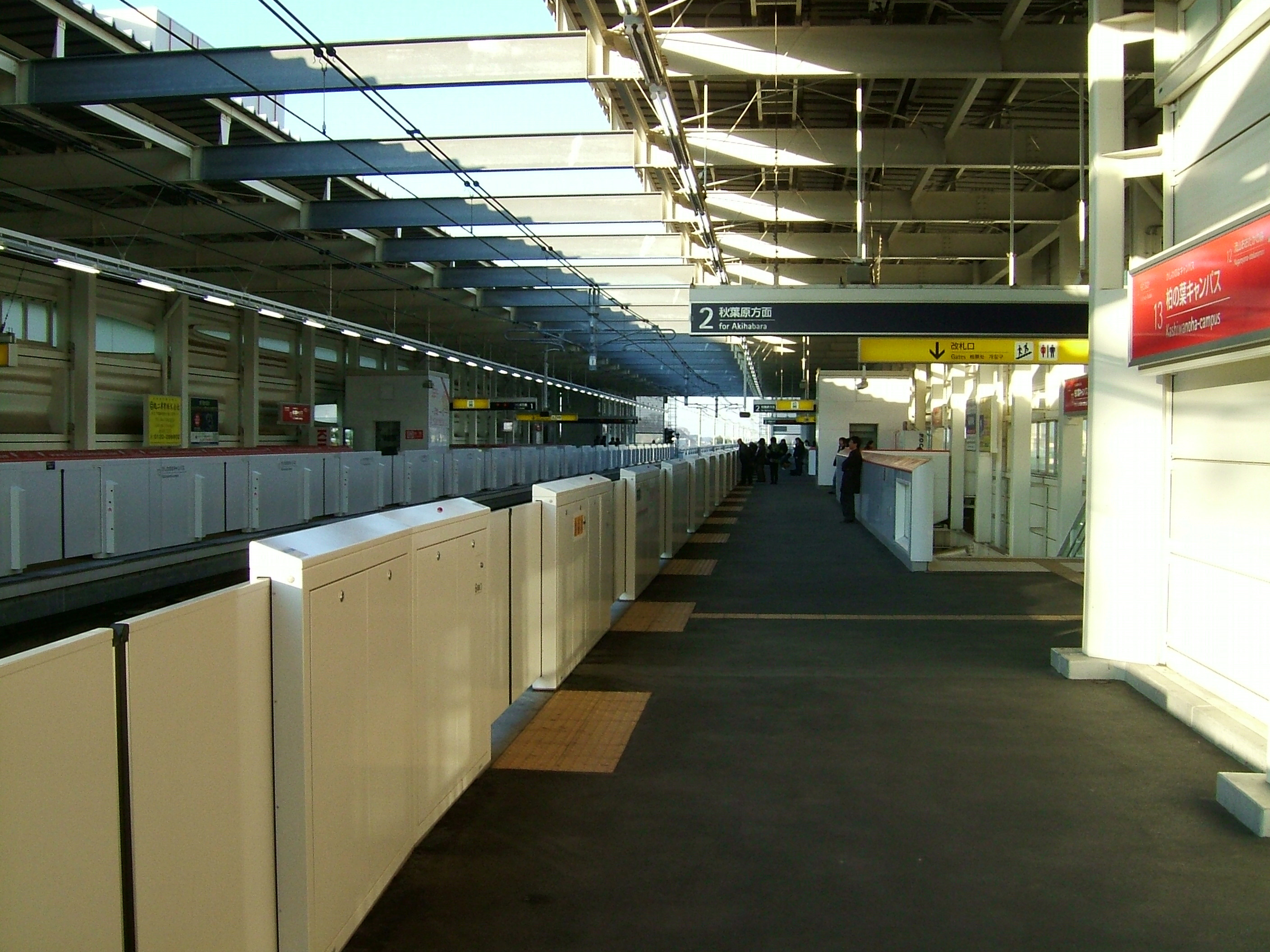
- Platform level of Kashiwanoha-campus Station

General information
- Location: 174 Wakashiba, Kashiwa-shi, Chiba-ken 277-0871; Japan
- Coordinates: 35°53′35.91″N 139°57′9.14″E
- Operator: Metropolitan Intercity Railway Company
- Line: Tsukuba Express
- Distance: 30.0 km from Akihabara
- Platforms: 2 (2 side platforms)

Construction
- Structure type: Elevated
- Accessible: Yes

Other information
- Status: Staffed
- Station code: TX13
- Website: Official website

History
- Opened: 24 August 2005

Passengers
- FY2019: 18,015 daily

Services
Preceding station	Tsukuba Express	Following station
Nagareyama-Ōtakanomori (TX12) towards Akihabara	Tsukuba Express Commuter-Rapid Semi-Rapid	Moriya (TX15) towards Tsukuba
Nagareyama-Ōtakanomori (TX12) towards Akihabara	Tsukuba Express Local	Kashiwa-Tanaka (TX14) towards Tsukuba
Location
- Location within Chiba Prefecture Location within Japan

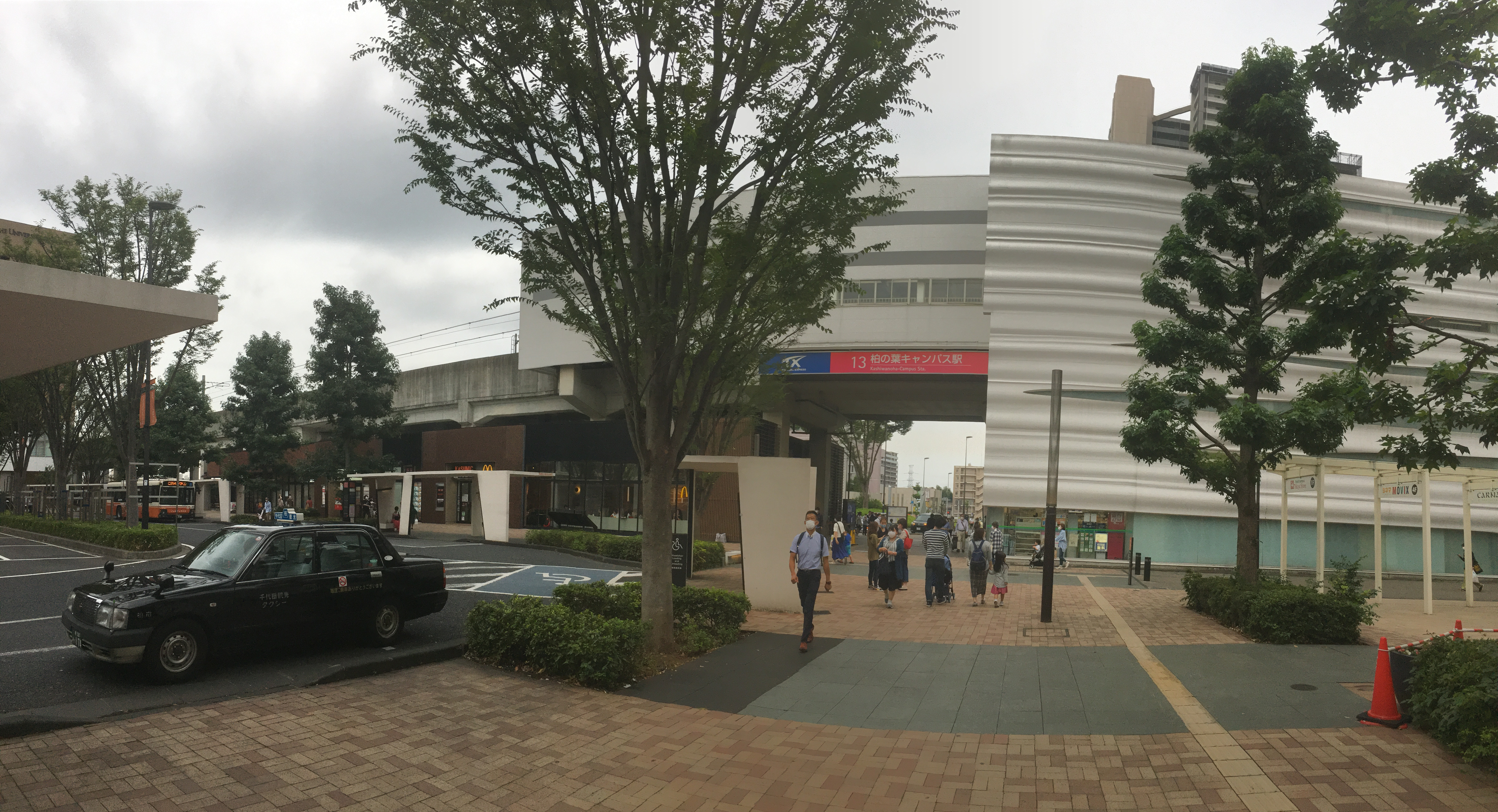
Front of the station, 2020

Kashiwanoha-campus Station (柏の葉キャンパス駅, Kashiwanoha-kyanpasu-eki) is a passenger railway station in the city of Kashiwa, Chiba Prefecture, Japan. Its station number is TX13.

== Line ==
Kashiwanoha-campus Station is served by the Metropolitan Intercity Railway Company's Tsukuba Express line, which operates between Akihabara Station in Tokyo and Tsukuba Station. It is located 30.0 kilometers from the terminus of the line at Akihabara.

== Station layout ==
The station consists of two opposed elevated side platforms, with the station building located underneath. The station building was designed by architect Makoto Sei Watanabe.

=== Platforms ===
1	■ Tsukuba Express	for Tsukuba
2	■ Tsukuba Express	for Akihabara

== History ==
The station opened on 24 August 2005, coinciding with the opening of the Tsukuba Express line.

== Passenger statistics ==
In fiscal 2019, the station was used by an average of 18,015 passengers daily (boarding passengers only).

== Surrounding area ==
The station is surrounded by large-scale new town housing developments.

The University of Tokyo Kashiwa Campus is a short distance away by Tobu Bus.

== See also ==
- List of railway stations in Japan
