= Shibaura Seisakusho =

New name given to the company Tanaka Seisakusho

Shibaura Seisakusho (芝浦製作所, Shibaura Engineering Works) was the new name given to the company Tanaka Seisakusho (Tanaka Engineering Works), after it was declared insolvent in 1893 and taken over by Mitsui Bank.

In 1910 it formed a tie-up with General Electric (GE) which in exchange for technology acquired about a quarter of the shares of Shibaura. With this investment GE now had a stake in both Tokyo Denki and Shibaura Seisakusho - two companies that had a complementary line of products in light as well as heavy electrical equipment. Both companies were merged in 1939 to create Tokyo Shibaura Denki (Tokyo Shibaura Electric Company, now Toshiba). The relation with GE continued until the beginning of the war and, after the war, resumed in 1953 with GE's 24 percent shareholding. This percentage has however decreased substantially since then.
