= Tanaka Seisakusho =

First company established by Tanaka Hisashige

Tanaka Seisakusho (田中製作所, Tanaka Engineering Works) was the first company established by Tanaka Hisashige, one of the most original and productive inventor-engineers during the Tokugawa / Edo period.

== Overview ==
Established in July 1875, it was the first Japanese company to manufacture telegraph equipment. It also manufactured switches, and miscellaneous electrical and communications equipment.

The company was inherited by Tanaka's adopted son, and later became half of the present Toshiba company. Several people who worked at Tanaka Seisakusho or who received Tanaka's guidance at a Kubusho (Ministry of Industries) factory later became pioneers themselves. These included Miyoshi Shōichi who helped Fujioka make the first power generator in Japan and to establish a company, Hakunetsusha to make bulbs; Oki Kibatarō, the founder of the present Oki Denki (Oki Electric Industry); and Ishiguro Keizaburō, a co-founder of the present Anritsu.

After the demise of the founder in 1881 Tanaka Seisakusho became partly owned by General Electric and expanded into the production of torpedoes and mines at the request of the Imperial Japanese Navy, to become on the largest manufacturing companies of the time. However, as the Navy started to use competitive bids and then build its own works, the demand decreased substantially and the company started to lose money. The main creditor to the company, Mitsui Bank, took over the insolvent company in 1893 and renamed it Shibaura Seisakusho (Shibaura Engineering Works).
