= Tsunan =

Tsunan 津南町
- Town
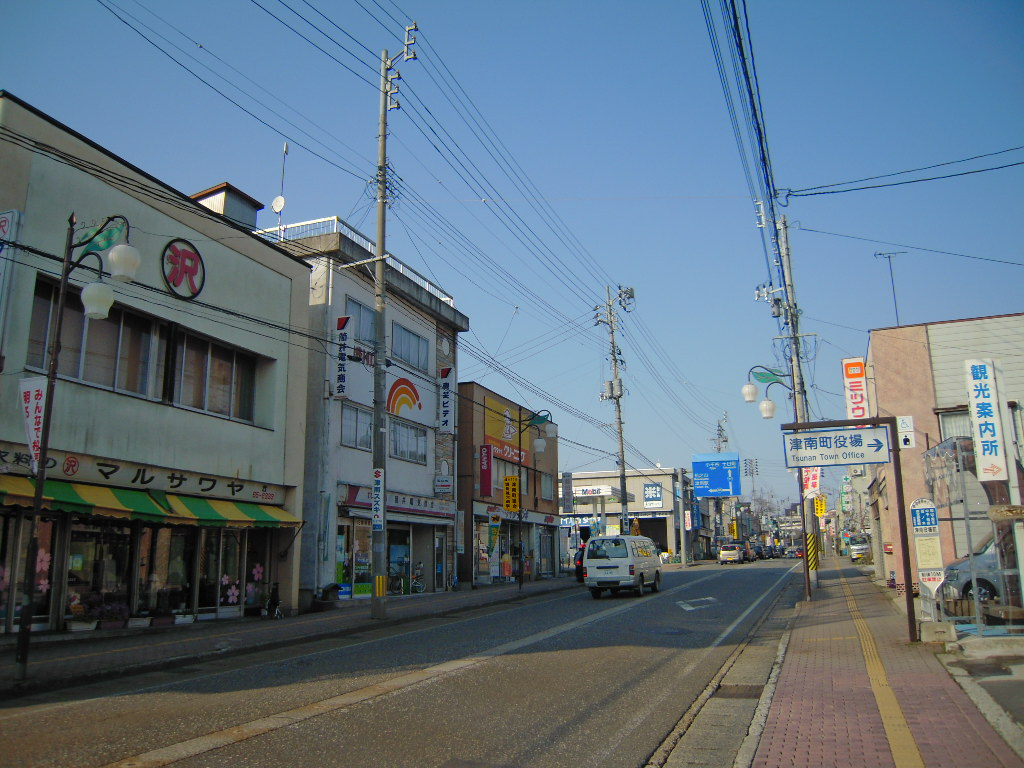
- Central Tsunan

- Flag Seal

- Location of Tsunan in Niigata

- Coordinates: 37°0′51.4″N 138°39′9.1″E
- Country: Japan
- Region: Chūbu (Kōshin'etsu) (Hokuriku)
- Prefecture: Niigata
- District: Nakauonuma

Area
  - Total: 170.21 km^{2} (65.72 sq mi)

Population (March 31, 2020)
  - Total: 9,349
  - Density: 54.93/km^{2} (142.3/sq mi)
- Time zone: UTC+9 (Japan Standard Time)
- Phone number: 025-765-3111
- Address: 585 Shimofunato, Tsunan-machi, Nakauonuma-gun, Niigata-ken 949-8201
- Climate: Cfa
- Website: Official website
- Symbols
- Bird: Japanese bush-warbler
- Flower: Chrysanthemum morifolium
- Tree: Paulownia tomentosa

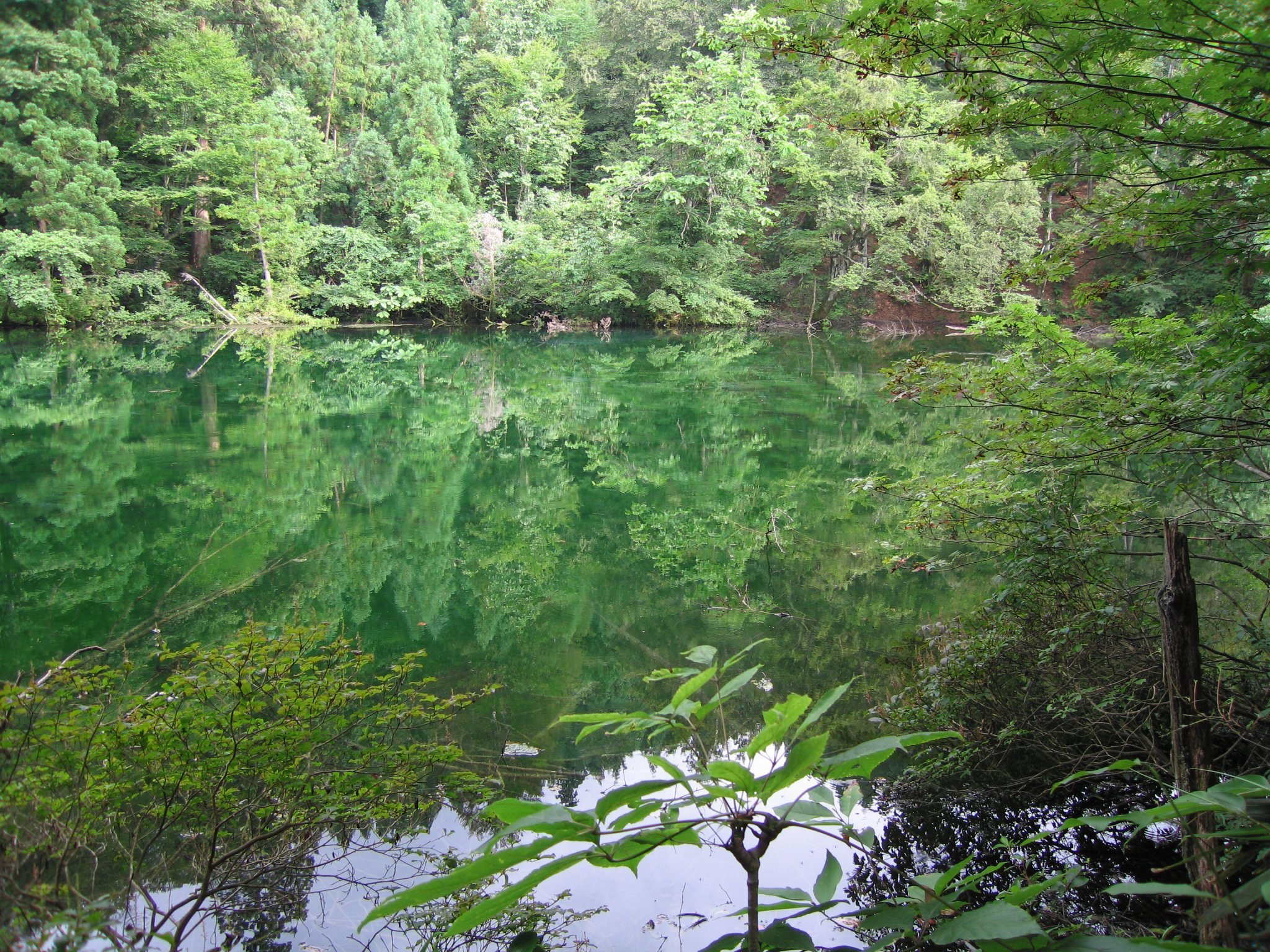
Ryu-ga-Kubo springs

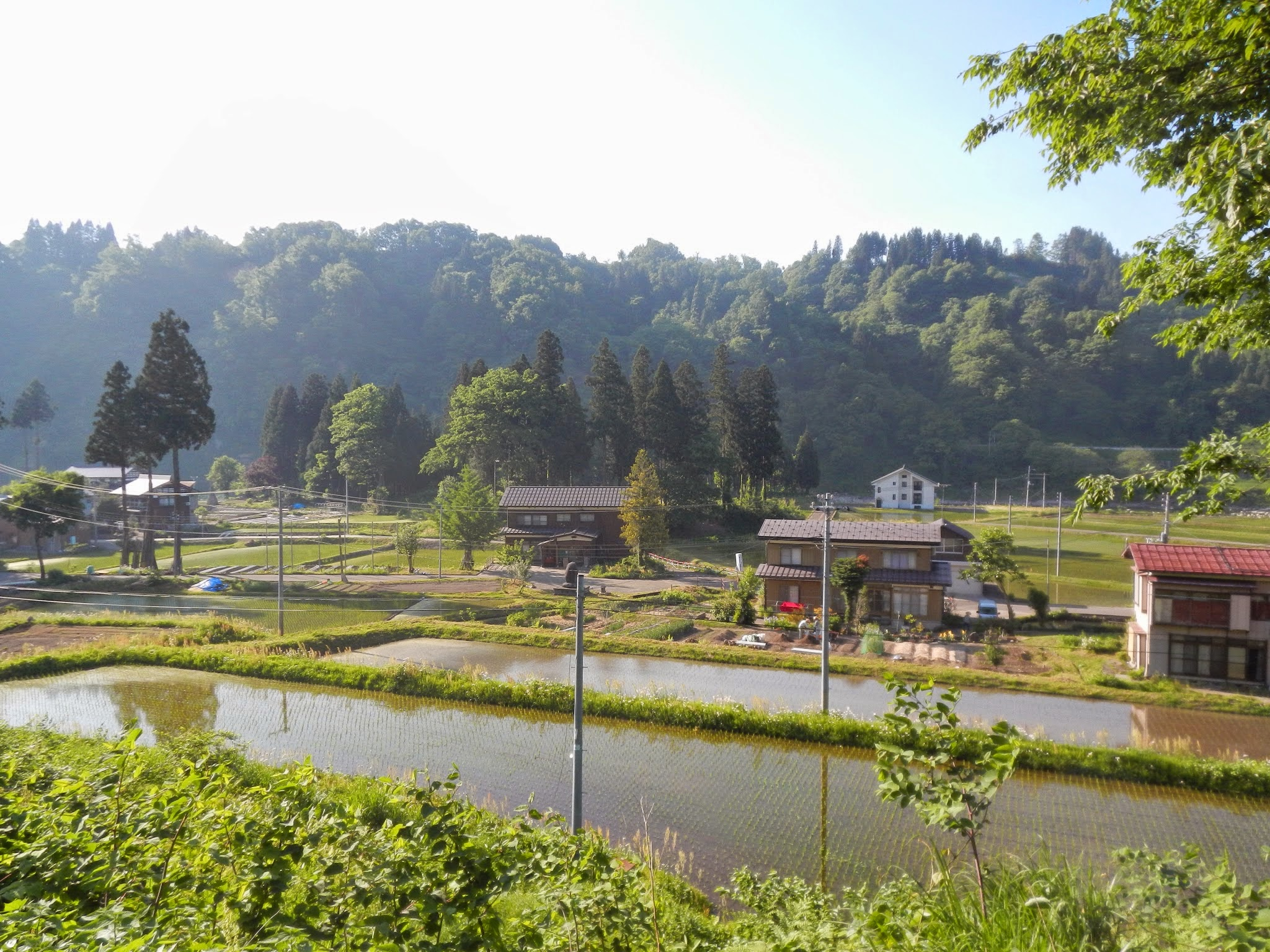
Akasawa neighborhood in Tsunan

Tsunan (津南町, Tsunan-machi) is a town located in Niigata Prefecture, Japan. As of 1 July 2019, the town had an estimated population of 9,349 in 3480 households, and a population density of 54.2 persons per km². The total area of the town was 170.21 square kilometres (65.72 sq mi).

== Geography ==
Tsunan is located in southwestern Niigata Prefecture, in a mountainous area bordering northern Nagano Prefecture. The town is located on a river terrace of the Shinano River with the town hall at an elevation of 241 meters; however, much of the town area is mountainous, with Mount Naeba (2143 meters) partly located within the town limits. Due to its geographical location between the Sea of Japan and the surrounding Japanese Alps, it has one of the highest annual snowfalls in Japan. There are numerous ski resorts within the region.

=== Surrounding municipalities ===
- Nagano Prefecture
  - Sakae
- Niigata Prefecture
  - Tōkamachi
  - Yuzawa

== Climate ==
Tsunan has a humid subtropical climate with continental influences (Köppen Cfa/Dfa) characterized by hot, wet summers and cold winters with heavy snowfall. The average annual temperature in Tsunan is 10.9 °C (51.6 °F). The average annual rainfall is 1,954.0 mm (76.93 in) with September as the wettest month. The temperatures are highest on average in August, at around 23.8 °C (74.8 °F), and lowest in January, at around −1.2 °C (29.8 °F).

Climate data for Tsunan (1991–2020 normals, extremes 1978–present)
| Month | Jan | Feb | Mar | Apr | May | Jun | Jul | Aug | Sep | Oct | Nov | Dec | Year |
|---|---|---|---|---|---|---|---|---|---|---|---|---|---|
| Record high °C (°F) | 13.1 (55.6) | 17.3 (63.1) | 19.8 (67.6) | 28.1 (82.6) | 31.8 (89.2) | 35.2 (95.4) | 34.8 (94.6) | 35.0 (95.0) | 33.8 (92.8) | 31.8 (89.2) | 23.5 (74.3) | 19.6 (67.3) | 35.2 (95.4) |
| Mean daily maximum °C (°F) | 1.8 (35.2) | 2.6 (36.7) | 6.3 (43.3) | 13.4 (56.1) | 20.3 (68.5) | 23.5 (74.3) | 26.9 (80.4) | 28.4 (83.1) | 24.0 (75.2) | 17.8 (64.0) | 11.6 (52.9) | 5.0 (41.0) | 15.1 (59.2) |
| Daily mean °C (°F) | −1.2 (29.8) | −0.9 (30.4) | 2.1 (35.8) | 8.0 (46.4) | 14.9 (58.8) | 19.0 (66.2) | 22.7 (72.9) | 23.8 (74.8) | 19.6 (67.3) | 13.5 (56.3) | 7.3 (45.1) | 1.7 (35.1) | 10.9 (51.6) |
| Mean daily minimum °C (°F) | −4.4 (24.1) | −4.8 (23.4) | −2.0 (28.4) | 3.3 (37.9) | 9.8 (49.6) | 15.1 (59.2) | 19.3 (66.7) | 20.1 (68.2) | 15.9 (60.6) | 9.6 (49.3) | 3.5 (38.3) | −1.4 (29.5) | 7.0 (44.6) |
| Record low °C (°F) | −15.8 (3.6) | −16.5 (2.3) | −14.2 (6.4) | −8.1 (17.4) | 0.1 (32.2) | 6.8 (44.2) | 10.5 (50.9) | 11.5 (52.7) | 5.5 (41.9) | −0.9 (30.4) | −5.8 (21.6) | −11.1 (12.0) | −16.5 (2.3) |
| Average precipitation mm (inches) | 234.1 (9.22) | 146.9 (5.78) | 119.3 (4.70) | 88.8 (3.50) | 97.6 (3.84) | 130.4 (5.13) | 199.9 (7.87) | 172.9 (6.81) | 181.2 (7.13) | 165.3 (6.51) | 161.1 (6.34) | 241.3 (9.50) | 1,954 (76.93) |
| Average snowfall cm (inches) | 436 (172) | 313 (123) | 191 (75) | 58 (23) | 3 (1.2) | 0 (0) | 0 (0) | 0 (0) | 0 (0) | 0 (0) | 26 (10) | 290 (114) | 1,301 (512) |
| Average precipitation days (≥ 1.0 mm) | 23.3 | 19.0 | 18.4 | 13.2 | 12.0 | 13.0 | 14.9 | 12.9 | 14.2 | 14.1 | 16.5 | 21.3 | 192.9 |
| Mean monthly sunshine hours | 53.1 | 71.4 | 101.1 | 157.3 | 196.2 | 145.5 | 136.6 | 178.6 | 124.7 | 120.0 | 99.2 | 69.5 | 1,447 |
Source: Japan Meteorological Agency (1991–2020 normals, extremes 1978–present)

== Demographics ==
Per Japanese census data, the population of Tsunan has declined steadily over the past 70 years and is now considerably less than it was a century ago.

Historical population
| Year | Pop. | ±% |
|---|---|---|
| 1920 | 16,326 | — |
| 1930 | 18,751 | +14.9% |
| 1940 | 21,843 | +16.5% |
| 1950 | 21,684 | −0.7% |
| 1960 | 20,072 | −7.4% |
| 1970 | 16,092 | −19.8% |
| 1980 | 13,841 | −14.0% |
| 1990 | 12,955 | −6.4% |
| 2000 | 12,389 | −4.4% |
| 2010 | 10,881 | −12.2% |
| 2020 | 8,989 | −17.4% |

== History ==
The area of present-day Tsunan was part of ancient Echigo Province and was tenryō territory under the direct control of the Tokugawa shogunate in the Edo period. Following the Meiji restoration, the area was organised into various villages within Nakauonuma District, Niigata The town of Tsunan was established on January 1, 1955 by the merger of the villages of Tomaru, Kamigō, Ashigasaki, Akinari, Nakafukami and Shimofunato.

== Government ==
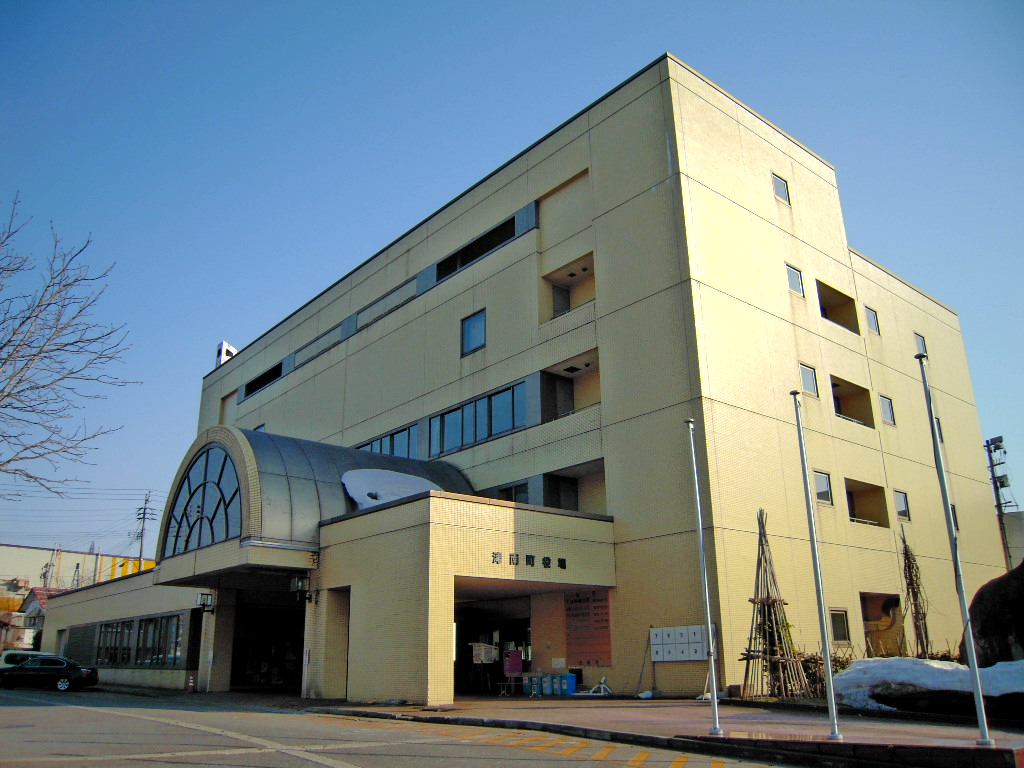
Tsunan town hall

Tsunan has a mayor-council form of government with a directly elected mayor and a unicameral city council of 14 members. Tsunan, together with the city of Tōkamachi, collectively contributes two member to the Niigata Prefectural Assembly. In terms of national politics, the town is part of Niigata 6th district of the lower house of the Diet of Japan.

== Economy ==
The local economy is dominated by agriculture. The area is known for its rice, sake, tomatoes, sunflowers, and buckwheat noodles. The town is also within commuting distance of neighbouring Tōkamachi.

== Education ==
Tsunan has three public elementary schools and one public middle school operated by the town government. There is one public high school operated by the Niigata Prefecture Board of Education.

== Transportation ==
=== Railway ===
JR East - Iiyama Line

- Ashidaki - Echigo-Tanaka - Tsunan - Echigo-Shikawatari

=== Highway ===
- National Route 117
- National Route 353
- National Route 405

== Local attractions ==
- Echigo-Tsumari Art Triennial
- Nishiotaki Dam
- Okinohara Site, Jomon period ruins, a National Historic Site
- Ryu-ga-kubo, one of the 100 Famous Springs of Japan
