= Echigo-Shikawatari Station =

Railway station in Tsunan, Niigata Prefecture, Japan

Echigo-Shikawatari Station 越後鹿渡駅
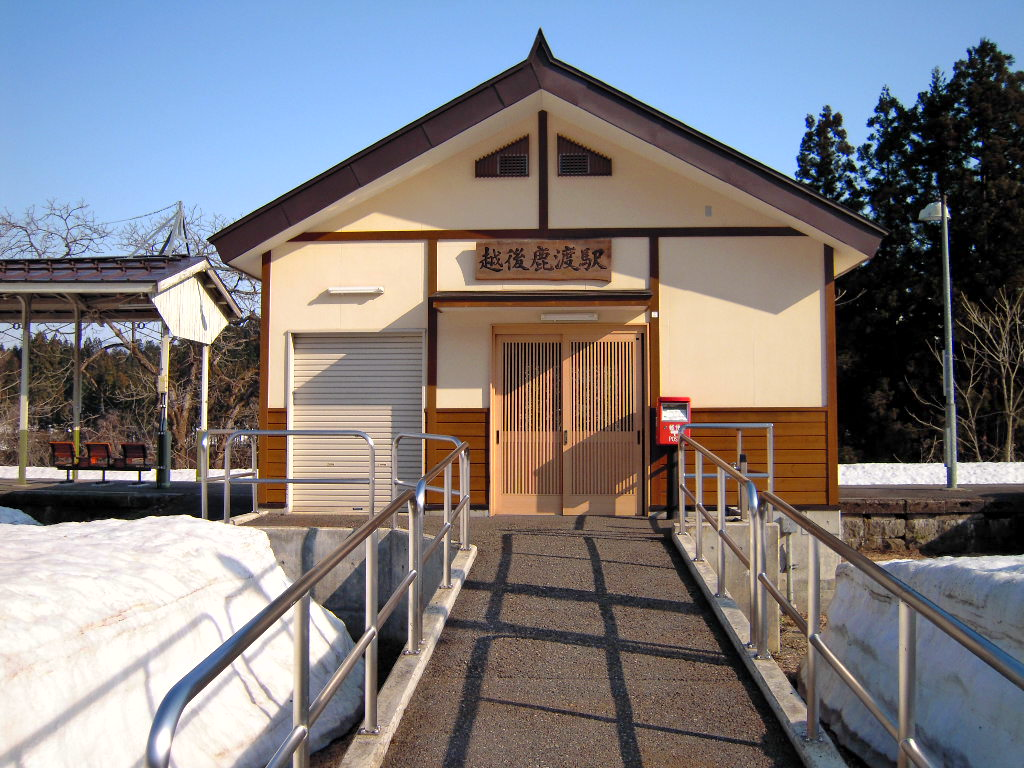
- Echigo-Shikawatari Station in April 2010

General information
- Location: Sanga, Tsunan-machi, Nakauonuma-gun, Niigata-ken 949-8207; Japan
- Coordinates: 37.0480°N 138.6715°E
- Operator: JR East
- Line: ■ Iiyama Line
- Distance: 62.1 kilometres (38.6 mi) from Toyono
- Platforms: 1 side platform

Other information
- Status: Unstaffed
- Website: www.jreast.co.jp/estation/station/info.aspx?StationCd=272

History
- Opened: 6 November 1927

Services
Preceding station	JR East	Following station
Tsunan towards Nagano	Iiyama Line	Echigo-Tazawa towards Echigo-Kawaguchi
Location
- Location within Japan

Echigo-Shikawatari Station (越後鹿渡駅, Echigo-Shikawatari-eki) is a railway station in the town of Tsunan, Nakauonuma District, Niigata Prefecture, Japan operated by East Japan Railway Company (JR East).

== Lines ==
Echigo-Shikawatari Station is served by the Iiyama Line, and is 62.1 kilometers from the starting point of the line at Toyono Station.

== Station layout ==
The station consists of one side platform serving a single bi-directional track. The station is unattended.

== History ==
Echigo-Shikawatari Station opened on 6 November 1927. With the privatization of Japanese National Railways (JNR) on 1 April 1987, the station came under the control of JR East. A new station building was completed in 2002.

== Surrounding area ==
- Shinano River
- Matsunoyama Onsen
- National Route 353

== See also ==
- List of railway stations in Japan
