= Tanaka (restaurant) =

Japanese restaurant in Portland, Oregon, U.S.

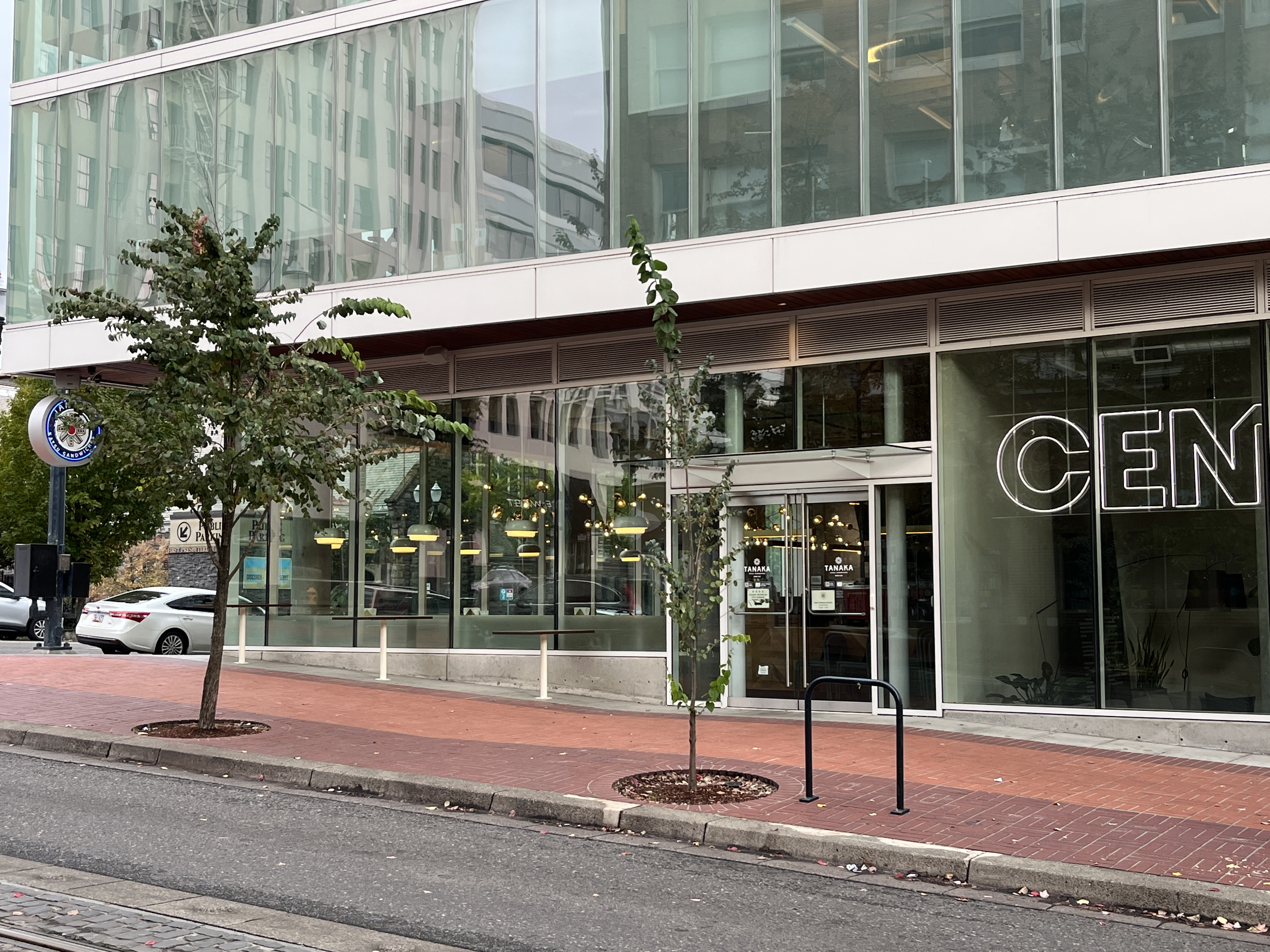
- The restaurant's exterior, 2022
- Interactive map of Tanaka

Restaurant information
- Food type: Japanese
- Location: 678 Southwest 12th Avenue, Portland, Multnomah, Oregon, 97205, United States
- Coordinates: 45.5207°N 122.6838°W

Tanaka is a small chain of Japanese restaurants in the Portland, Oregon metropolitan area, in the United States. The original location has operated in downtown Portland since 2022. A second location opened in Bridgeport Village in 2023, and a third followed in Gresham in 2024.

== Description ==
Tanaka is a small chain of Japanese bakeries and katsu sandwich shops in the Portland metropolitan area. The original shop operates on Morrison Street in downtown Portland's West End. There are also locations in Bridgeport Village and in Gresham.

Brooke Jackson-Glidden of Eater Portland has described the business as "part Japanese patisserie, part katsu sandwich shop, [and] part brunch cafe". Andi Prewitt of Willamette Week called Tanaka a "spinoff of Japanese-based chain Kushikatsu Tanaka, which specializes in skewers (kushi) of bite-sized, breaded cutlets (katsu) served with a dipping sauce whose recipe has remained a well-guarded family secret for 70 years." The original restaurant has indoor and outdoor seating, and the interior features a wall decoration with the text, "Of everything in the world, who knew bread would bring all these beautiful people together?"

=== Menu ===
Sandwich options have included chicken, pork, chicken, Oregon rockfish, and wagyu beef, all with shokupan (Japanese milk bread). The restaurant has also served a vegan option with oat milk, which Jackson-Glidden said in 2022 was the city's only dairy-free milk bread option. The menu has also included Japanese fruit sandwiches with milk bread and whipped cream, dorayaki, macarons (such as pistachio and ume varieties), matcha and miso croissants, mochi doughnuts, and coffee. Other pastries have included "black-sesame-raspberry Paris Brest, yuzu meringue tart with shiso and blackberries, a pyramid of pistachio sponge with raspberry compote and dark chocolate mousse."

== History ==
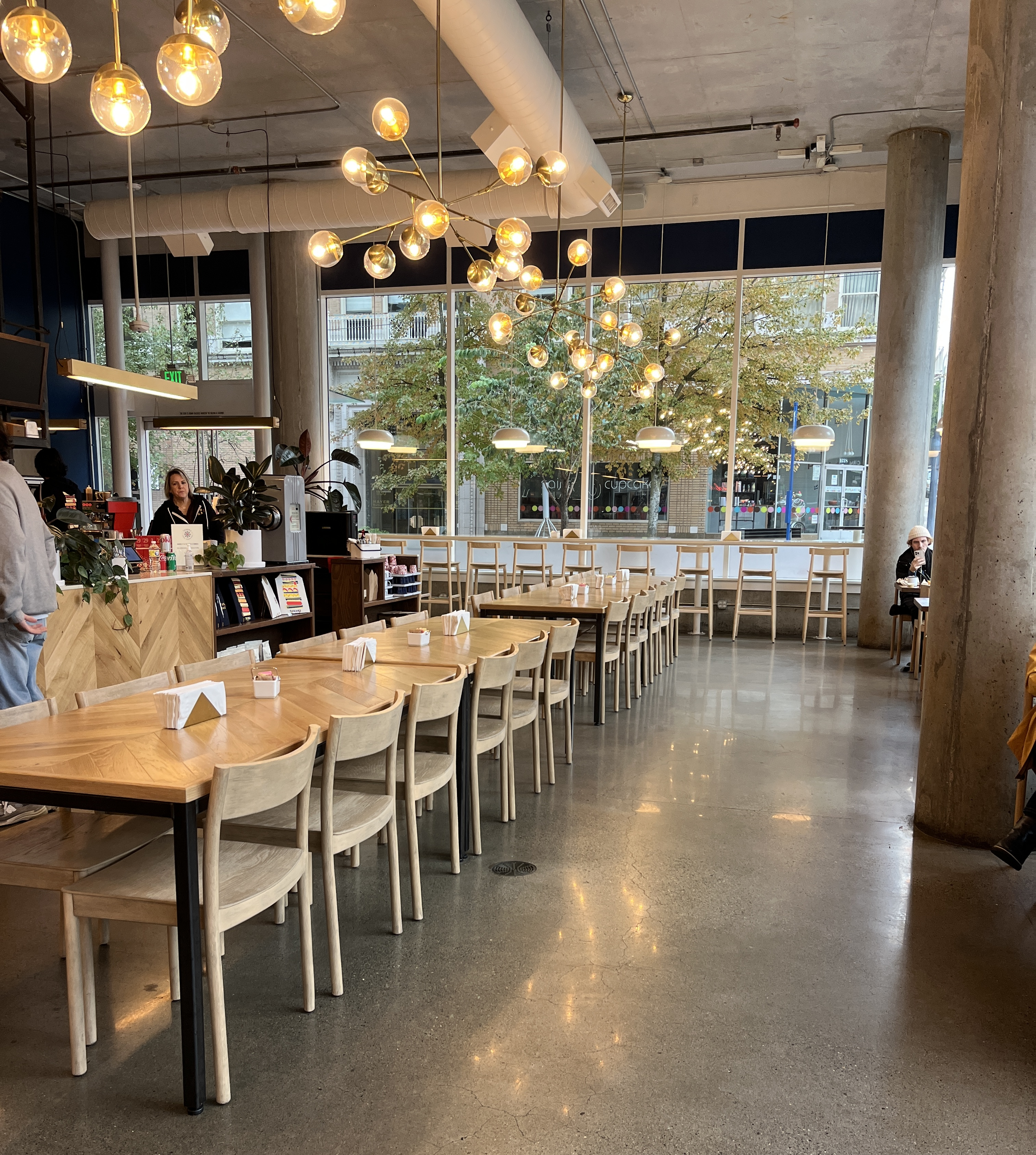
Interior of the original restaurant, 2022

The team behind Afuri opened Tanaka on June 25, 2022, in a 5,500-square-foot space in downtown Portland that had previously housed a Blue Star Donuts shop. A second location opened in Bridgeport Village on August 22, 2023. A third location opened in Gresham on June 8, 2024.

Taichi Ishizuki is the business' chief executive officer.

== Reception ==
Katherine Chew Hamilton of Portland Monthly recommended the chicken katsu, eggplant, and pork katsu sandos, as well as the matcha opera cake and the miso chocolate chip cookie. She described Tanaka as "welcoming and expansive" and wrote, "Our take, overall, is that you can find better baked goods at Oyatsupan, and better sandos at Tokyo Sando. But on days that call for a sit-down lunch downtown, perhaps as an escape from the office or between museum-going, Tanaka is a good bet." Eater Portland's Brooke Jackson-Glidden included the business in a 2022 list of the city's "hottest" new restaurants and food carts. The website's Michelle Lopez also included Tanaka in a 2022 overview of "outstanding" bakeries in the metropolitan area.

== See also ==
- List of bakeries
- List of Japanese restaurants
- List of restaurant chains in the United States
