= Hakunetsusha =

Company

Hakunetsusha (白熱舎) was a company established by Shōichi Miyoshi and Fujioka Ichisuke, two of Japan's industrial pioneers during the Tokugawa / Edo period. It specialized in the manufacturing of light bulbs.

The company was established in 1890, and started out by selling bulbs using bamboo filaments. However, following the opening up of trade with the West through the Unequal treaty, Hakunetsusha met with fierce competition from imports. Its bulb cost about 60 per cent more than the imports and the quality was poorer. The company managed to survive with the booms after the First Sino-Japanese War of 1894–95 and the Russo-Japanese War of 1904–05, but afterward its financial position was precarious.

In 1905 the company was renamed Tokyo Denki (Tokyo Electric) and entered into a financial and technological collaboration with General Electric of USA. General Electric acquired 51 percent share of ownership, sent a vice president, and provided the technology for bulb-making. Production equipment was bought from GE and Tokyo Denki soon started selling its products with GE's trademark.

In 1939, Tokyo Denki and Shibaura Seisakusho were merged to form Tokyo Shibaura Denki (Tokyo Shibaura Electric Company, now Toshiba).
