= Echigo-Tanaka Station =

Railway station in Tsunan, Niigata Prefecture, Japan

Echigo-Tanaka Station 越後田中駅
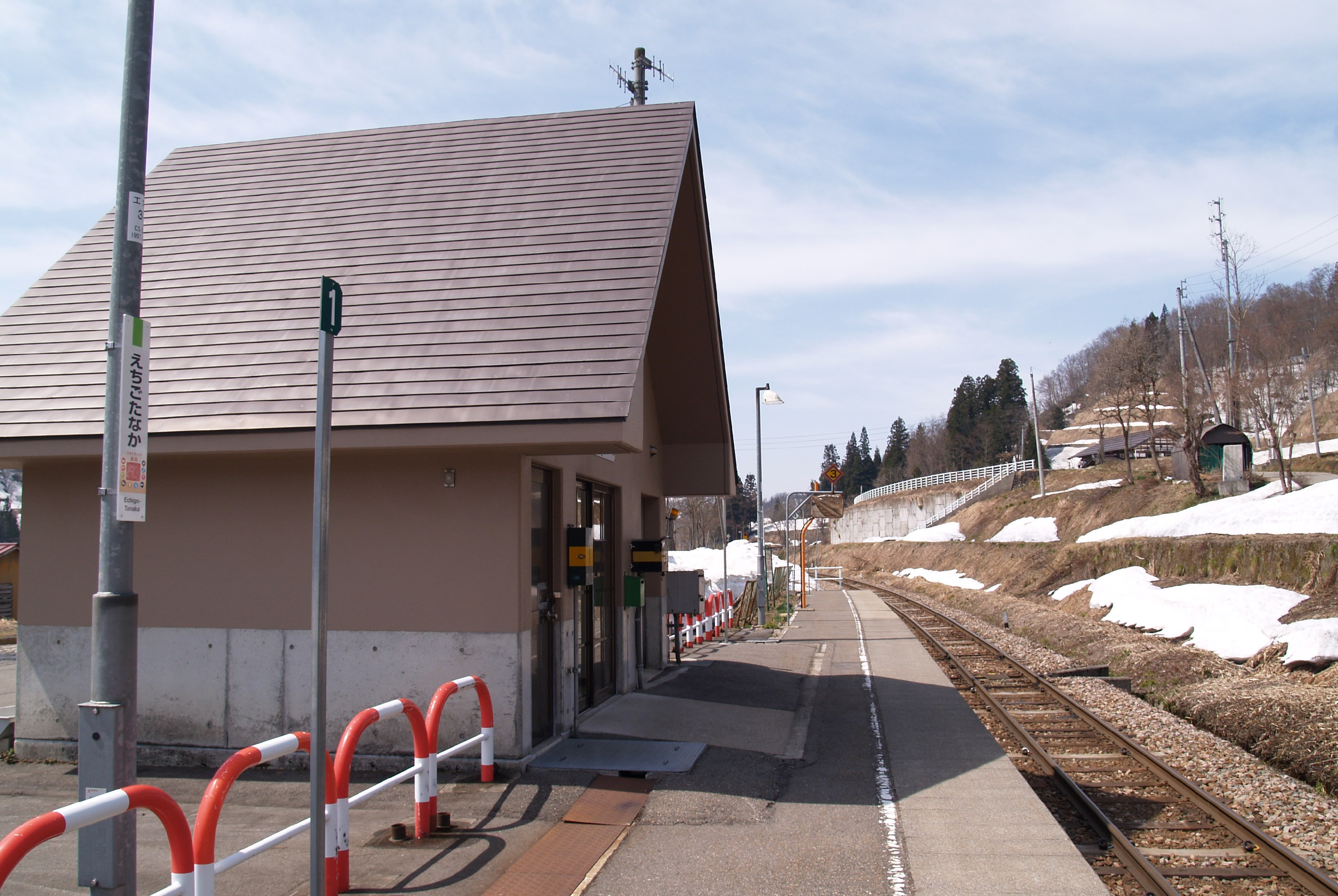
- Echigo-Tanaka Station in April 2010

General information
- Location: Kamigō-Ueda, Tsunan-machi, Nakauonuma-gun, Niigata-ken 949-8200; Japan
- Coordinates: 37.0052°N 138.6272°E
- Operator: JR East
- Line: ■ Iiyama Line
- Distance: 55.9 kilometres (34.7 mi) from Toyono
- Platforms: 1 side platform
- Tracks: 1

Other information
- Status: Unstaffed
- Website: www.jreast.co.jp/estation/station/info.aspx?StationCd=287

History
- Opened: 1 August 1927

Services
| Preceding station | JR East | Following station |
|---|---|---|
| Ashidaki towards Nagano | Iiyama Line | Tsunan towards Echigo-Kawaguchi |
Location
- Location within Japan

Echigo-Tanaka Station (越後田中駅, Echigo-Tanaka-eki) is a railway station in the town of Tsunan, Nakauonuma District, Niigata Prefecture, Japan operated by East Japan Railway Company (JR East).

== Lines ==
Echigo-Tanaka Station is served by the Iiyama Line, and is 54.9 kilometers from the starting point of the line at Toyono Station.

== Station layout ==
The station consists of one side platform serving a single bi-directional track. The station is unattended.

== History ==
Echigo-Tanaka Station opened on 1 August 1927. With the privatization of Japanese National Railways (JNR) on 1 April 1987, the station came under the control of JR East. A new station building was completed in 1998.

== Surrounding area ==
- National Route 117

== See also ==
- List of railway stations in Japan
