= Tanaka formula =

Tanaka formula may refer to:

- Tanaka equation, a kind of differential equation
- Tanaka's formula, a kind of differential equation
- Tanaka formula, a formula for determining maximum heart rate based on age
