= Tsunan Station =

Railway station in Tsunan, Niigata Prefecture, Japan

Tsunan Station 津南駅
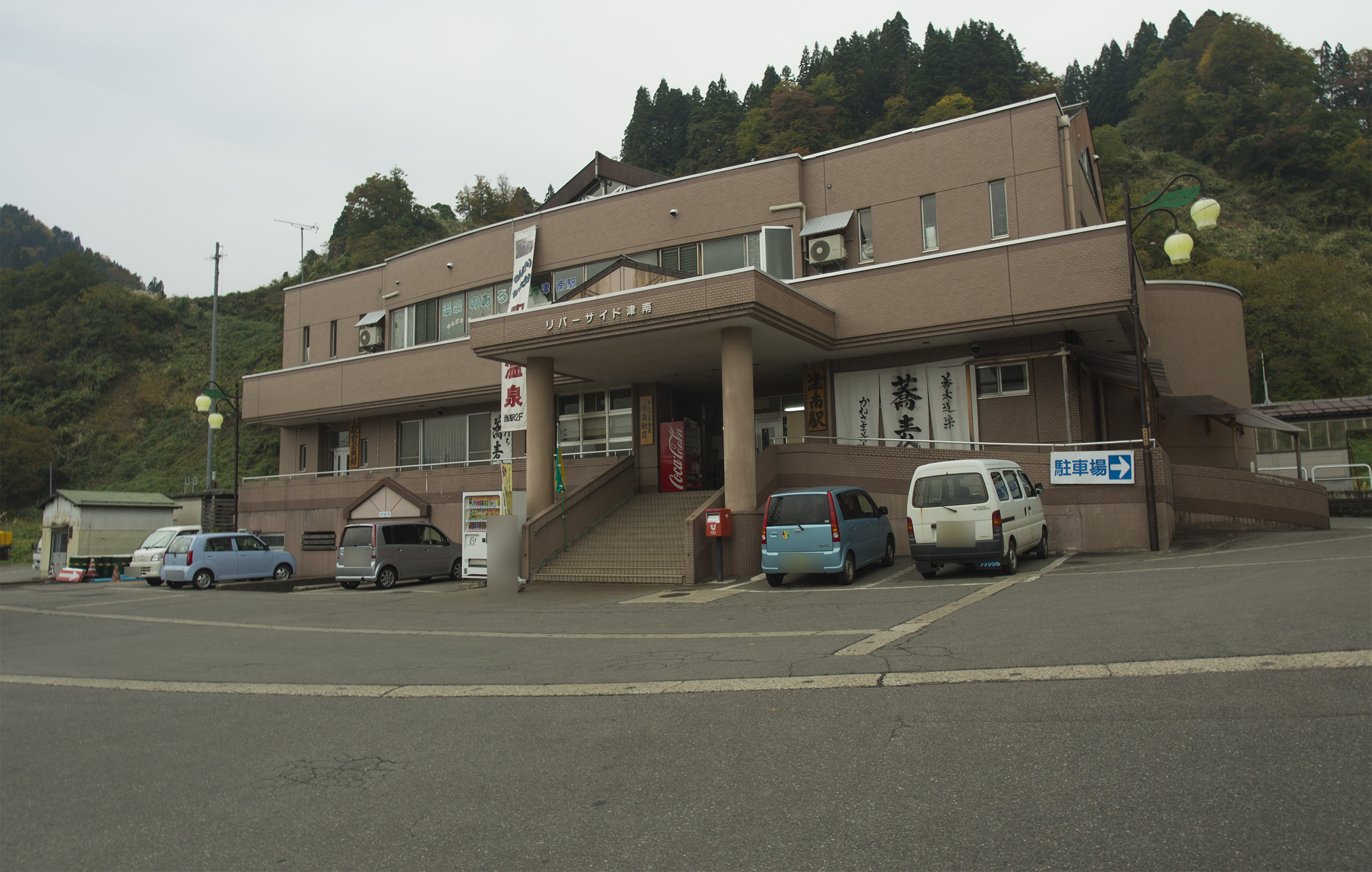
- Tsunan Station in October 2013

General information
- Location: Tomaru, Tsunan-machi, Nakauonuma-gun, Niigata-ken 949-8206; Japan
- Coordinates: 37.0235°N 138.6396°E
- Operator: JR East
- Line: ■ Iiyama Line
- Distance: 57.9 kilometres (36.0 mi) from Toyono
- Platforms: 1 side platform
- Tracks: 1

Other information
- Status: staffed
- Website: Official website

History
- Opened: 1 August 1927
- Former names: Echigo-Tomaru (until 1968)

Passengers
- FY2017: 80

Services
Preceding station	JR East	Following station
Echigo-Tanaka towards Nagano	Iiyama Line	Echigo-Shikawatari towards Echigo-Kawaguchi
Location
- Location within Japan

Tsunan Station (津南駅, Tsunan-eki) is a railway station in the town of Tsunan, Nakauonuma District, Niigata Prefecture, Japan operated by East Japan Railway Company (JR East).

== Lines ==
Tsunan Station is served by the Iiyama Line, and is 57.9 kilometers from the starting point of the line at Toyono Station.

== Station layout ==
The station consists of one side platform serving a single bi-directional track. The station building is staffed, and includes an onsen public bath on its second story.

== History ==
Tsunan Station opened on 1 August 1927 as Echigo-Tomaru Station (越後外丸駅). It was renamed to its present name on 1 October 1968. With the privatization of Japanese National Railways (JNR) on 1 April 1987, the station came under the control of JR East.

== Passenger statistics ==
In fiscal 2017, the station was used by an average of 525 passengers daily (boarding passengers only).

== Surrounding area ==
- National Route 117

== See also ==
- List of railway stations in Japan
