= Makoto Sei Watanabe =

Japanese architect living in Tokyo (born 1952)

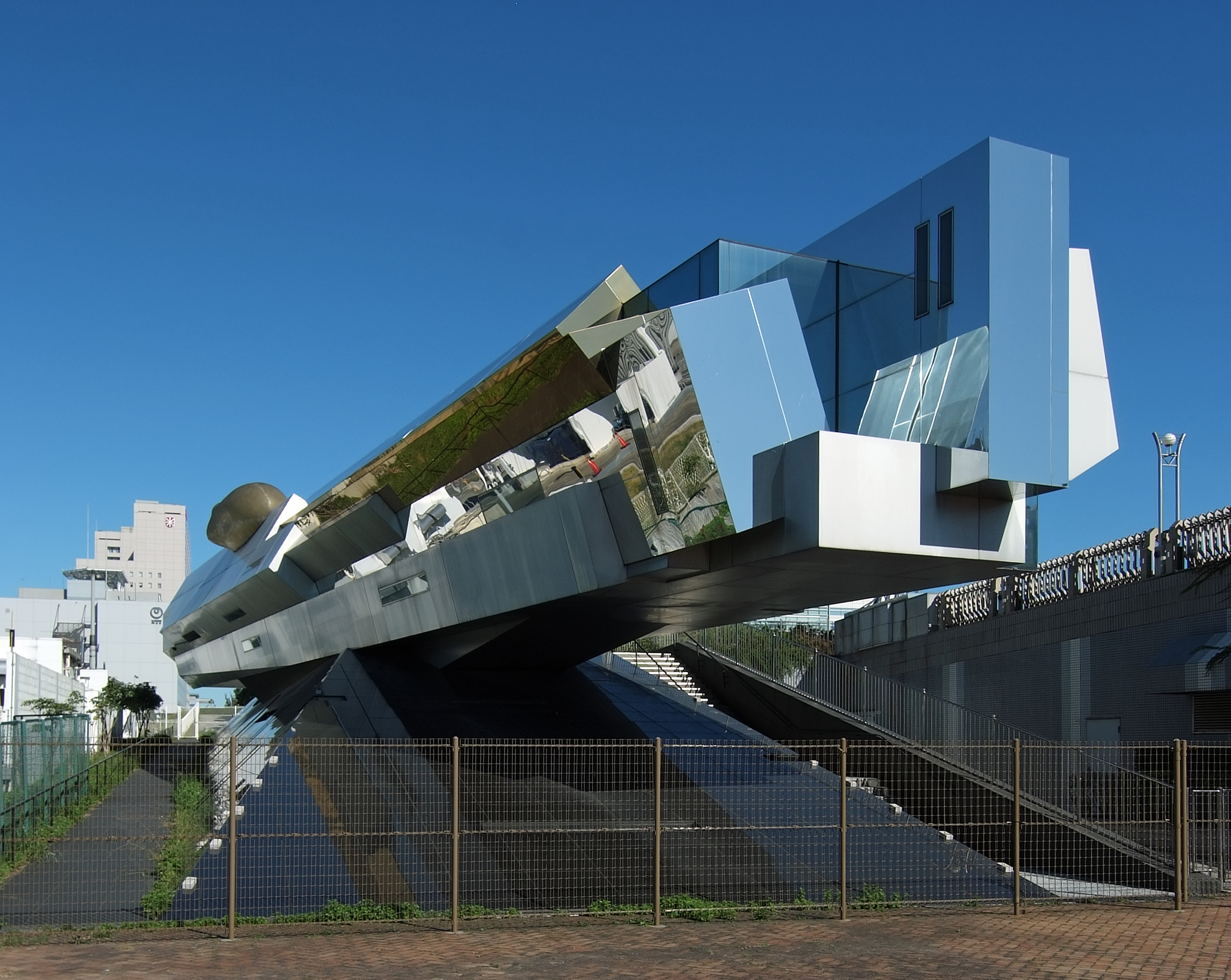
- K Museum, Ariake, Tokyo
- Born: 1952 (age 73–74); Yokohama, Japan
- Education: Yokohama National University Graduate School
- Occupation: Architect
- Works: Aoyama Technical College; K-Museum, etc.
- Awards: ASLA Professional Award; AIJ Prize, etc.

Makoto Sei Watanabe is a Japanese architect.

He has been experimenting with programmatic generation of architecture since the 1990s, and has already been developing and implementing AI since 2001.

His activities encompass not only architectural design but also research, artwork, drawing, organizing international competitions, and even writing a novel.

== Biography ==
In junior high school, he belonged to the biology club. In high school, he aspired to study biology at university, but on the recommendation of his biology teacher, he chose architecture as a field that combines both science and art.
He graduated from Yokohama National University Graduate School in 1976, worked at Arata Isozaki Atelier, and then started MAKOTO SEI WATANABE / ARCHITECTS' OFFICE in 1984.

His first actual work, "AOYAMA TECHNICAL COLLEGE" (1990), which was the winning entry of the international competition, attracted attention for its bold design.

And another series in a different direction, a project called "JELLY FISH" (1990), which could be described as minimalism, was announced at the same time as "AOYAMA TECHNICAL COLLEGE".

Concurrently, he explored theoretical aspects and, based on his interest in biology, conducted research that viewed cities and architecture not from the perspective of conventional 'design' but from that of 'generation'.

He then released "INDUCTION DESIGN" (1994) as a method of generating architecture and cities using computer programs by algorithmizing the conditions to be solved. This method, later termed "ALGOrithmic Design", culminated in "SUBWAY STATION / IIDABASHI" (2000).
Subsequently, he developed the AI program "program of FLOW" (2001) based on this method and used it to complete "Tsukuba Express / Kashiwanoha-Campus Station" (2004).
Its successor AI program, "pBM: project Beautiful Mind", is under development.

In addition, he has received numerous awards both in Japan and abroad, including for his artwork "FIBER WAVE" (1995). He has also authored many books, and served as a university professor at home and abroad.

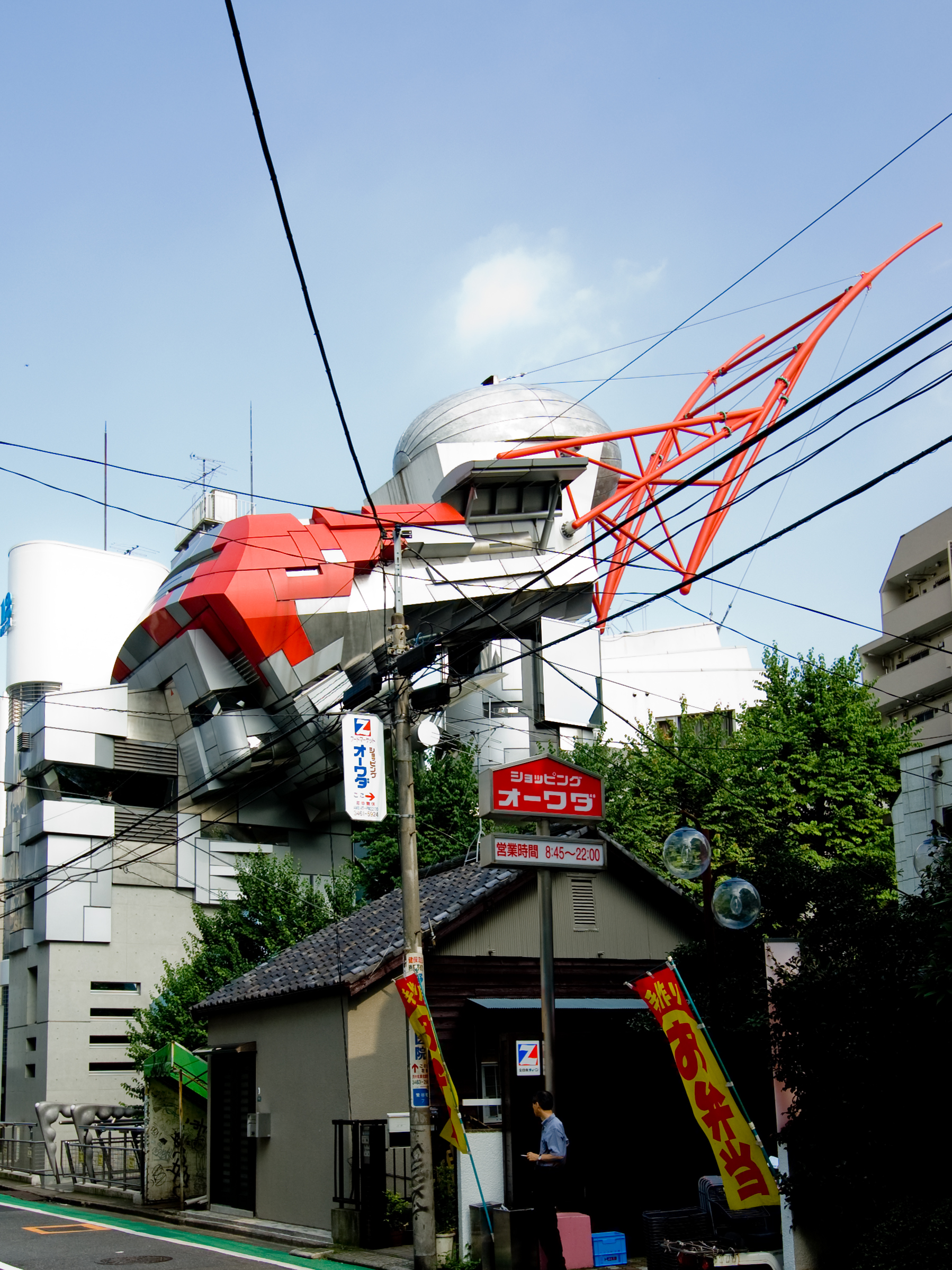
Aoyama Technical College, Tokyo

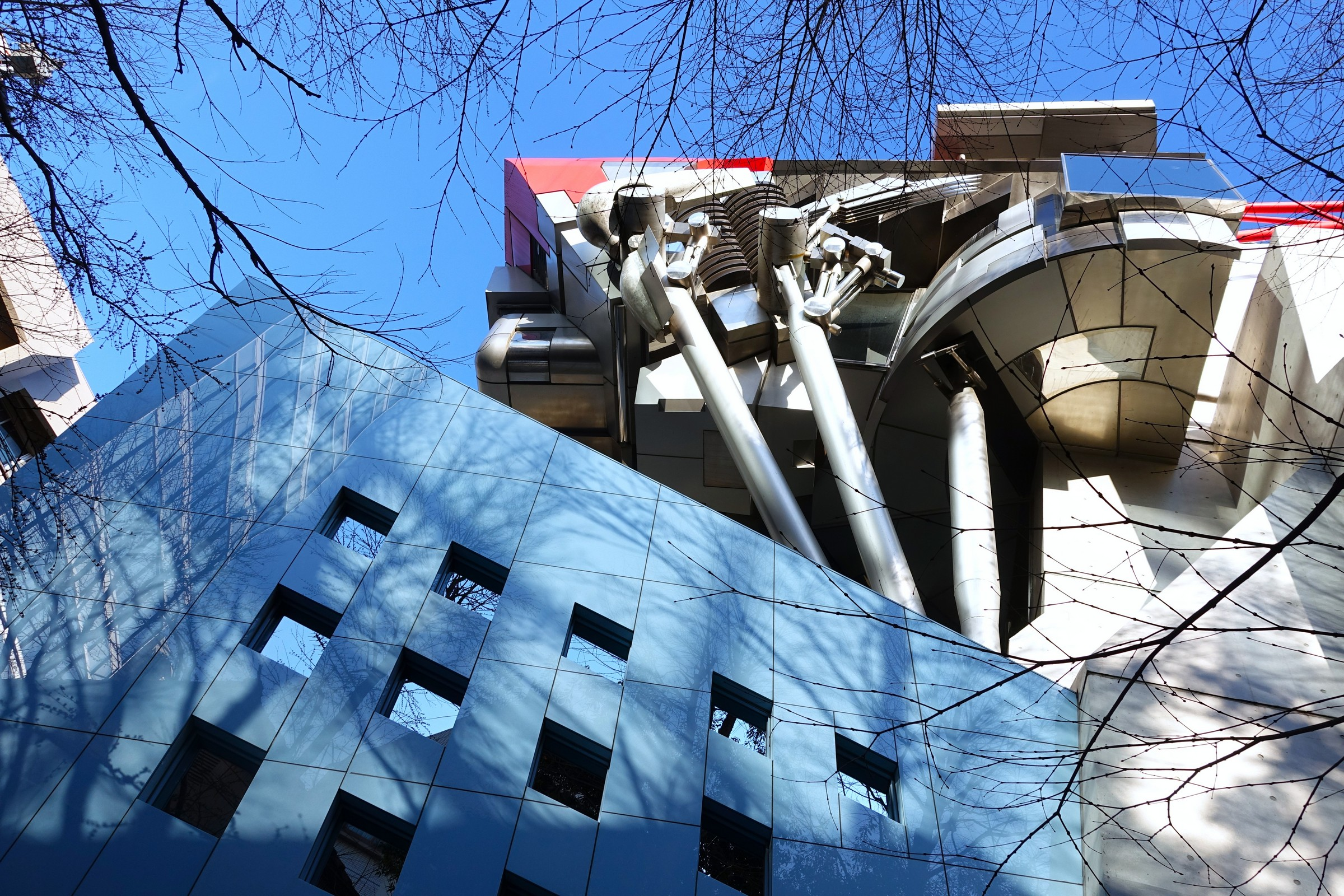
AOYAMA TECHNICAL COLLEGE

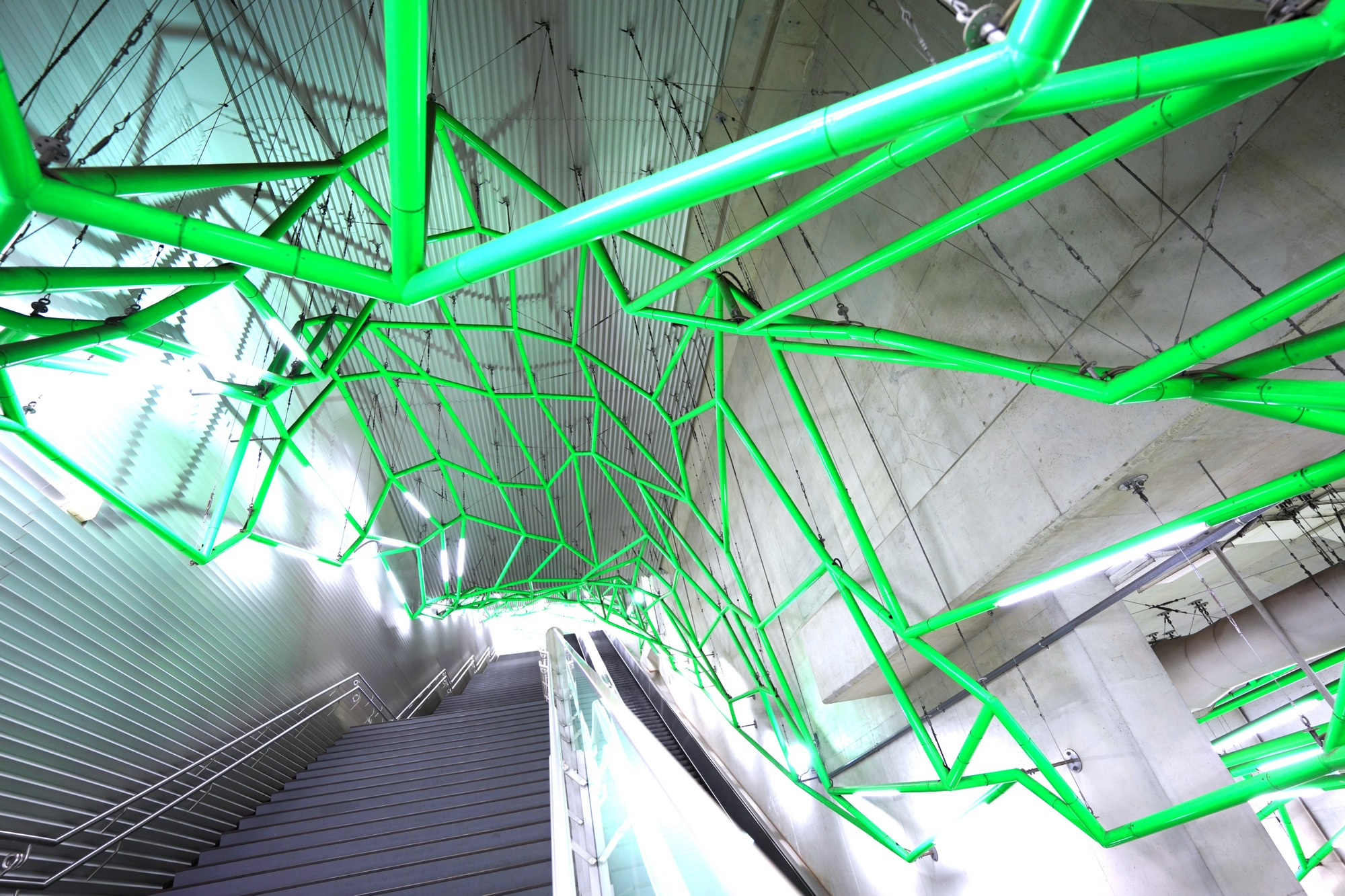
WEB FRAME of Subway Station Iidabashi: A mesh-formed structure generated by a computer program that solves the necessary conditions is deployed in the underground space.

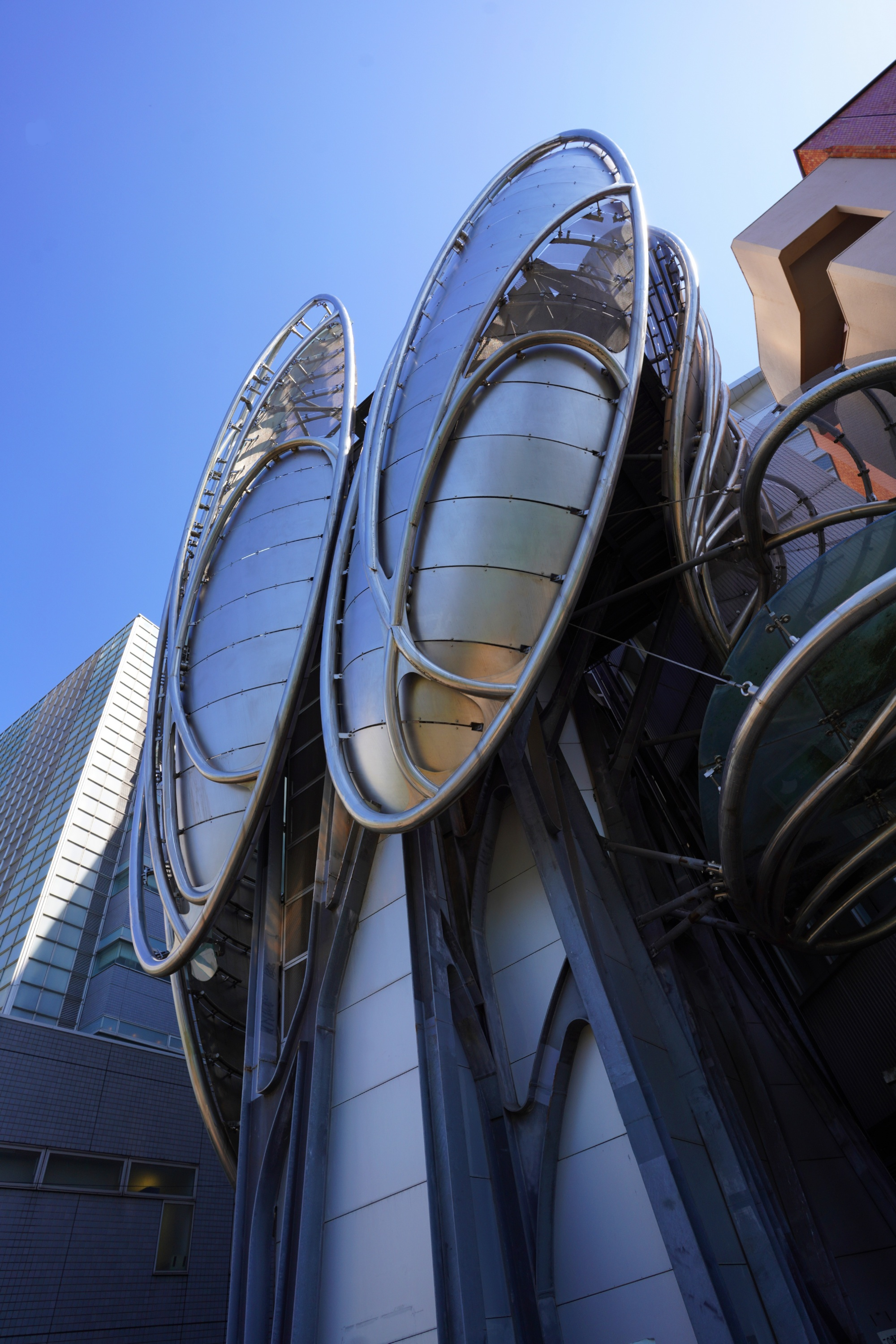
WING of Subway Station Iidabashi

== Major works ==
Title	Year	City	Region	Note
AOYAMA TECHNICAL COLLEGE building-1（AOYAMASEIZ Institute of Technology）	1990	Tokyo		First Prize / International Competition
N.Y. Transparent Toilet	1993	New York	USA	Awarded / International Competition
Mura-no Terrace (Village Terrace)	1995	Gifu		
FIBER WAVE series	1995-	Gifu, Tokyo, Graz, Vigo, etc.	Austria, Spain, etc.	Artwork
ATLAS	1996	Tokyo		
K-MUSEUM	1996	Tokyo		
SUBWAY STATION / IIDABASHI	2000	Tokyo		First Prize / Proposal
Shinkansen / ShinMinamata Station	2004	Kumamoto		
ShinMinamata MON	2005	Kumamoto		
Tsukuba Express / Kashiwanoha-Campus Station	2004	Chiba		
Tsukuba Express / Kashiwa-Tanaka Station	2004	Chiba		
RIBBON	2005	Graz	Austria	Museum exhibition design
Shanghai House	2005	Shanghai	China	
TOKYO HOUSE	2006	Tokyo		
RIBBONs / open-air theater (Fulfillment Amphitheatre / Wenxin Forest Park in Taichung)	2009	Taichung	Taiwan	
WEB FRAME -II	2011	Tokyo		

== Major Design Competitions ==
Title	Year	Award	Region
International Design Competition for AOYAMA TECHNICAL COLLEGE building-1	1988	First Prize	
Design Competition for Osaka Pref. Peace Museum	1989	Awarded	
Design Proposal for Tokyo Metropolitan Subway Line-12 Station	1991	First Prize	
Design Proposal for Hyogo Performing Arts Center	1992	Awarded	
Urban Outhouse Design Competition	1993	Awarded	USA
ROEBLING GATEWAY PARK DESIGN COMPETITION	1995	Awarded	USA
International Design Competition for Milan 2001	2000	Awarded	

== Major Research and Development ==
Title	Year	Executed Architectural Work (Title of the program applied)
INDUCTION DESIGN	1994--	
ALGORITHMIC DESIGN	2005	
	2000	SUBWAY STATION / IIDABASHI (WEB FRAME)
	2011	(WEB FRAME II)
	2005	ShinMinamata MON (KeiRiki program)
	2006	TOKYO HOUSE (Environmental Color Program)
AItect series (Design Support AI Program Development)	2001--	
AItect - Subsidized Research: MITOU (programs for the next generation IT innovation leaders) by IPA 'Sensory-sensitive Architecture and Urbanism Generation Program'; AI program: program of FLOW	2001 - 2003	
	2004	TX Kashiwanoha-Campus Station (program of FLOW )
AItect - Subsidized Research: CREST (Core Research for Evolutional Science and Technology) by JST 'Bayesian Optimization in Architectural Design'; AI program: pBM = project Beautiful Mind (Joint Research with the University of Tokyo)	2017- 2023--	
Organizer: ALGODeQ: ALGOrithmic Design Quest international programming competition	2013 - 2014	
Organizer : AQS: Algorithmic design Quest international Symposium	2015	

== Professorships ==
University	Position	Period
Tamkang University (Taiwan) Faculty of Engineering Department of Architecture	Chair Professor	2005-2010
Okayama Prefectural University Faculty of Design, Department of Architecture	Professor	2010-2013
Tokyo City University Faculty of Urban Life Studies	Professor	2013-2017

== Major awards ==
Title	Year	Award	Work	Region
SD Review	1988,1989,1990	Asakura Award, etc.	JELLY FISH, etc.	
HYLAR International Award	1994	Award	AOYAMA TECHNICAL COLLEGE	USA
JCD Design Award	1996	Award	Mura-no Terrace	
Good Design Award	1996	Award	Mura-no Terrace	
Chubu Architectural Award	1996	Award	Mura-no Terrace	
IALD International Lighting Design Awards	1997	Award	FIBER WAVE (K-MUSEUM)	USA
IES Illumination Awards	1997	Award	FIBER WAVE (K-MUSEUM)	USA
JCD Design Award	1997	Award	K-MUSEUM	
SDA Award	1997	SDA Grand Prize	K-MUSEUM	
ASLA Professional Awards	1997	Award	K-MUSEUM	USA
Waterfront Award	1997	Award	Mura-no Terrace	USA
The Japan Federation of Architects and Building Engineers Associations Award	1997	Award	Mura-no Terrace	
Urban Landscape Award by the Ministry of Land, Infrastructure, Transport and Tourism (MLIT)	1997	Award	FIBER WAVE (K-MUSEUM)	
iF Design Award	1998	Top 10 Awards	FIBER WAVE	Germany
iF Design Award	1998	Award	N.Y. Transparent Toilet	Germany
The Marble Architectural Awards (MAA)	1998	First Prize	K-MUSEUM	Italy
Good Design Award	2001	Gold Award	SUBWAY STATION / IIDABASHI (Selected stations)	
JIA (Japan Institute of Architects) New Designer Award	2001	Award	SUBWAY STATION / IIDABASHI	
Architectural Institute of Japan Award	2002	Award	SUBWAY STATION / IIDABASHI	
1st Environment and Equipment Design Award	2002	Grand Prize	SUBWAY STATION / IIDABASHI	
The Institute of Electrical Installation Engineers of Japan Award	2005	Award	SUBWAY STATION / IIDABASHI	
Public Building Award	2008	Special Award and Excellence Award	Shinkansen / ShinMinamata Station (Architectural Design and Surrounding Area Design Direction)	

== Major publications ==
Title	Year	Type	Publisher	Region
Kentiku-Ka (Architect )	1992	Essay	Jitsugyo-no-nihon-sha	
Ryutai-Toshi (Liquid City)	1998	Novel	Jitsugyo-no-nihon-sha	
MAKOTO SEI WATANABE conceiving the city	1998	Monograph	l'ARCAEDIZIONI	Italy
INDUCTION DESIGN (English edition)	2002	Theory + Work	Birkhäuser	Switzerland/Germany
Kentiku wa yawarakai kagaku ni tikazuku (Evolutionary Design)	2002	Monograph + Theory	Kentiku-shiryo-kenkyu-sha	
INDUCTION DESIGN (Italian edition)	2004	Theory + Work	Testo & Immagine	Italy
makoto sei watanabe	2007	Monograph	EDIL STAMPA	Italy
ALGORITHMIC DESIGN（collaboration: the Architectural Institute of Japan）	2009	Theory + Work	kajima-publishing	
Computer v. Human Brain (the responsible editor/l'ARCA special issue 271)	2011	Theory + Work	l'ARCAEDIZIONI	Italy
ALGOrithmic Design EXecution and logic (ALGODEX)	2012	Theory + Work + Program	Maruzen-publishing	
Machina x Mind International Architecture Workshop MaMiUU	2021	Education	Tamkang University	Taiwan
