= Tanaka Chinyahara =

Zimbabwean professional footballer (born 1995)

Personal information
- Date of birth: 12 October 1995 (age 31)
- Height: 1.68 m (5 ft 6 in)
- Position: Midfielder

Team information
- Current team: Red Arrows

Youth career
- CAPS United
- 2009–2010: Kaizer Chiefs
- 2010–2014: Bidvest Wits

Senior career*
Years	Team	Apps	(Gls)
2014–2015	Bidvest Wits		
2015–2017	Hobro IK	3	(0)
2016	→ Jammerbugt FC (loan)	12	(0)
2019–2020	Witbank Spurs		
2020–	Red Arrows		
- * Club domestic league appearances and goals as of 16:49, 6 November 2020 (UTC)

Tanaka Chinyahara (born 12 October 1995) is a Zimbabwean professional footballer who plays for Zambian club Red Arrows, as a midfielder.

== Club career ==
Chinyahara spent his early career with CAPS United, Kaizer Chiefs and Bidvest Wits.

In July 2015, Chinayhara moved to Danish club Hobro IK. He made his league debut for the club on 18 October 2015 in a 3–1 away loss to F.C. Copenhagen. He was subbed on for Mads Jessen in the 62nd minute. In August 2016, he was loaned out to Danish 2nd Division club Jammerbugt FC for the rest of 2016.

On 7 March 2019, Chinyahara joined South African club Witbank Spurs. In February 2020 he was one of six players to sign for Zambian club Red Arrows.

== International career ==
He was called up by the Zimbabwean national team in October 2020.
