= Japanese clothing =

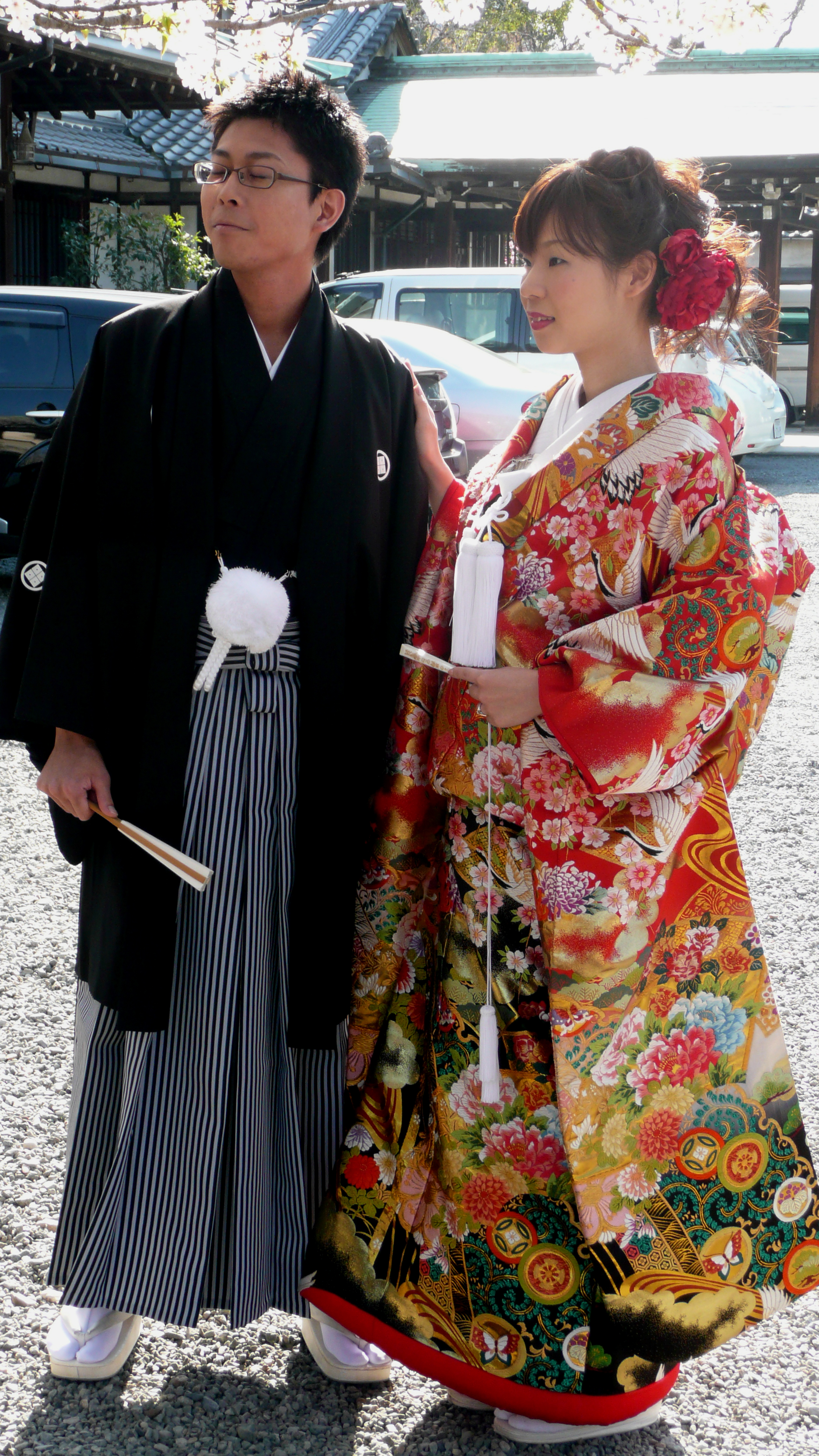
Photograph of a man and woman wearing traditional clothing, taken in Osaka, Japan

There are typically two types of clothing worn in Japan: traditional clothing known as Japanese clothing (和服, wafuku), including the national dress of Japan, the kimono, and Western clothing (洋服, yōfuku) which encompasses all else not recognised as either national dress or the dress of another country.

Traditional Japanese fashion represents a long-standing history of traditional culture, encompassing colour palettes developed in the Heian period, silhouettes adopted from Tang dynasty clothing and cultural traditions, motifs taken from Japanese culture, nature and traditional literature, the use of types of silk for some clothing, and styles of wearing primarily fully-developed by the end of the Edo period. The most well-known form of traditional Japanese fashion is the kimono, with the term kimono translating literally as "something to wear" or "thing worn on the shoulders". Other types of traditional fashion include the clothing of the Ainu people (known as the attus) and the clothes of the Ryukyuan people which is known as ryūsō (琉装), most notably including the traditional fabrics of bingata and bashōfu produced on the Ryukyu Islands.

Modern Japanese fashion mostly encompasses yōfuku (Western clothes), though many well-known Japanese fashion designers – such as Issey Miyake, Yohji Yamamoto and Rei Kawakubo – have taken inspiration from and at times designed clothes taking influence from traditional fashion. Their works represent a combined impact on the global fashion industry, with many pieces displayed at fashion shows all over the world, as well as having had an impact within the Japanese fashion industry itself, with many designers either drawing from or contributing to Japanese street fashion.

Despite previous generations wearing traditional clothing near-entirely, following the end of World War II, Western clothing and fashion became increasingly popular due to their increasingly-available nature and, over time, their cheaper price. It is now increasingly rare for someone to wear traditional clothing as everyday clothes, and over time, traditional clothes within Japan have garnered an association with being difficult to wear and expensive. As such, traditional garments are now mainly worn for ceremonies and special events, with the most common time for someone to wear traditional clothes being to summer festivals, when the yukata is most appropriate; outside of this, the main groups of people most likely to wear traditional clothes are geisha, maiko and sumo wrestlers, all of whom are required to wear traditional clothing in their profession.

Traditional Japanese clothing has garnered fascination in the Western world as a representation of a different culture; first gaining popularity in the 1860s, Japonisme saw traditional clothing – some produced exclusively for export and differing in construction from the clothes worn by Japanese people everyday – exported to the West, where it soon became a popular item of clothing for artists and fashion designers. Fascination for the clothing of Japanese people continued into WW2, where some stereotypes of Japanese culture such as "geisha girls" became widespread. Over time, depictions and interest in traditional and modern Japanese clothing has generated discussions surrounding cultural appropriation and the ways in which clothing can be used to stereotype a culture; in 2016, the "Kimono Wednesday" event held at the Boston Museum of Arts became a key example of this.

== History ==
=== Yayoi period (Neolithic to Iron Age) ===
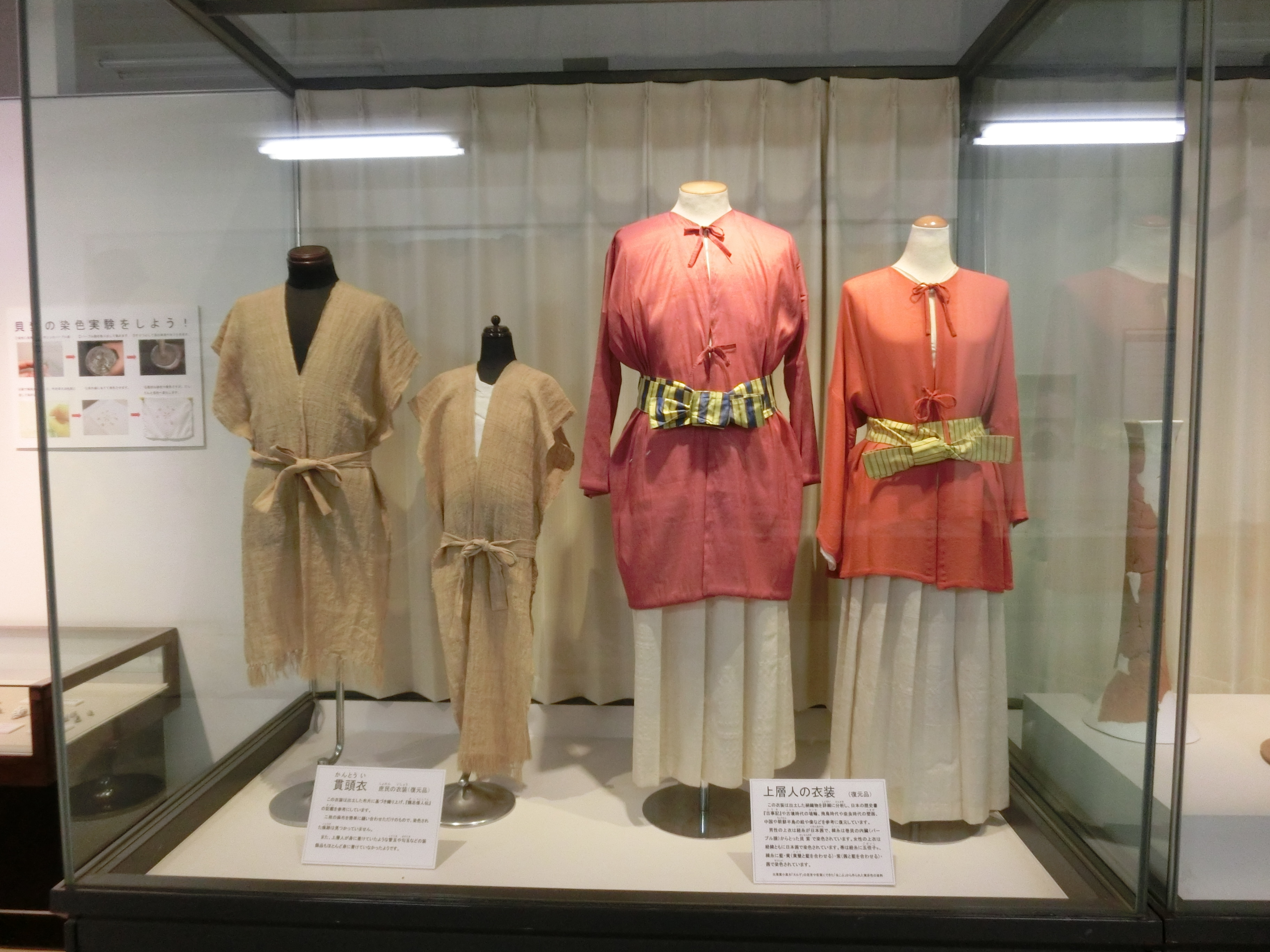
Reconstructed Yayoi clothing

Little is known of the clothing of the Yayoi period. In the 3rd-century Weizhi Worenchuan (魏志倭人伝 (Gishi Wajinden), a section of the Records of the Three Kingdoms compiled by Chinese scholar Chen Shou), there is some description of clothing worn in Japan. It describes broad cloth (possibly double-width), made into unshaped garments by being tied about the waist and shoulders.

=== Kofun period (300–538 AD) ===
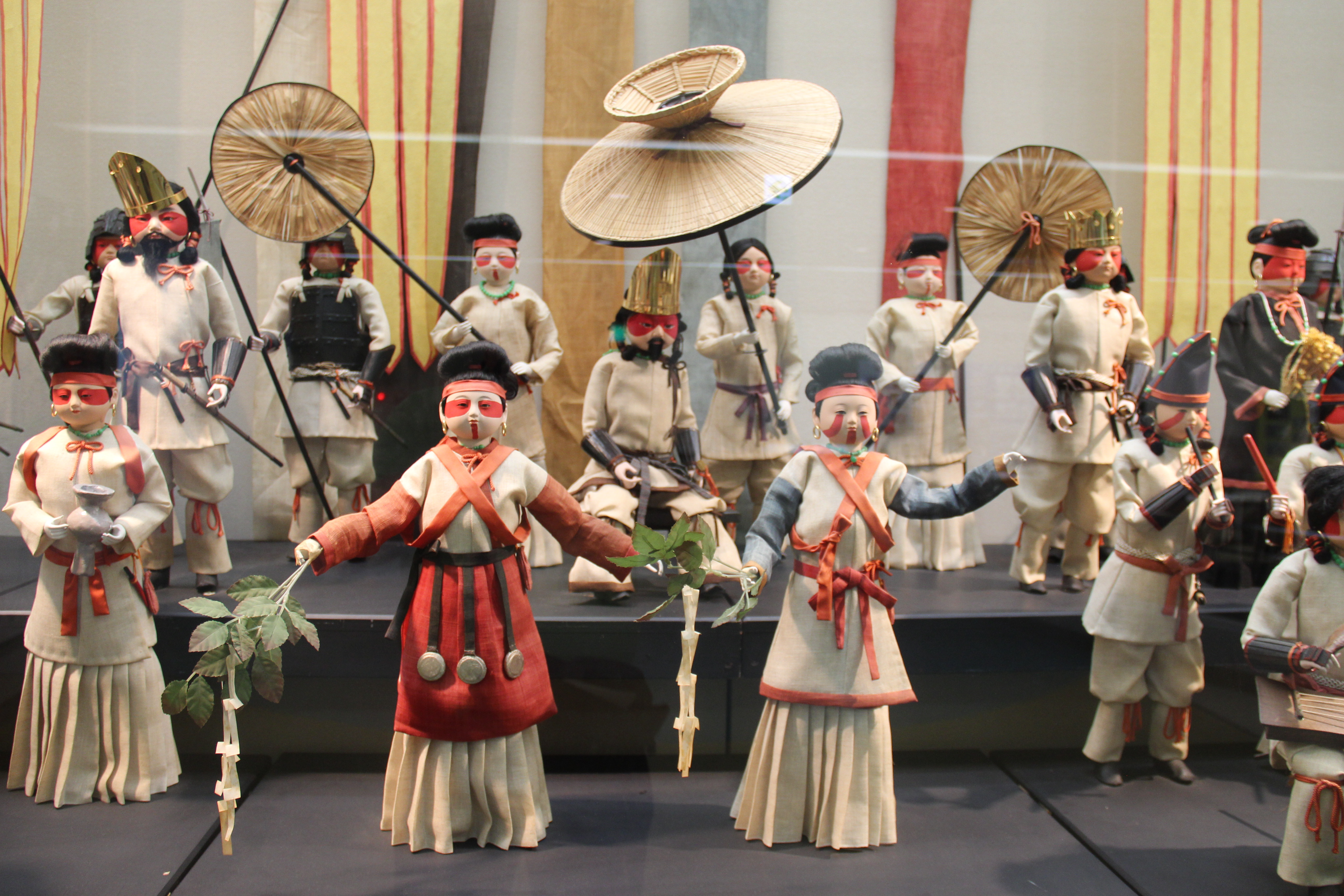
Museum-reconstruction figurines (conducting religious ceremony; note shide)

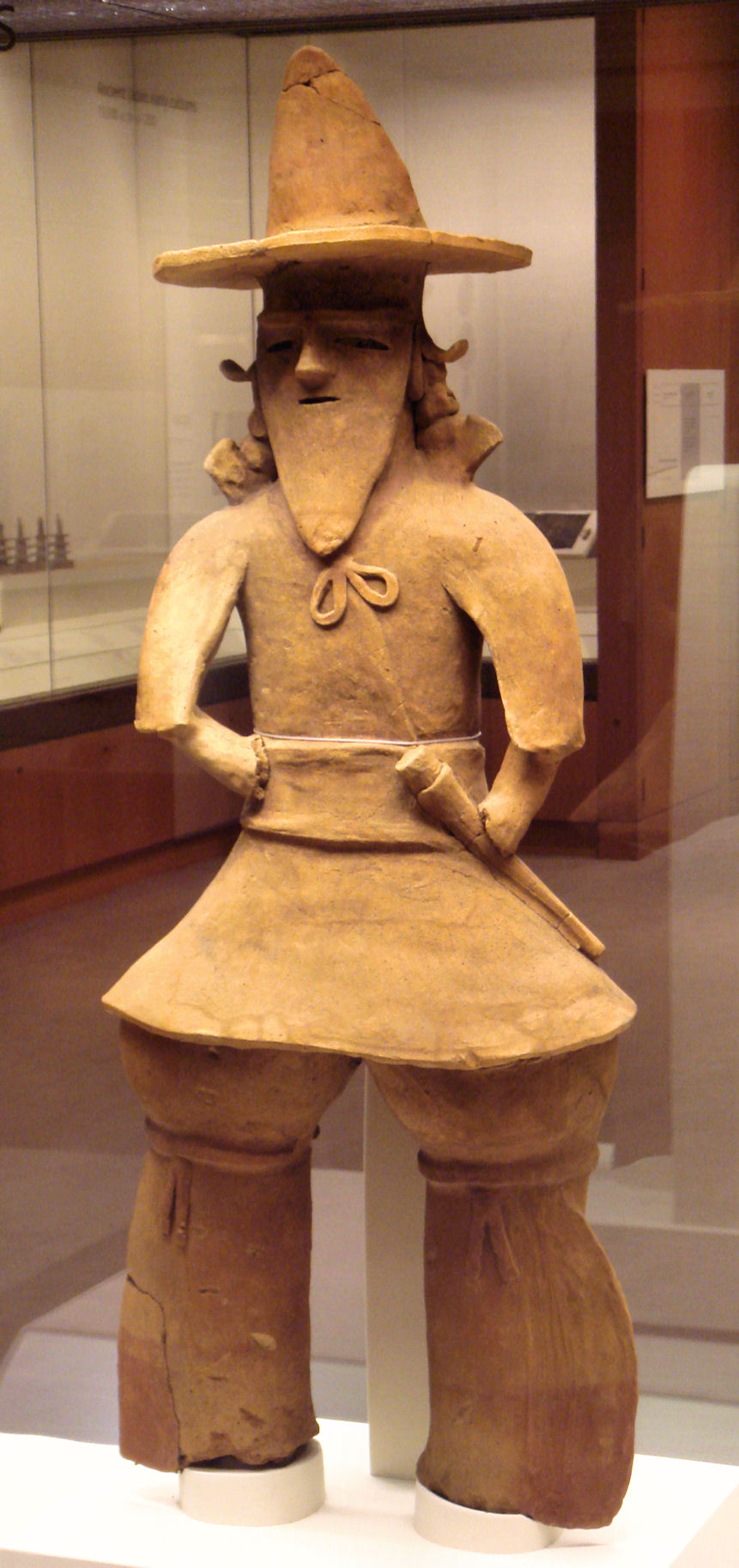
Haniwa figure

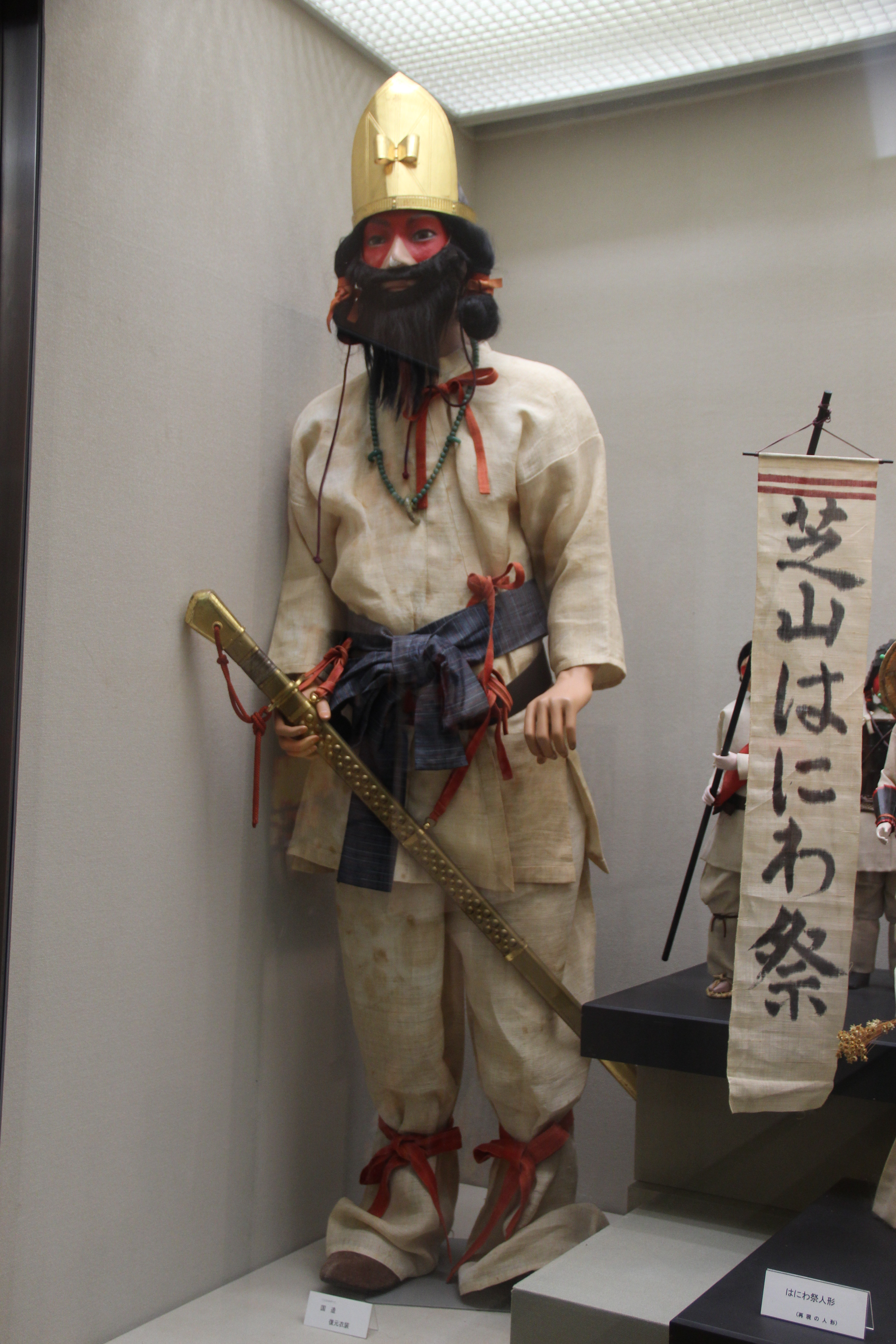
Reconstruction

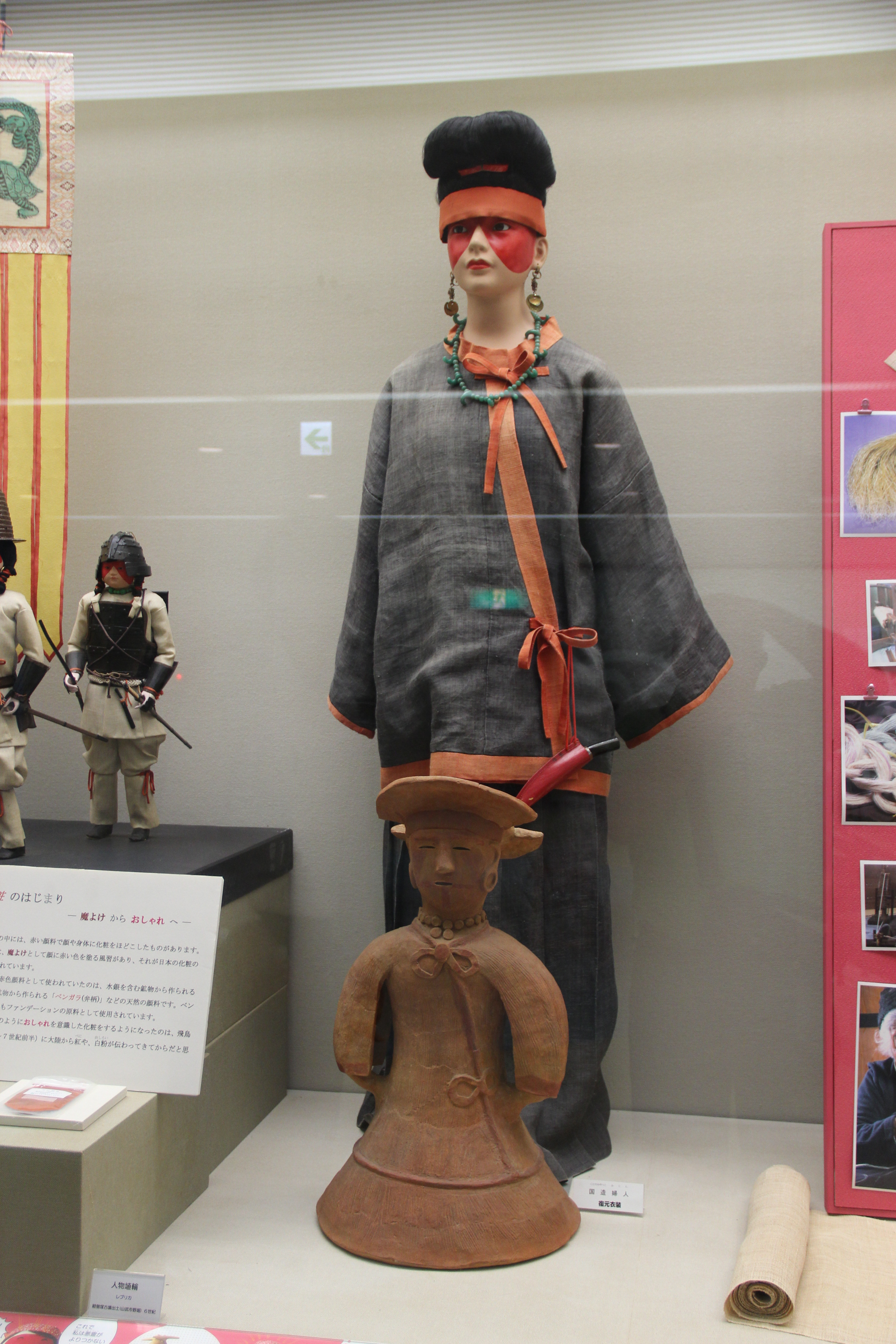
Haniwa figure with reconstruction

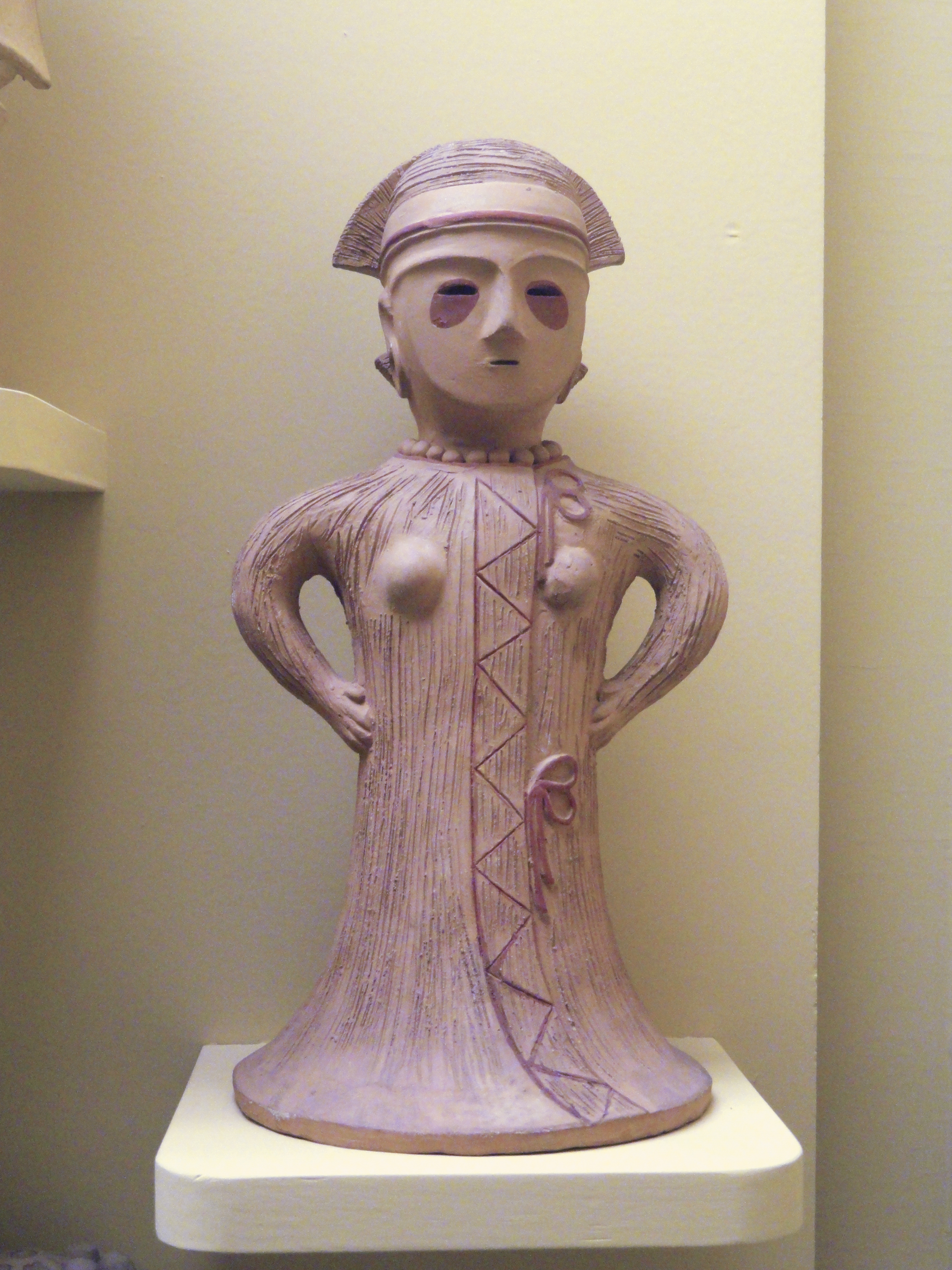
Figure (reconstruction?) from Honshu, decorated with red pigment

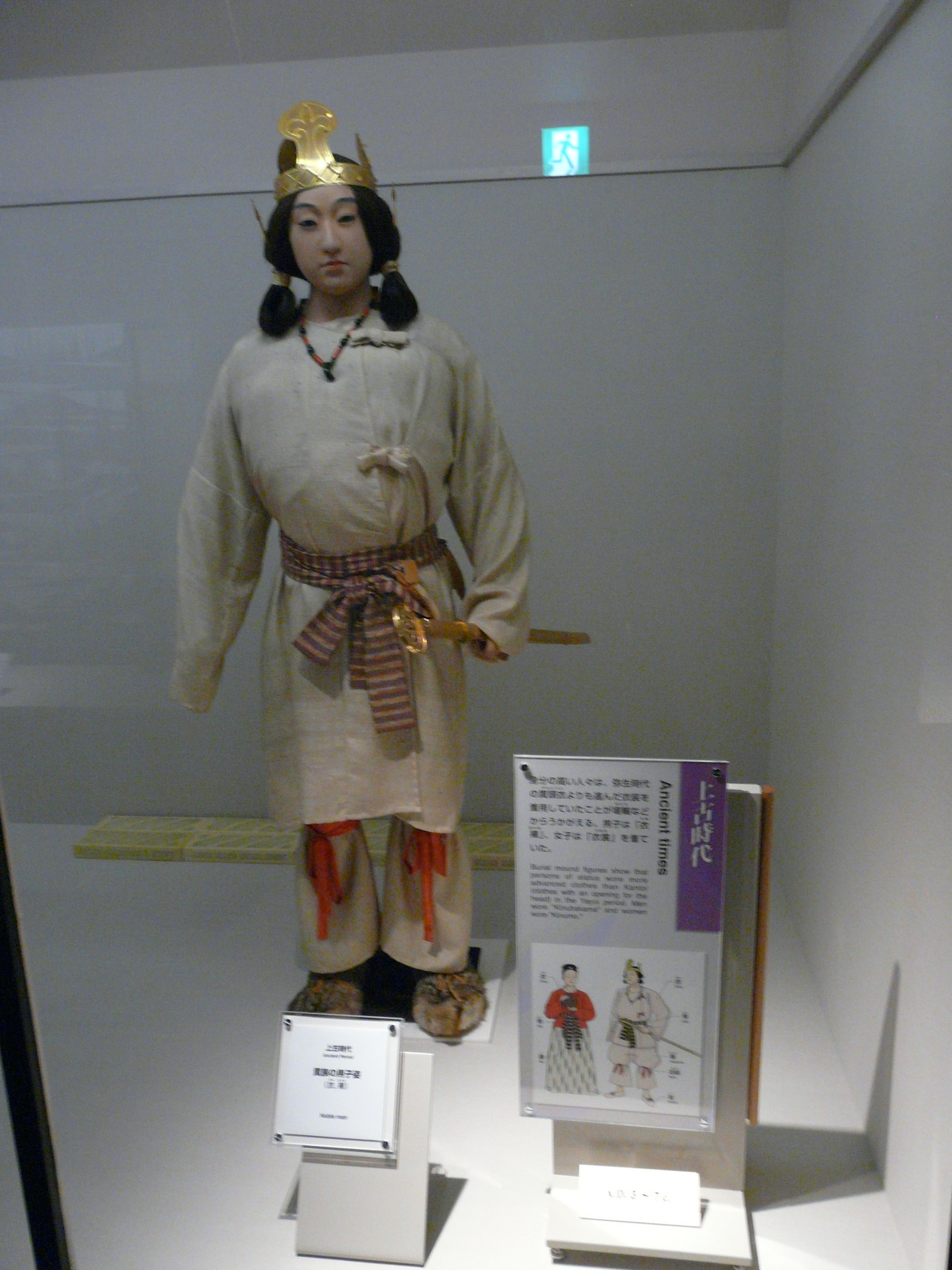

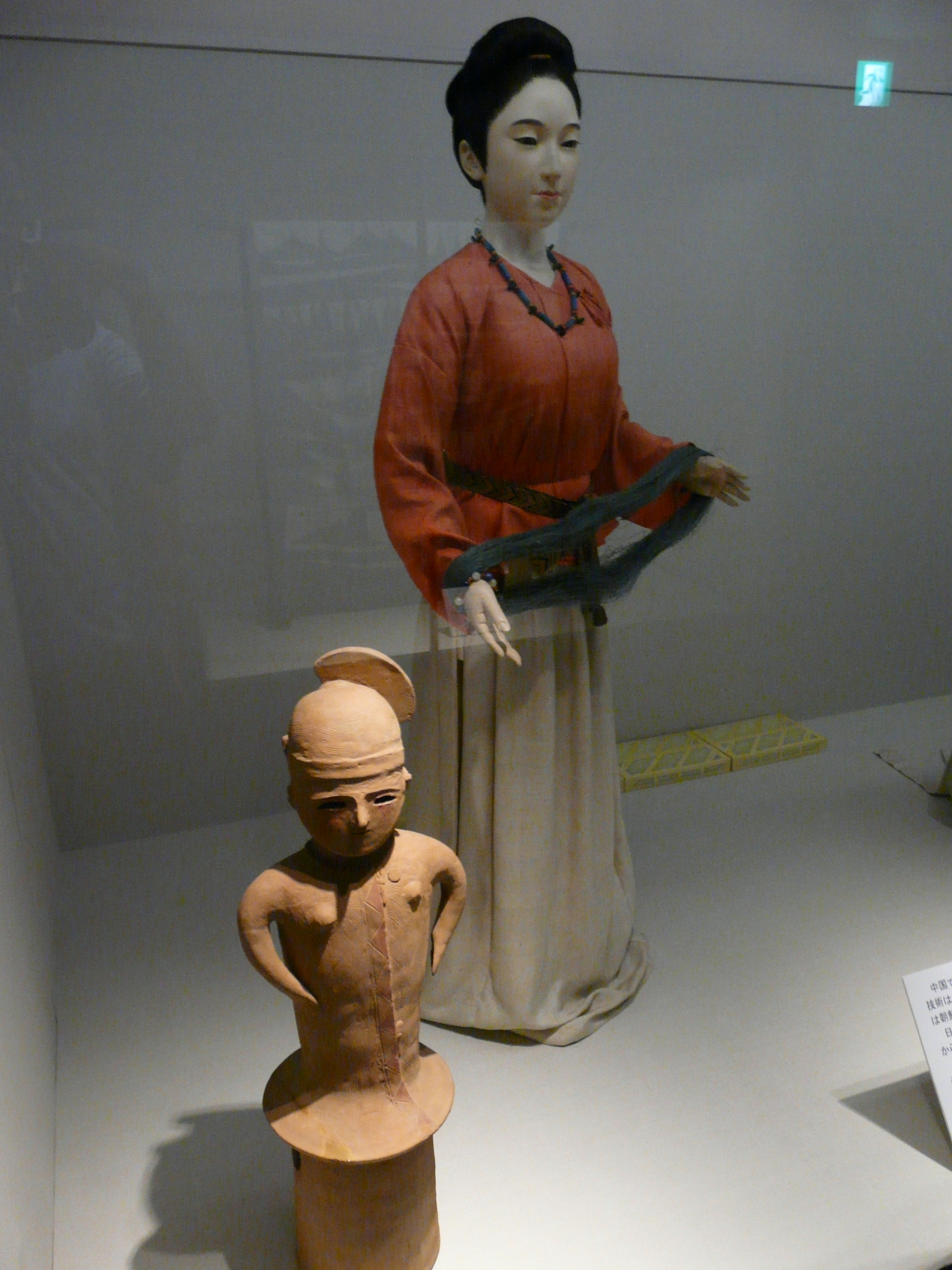
Haniwa figure with reconstruction

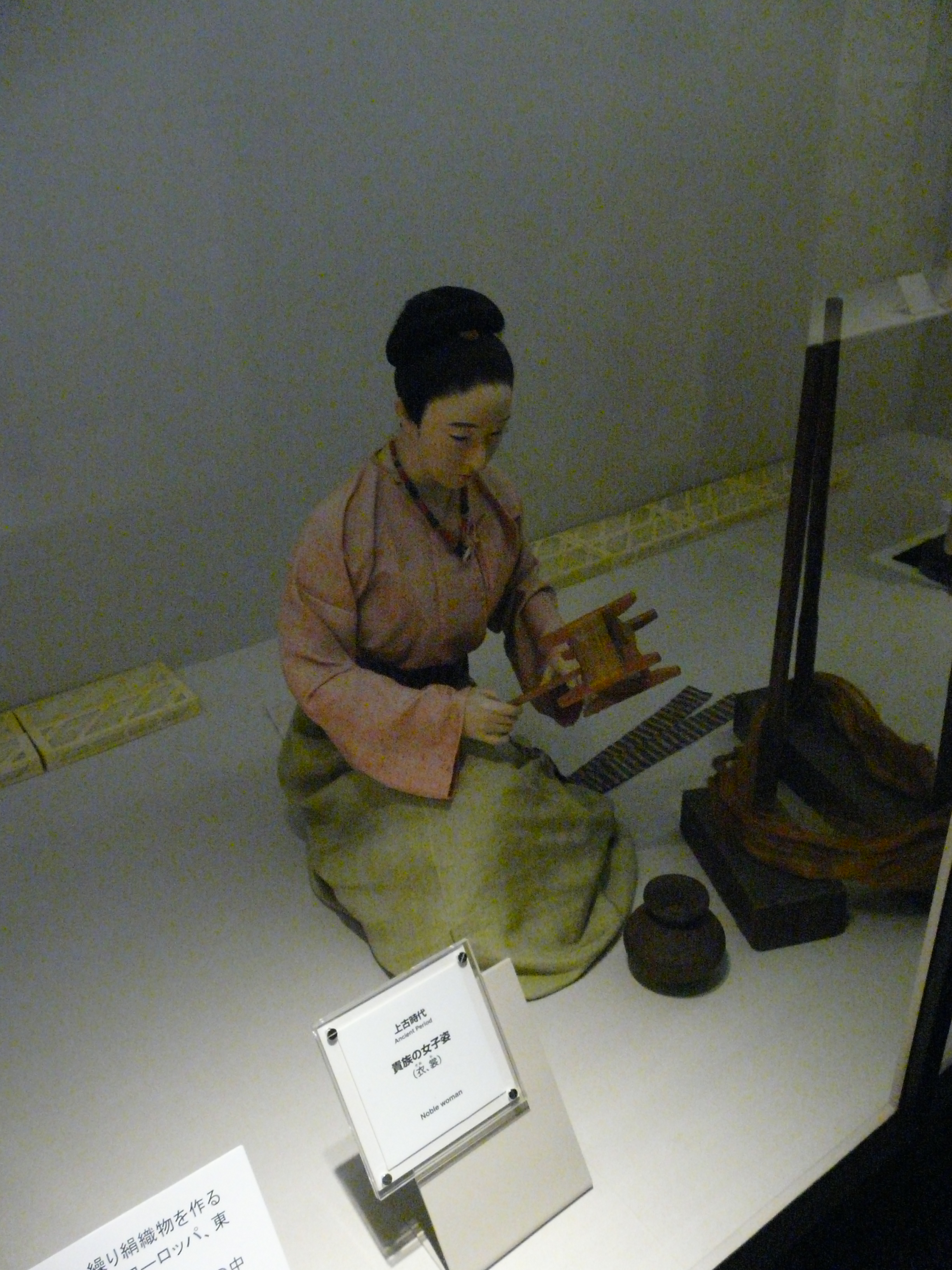

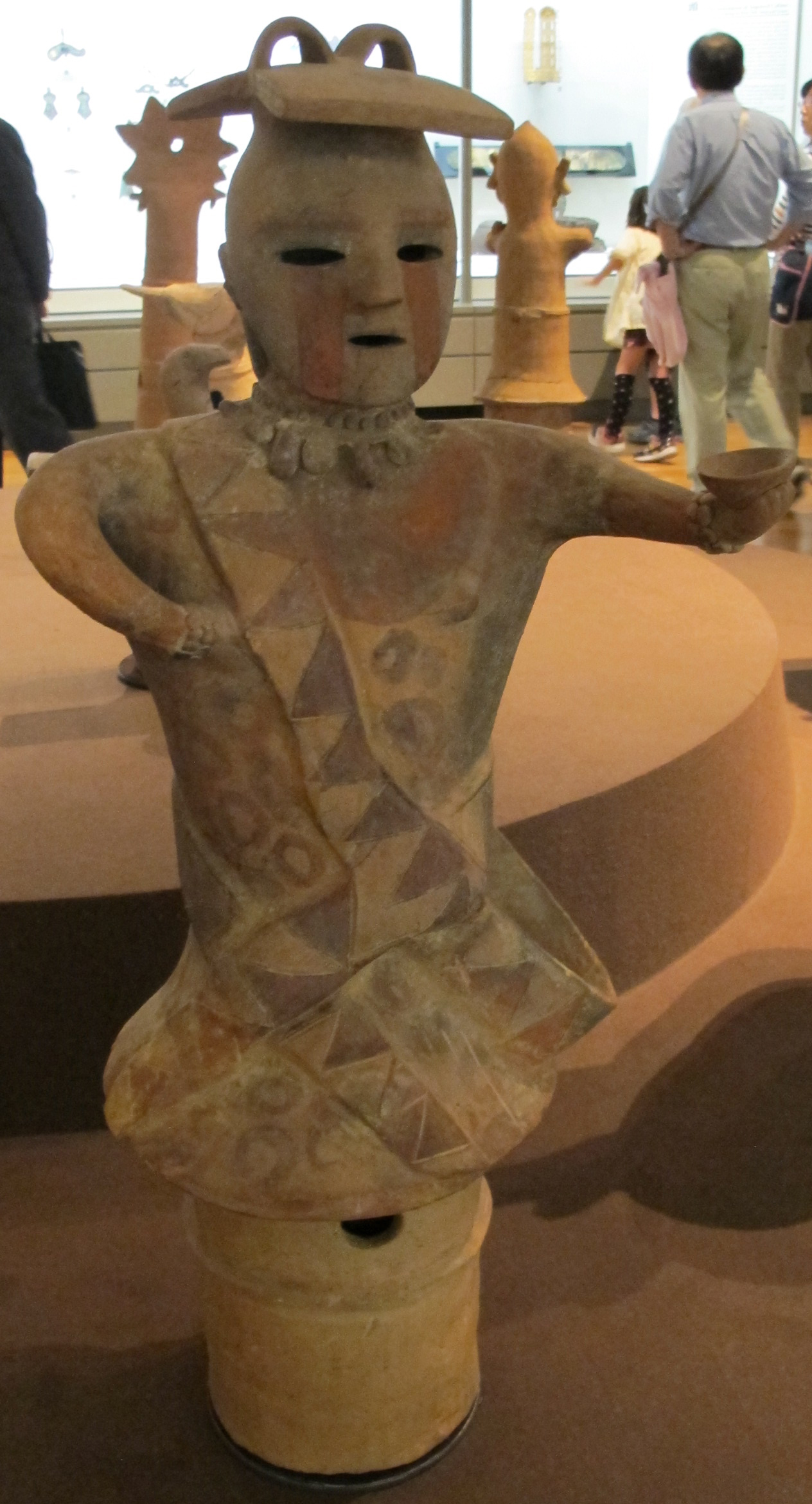
6th-century figure

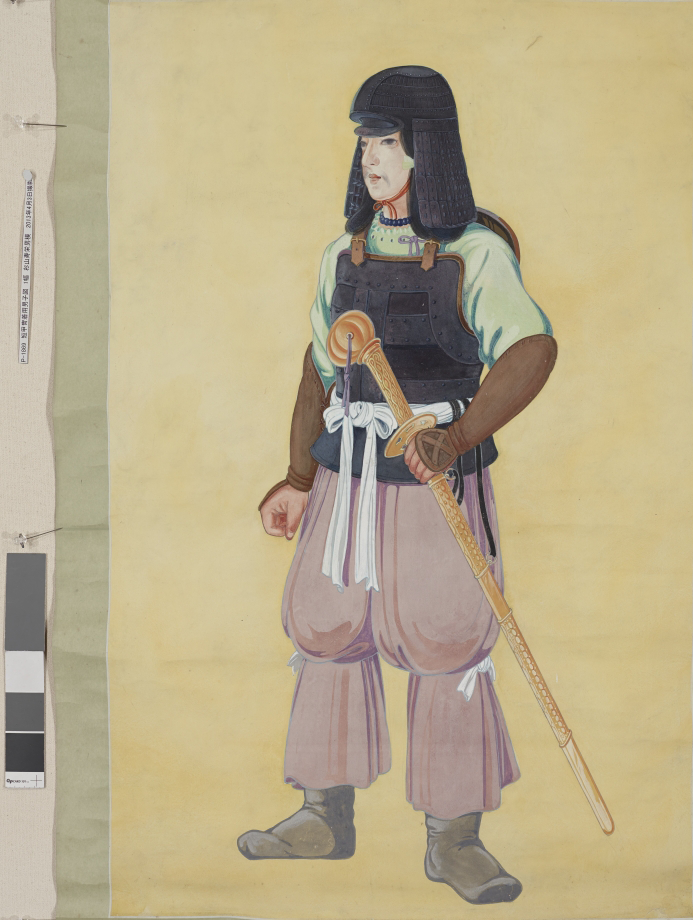
Tanko armour

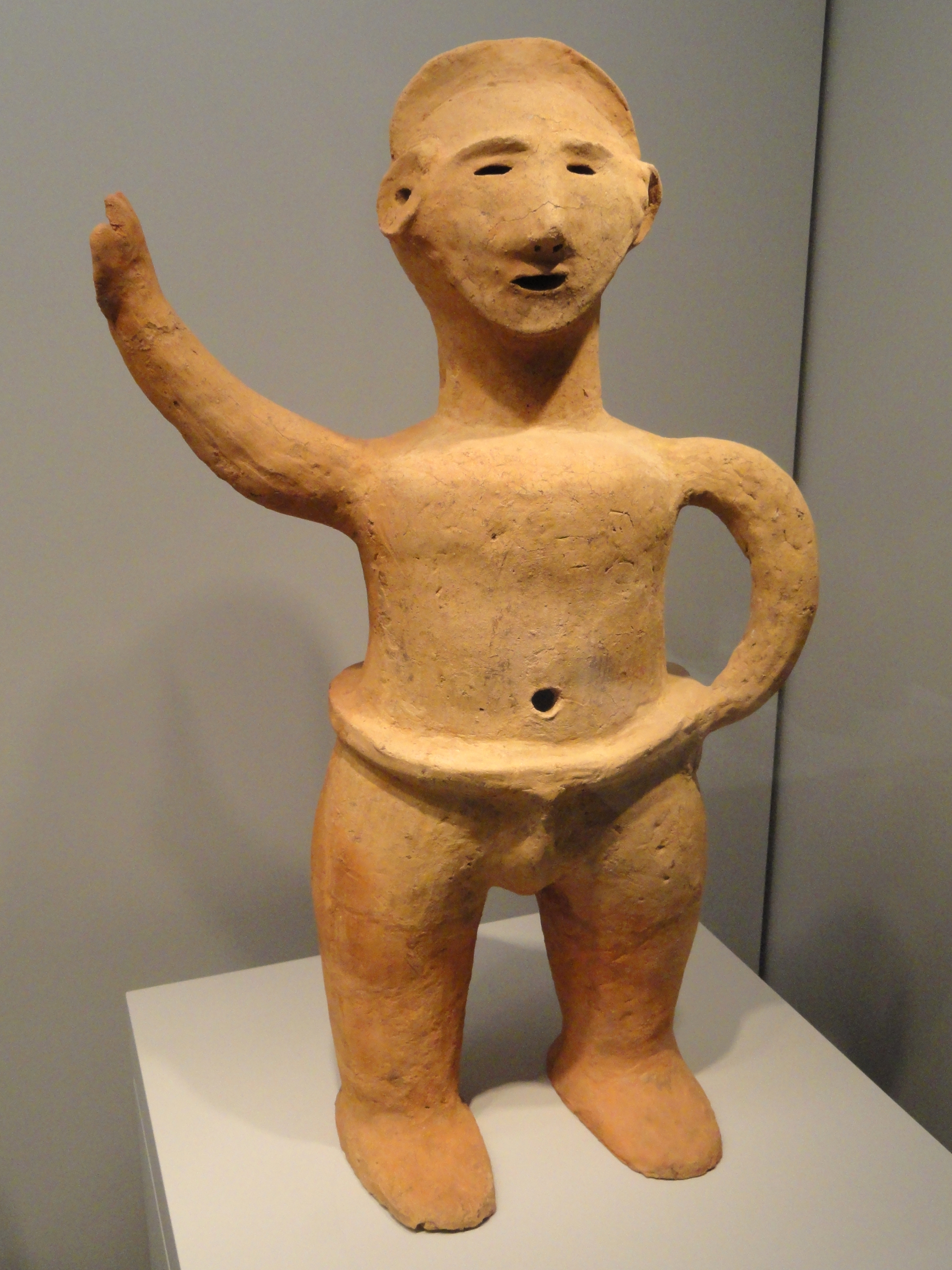
Figure in a loincloth

Until the 5th century AD, there is little artistic evidence of the clothing worn in Japan. Kofun period clothing is known from clay sculptures used atop haniwa offering cylinders. These were used in the 5th and 6th century, though most haniwa have no sculpture on top. These figures likely do not represent everyday dress; they may represent riding dress. Many wear armour.

In the Kofun period, the right side was wrapped over the left (unlike in China), and the overlapped edge was secured with ties on the right side. Sleeves and trousers were tubular. Female figures often wear a skirt, with male figures wearing trousers tied with garters just above the calf, so that they balloon over the knee, allowing freedom of movement. Mo, wrapped skirts, were worn by men and women, sometimes over hakama (trousers).

Traditional Chinese clothing had been introduced to Japan via Chinese envoys in the Kofun period, with immigration between the two countries and envoys to the Tang dynasty court leading to Chinese styles of dress, appearance and culture becoming extremely popular in Japanese court society. The Imperial Japanese court quickly adopted Chinese styles of dress and clothing. As early as the 4th century CE, images of priestess-queens and tribal chiefs in Japan depicted figures wearing clothing similar that of Han dynasty China. There is evidence of the oldest samples of shibori tie-dyed fabric stored at the Shōsōin Temple being Chinese in origin, due to the limitations of Japan's ability to produce the fabrics at the time (see tanmono).

=== Asuka period (538–710 CE) ===
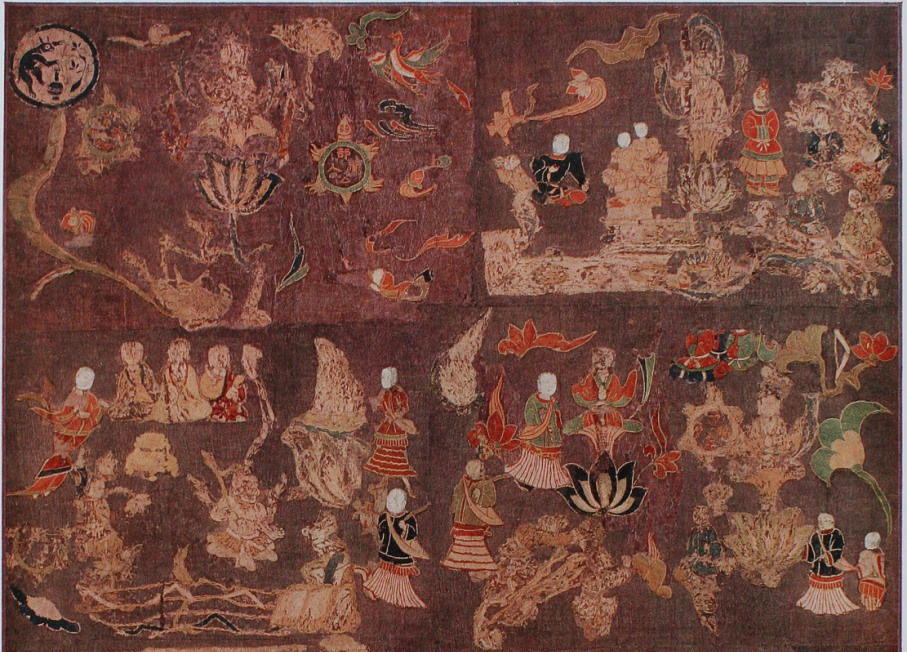
Part of the Tenjukoku Shūchō Mandala, an embroidery from the reign of Empress Suiko (593–628)

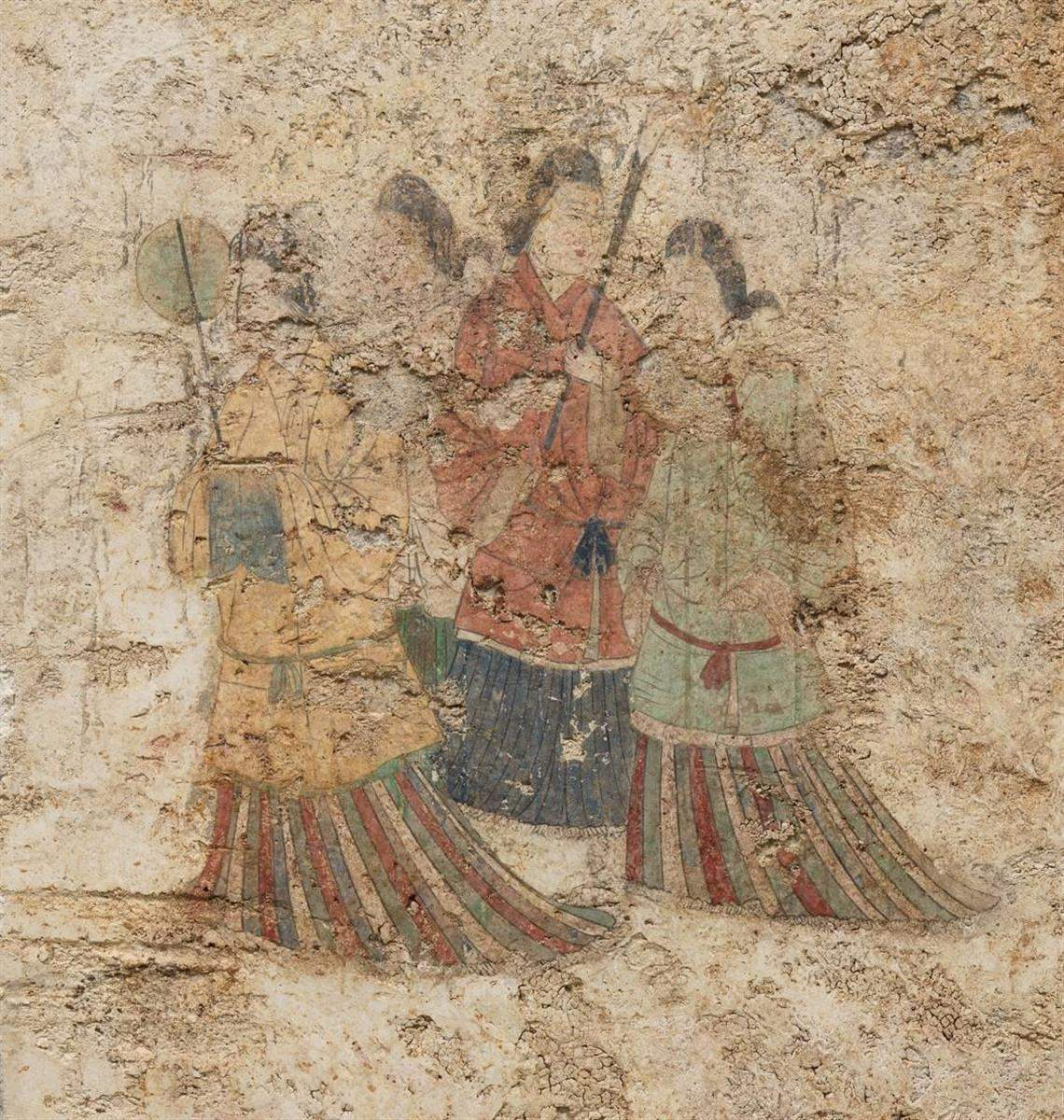
Women's dress under Goguryeo influence, with overlapping collar and mo skirt. (Takamatsuzuka Tomb, 7th century)

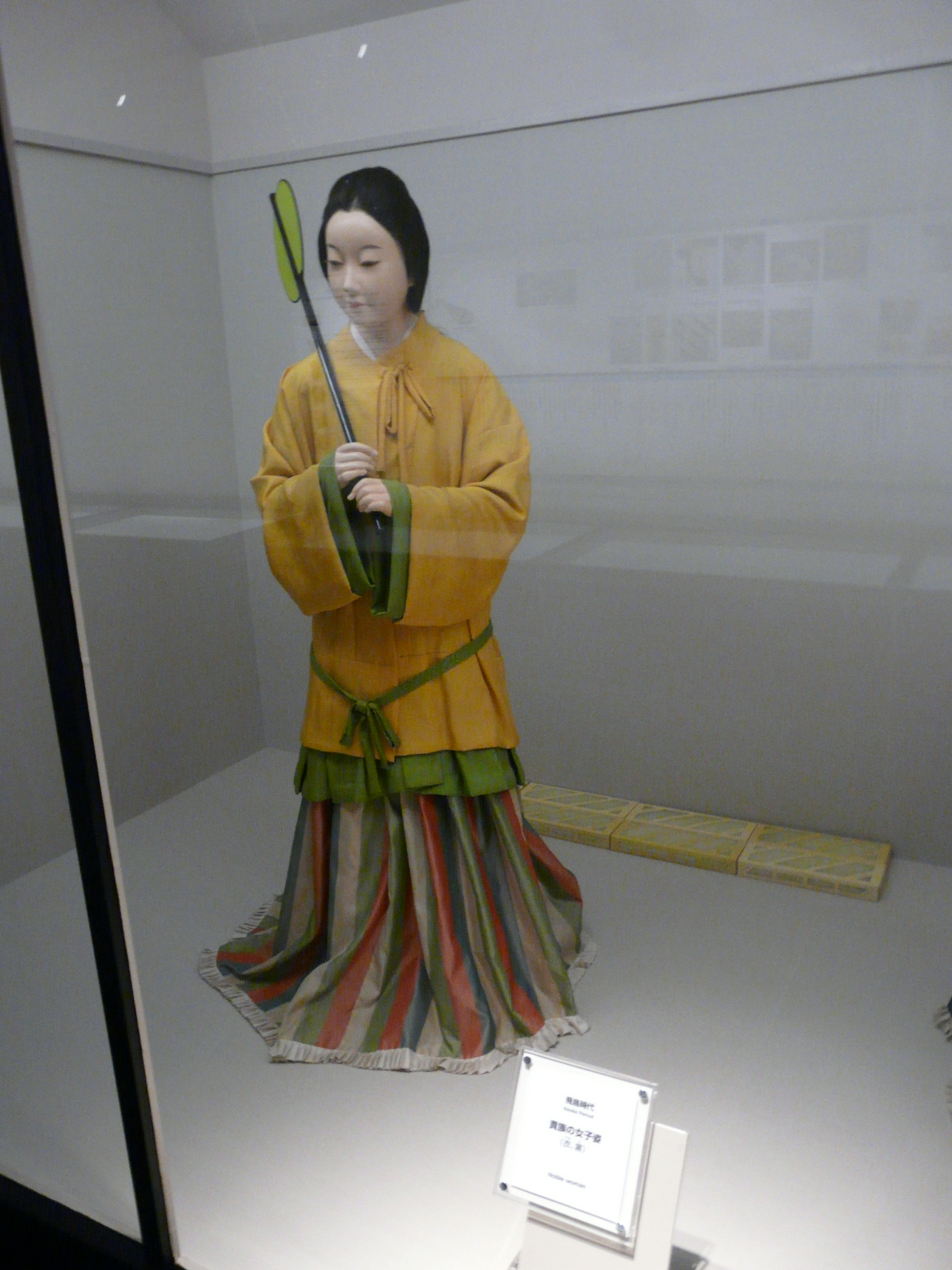
Replica of the dress of the leftmost figure in the preceding picture; mo with stripes and frill

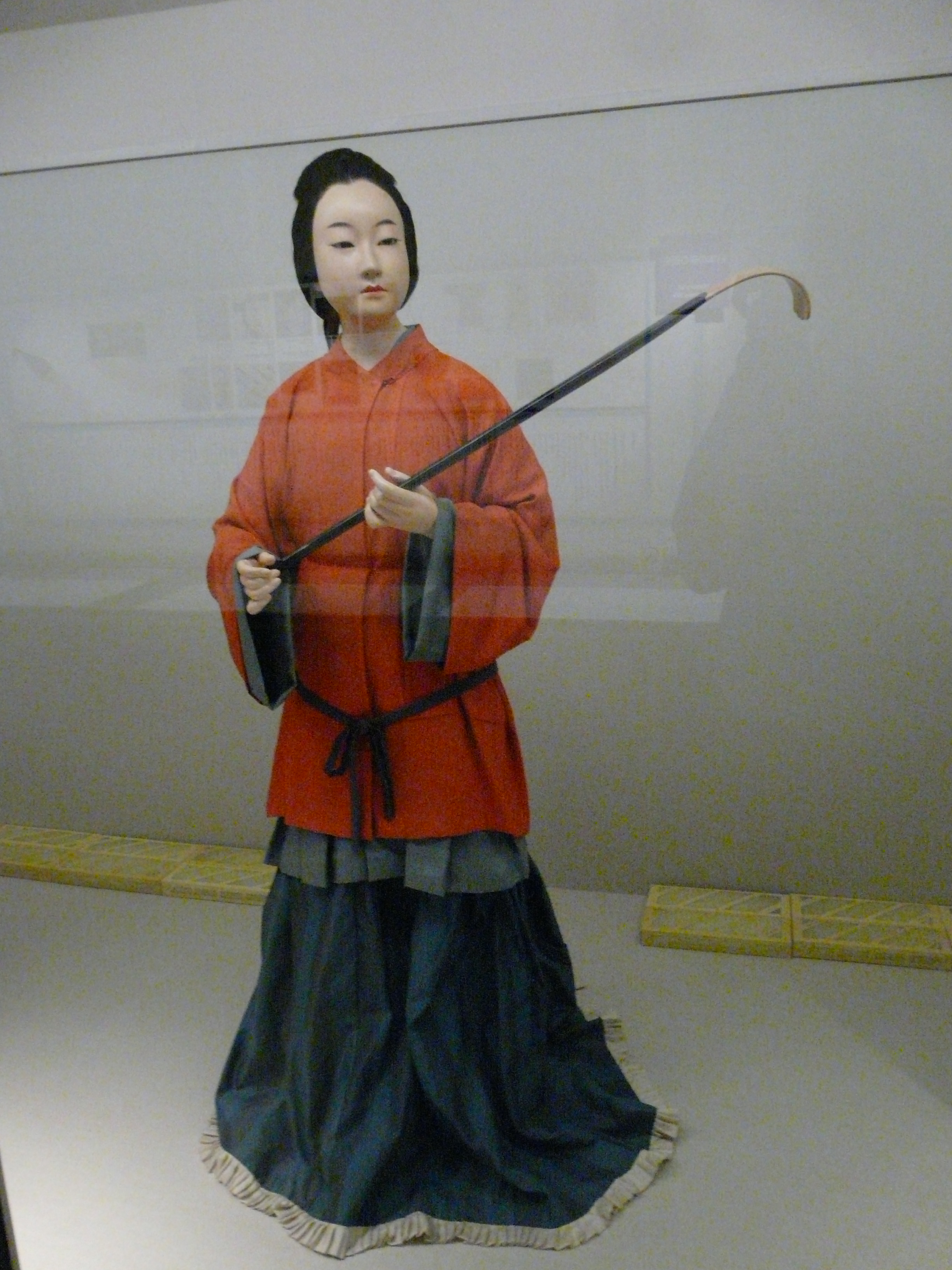
Replica of the dress of the center-right figure in the preceding picture

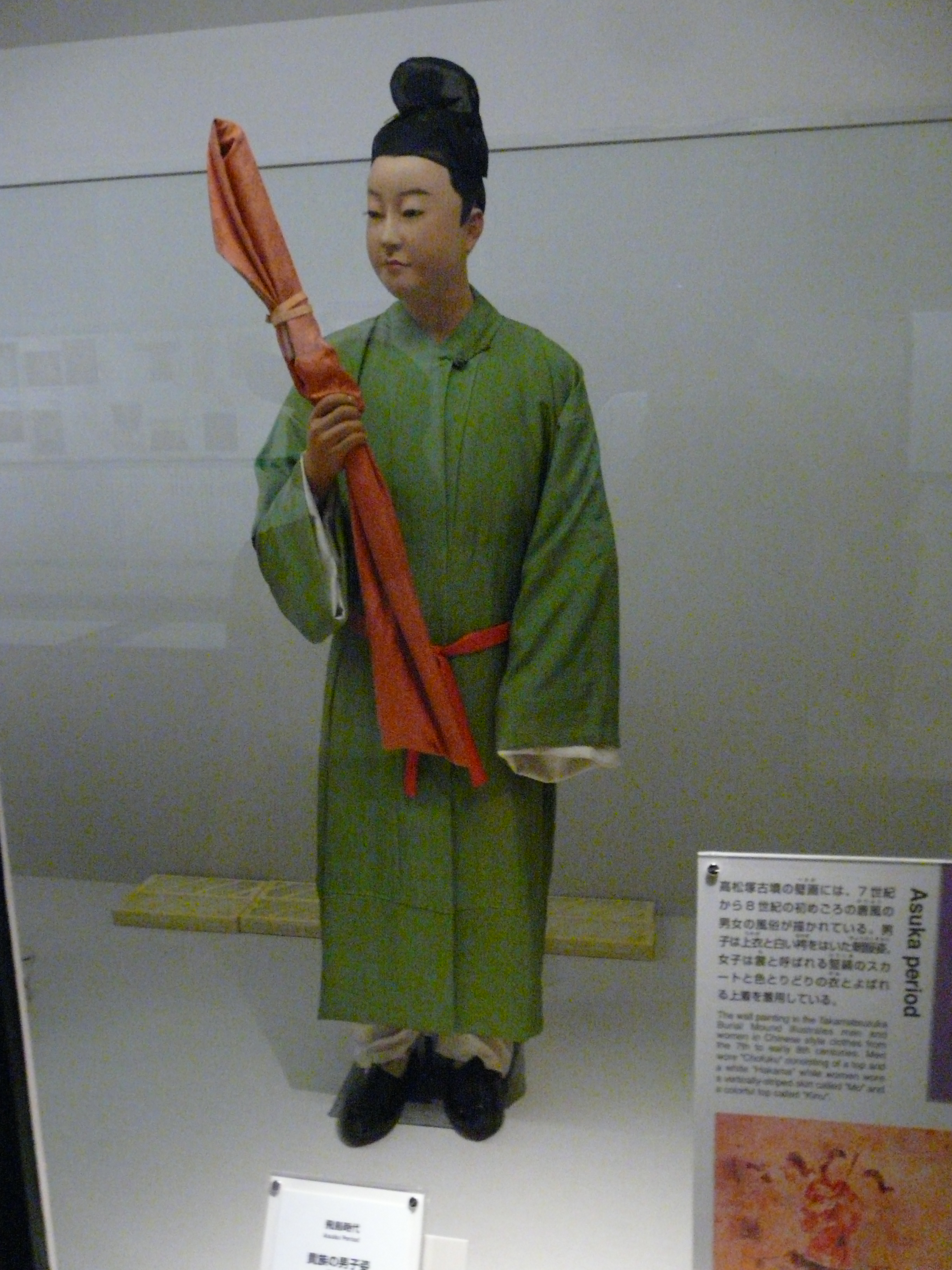
Contemporary men's dress, with green hō, white hakama, and kanmuri cap. This reconstruction is probably outdated; the hō should be shorter, with a short pleated frill beneath, as in the women's costume.

The Asuka period began with the introduction of Buddhism, and the writing system of Chinese characters to Japan; during this time, Chinese influence over Japan was fairly strong.

Judging by the depictions in the Tenjukoku Shūchō Mandala, during the reign of Empress Suiko (593–628), male and female court dress were very similar. Both wore round-necked front-fastening hō with non-overlapping lapels, the front, collar, and cuffs edged with contrasting fabric, possibly an underlayer; the ran skirt, above knee-length, had a matching edge. Below the ran and extending below it to about knee length, a more heavily pleated contrasting skirt called a hirami was worn. Below the hirami, men wore narrow hakama with a contrasting lower edge, and women wore a pleated mo long enough to trail.

The Takamatsuzuka Tomb (c. 686 CE) (Note: (around the end of Emperor Tenmu's reign and the beginning of Empress Jitō's reign; the usual date for the transition is 686 CE).) is a major source of information for upper-class clothing of this period. By this time, the hō lapels overlapped (still right side over left), and the hō and mo were edged with pleated frills, replacing the hirami. Kanmuri (black gauze caps stiffened with lacquer) were being worn by male courtiers, and were regulated in the 11th regnal year of Emperor Tenmu (~684 CE); this fashion persists in formal use into the 21st century.

=== Nara period (710–794) ===
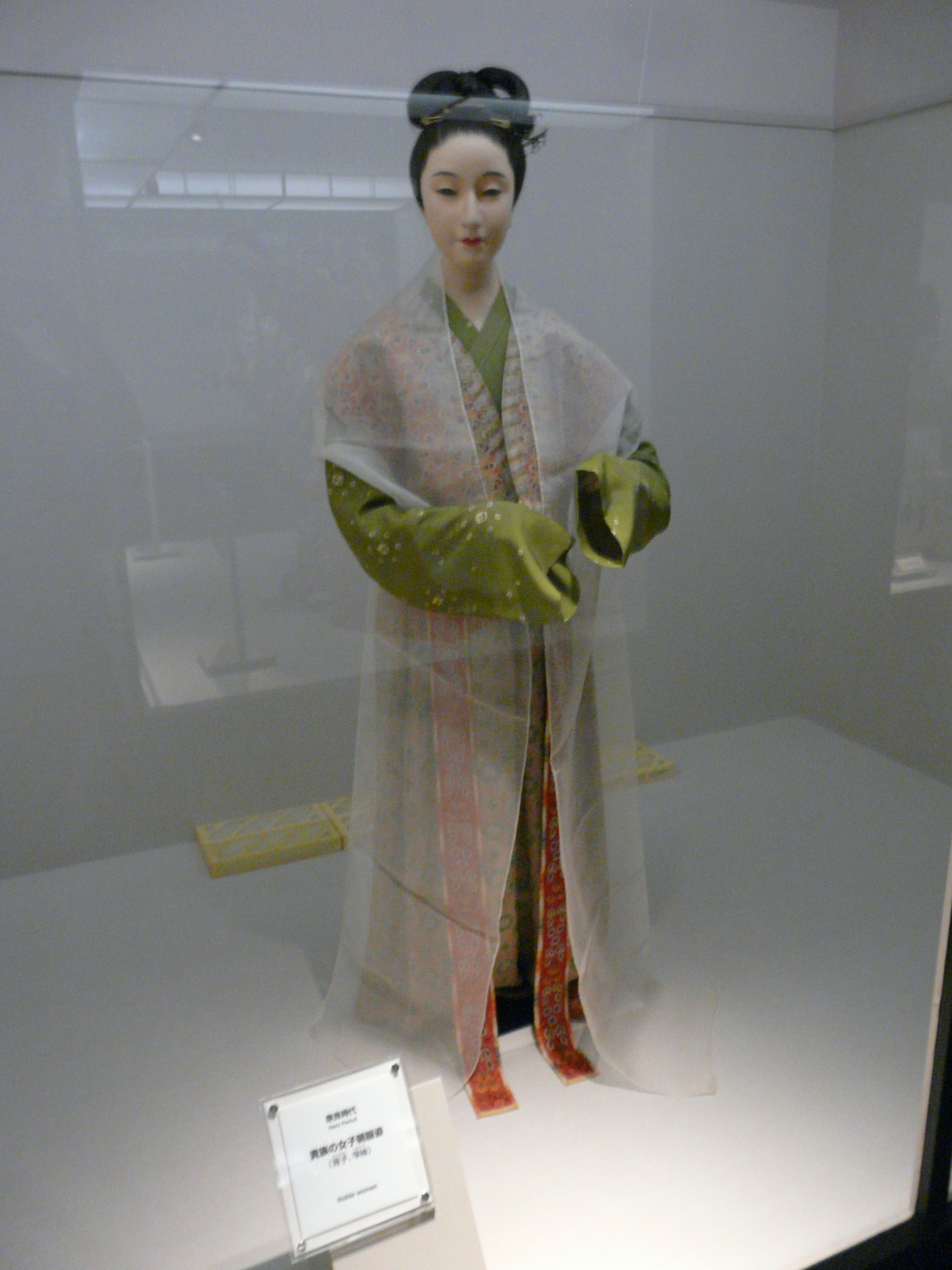
Women's dress, with overvest, overskirt, waist sash, and stole

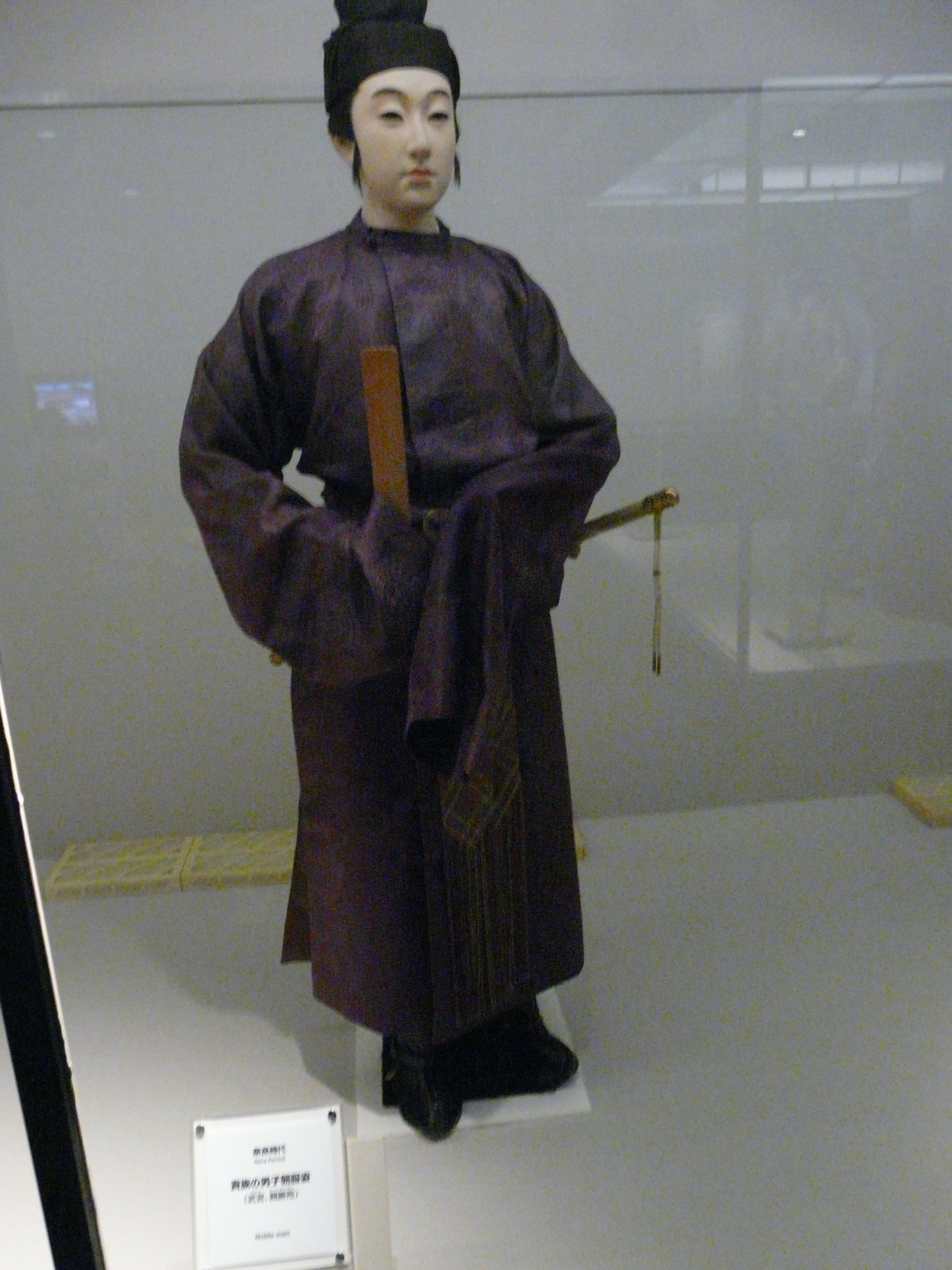
Men's dress, with kanmuri hat, hakama, ornate sash, shaku and sword

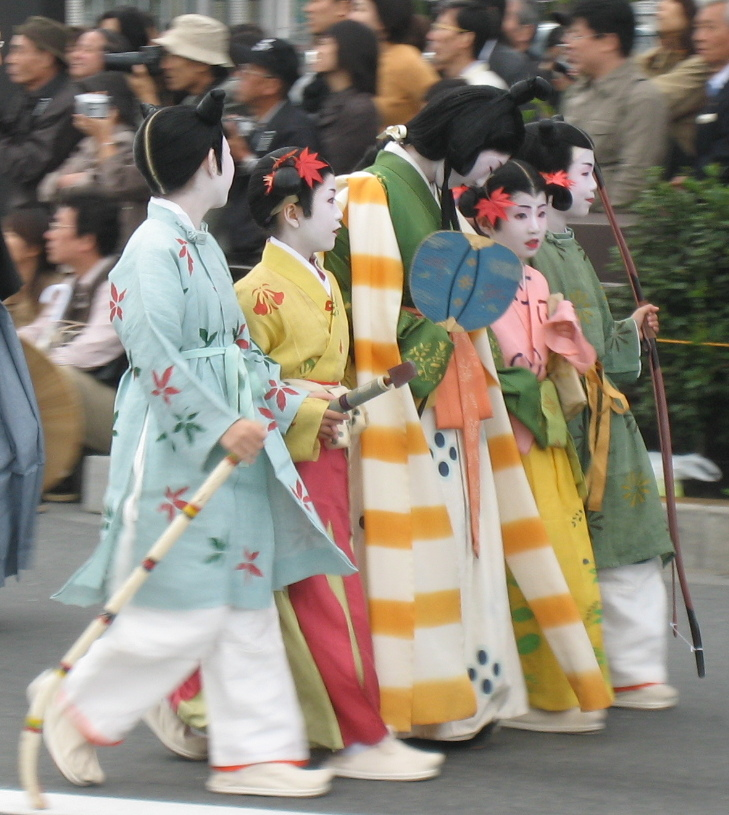
Children's dress, late 8th century, 2005 reconstruction

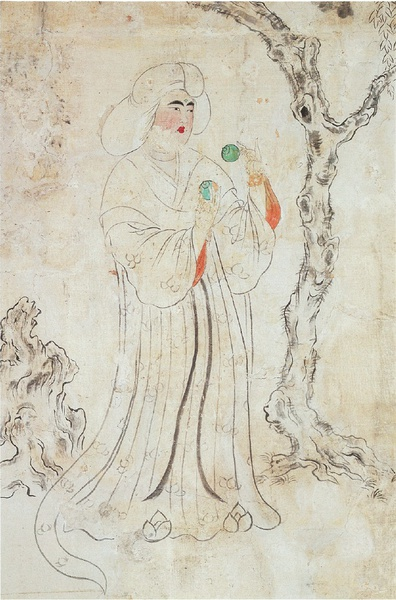
In contemporary art

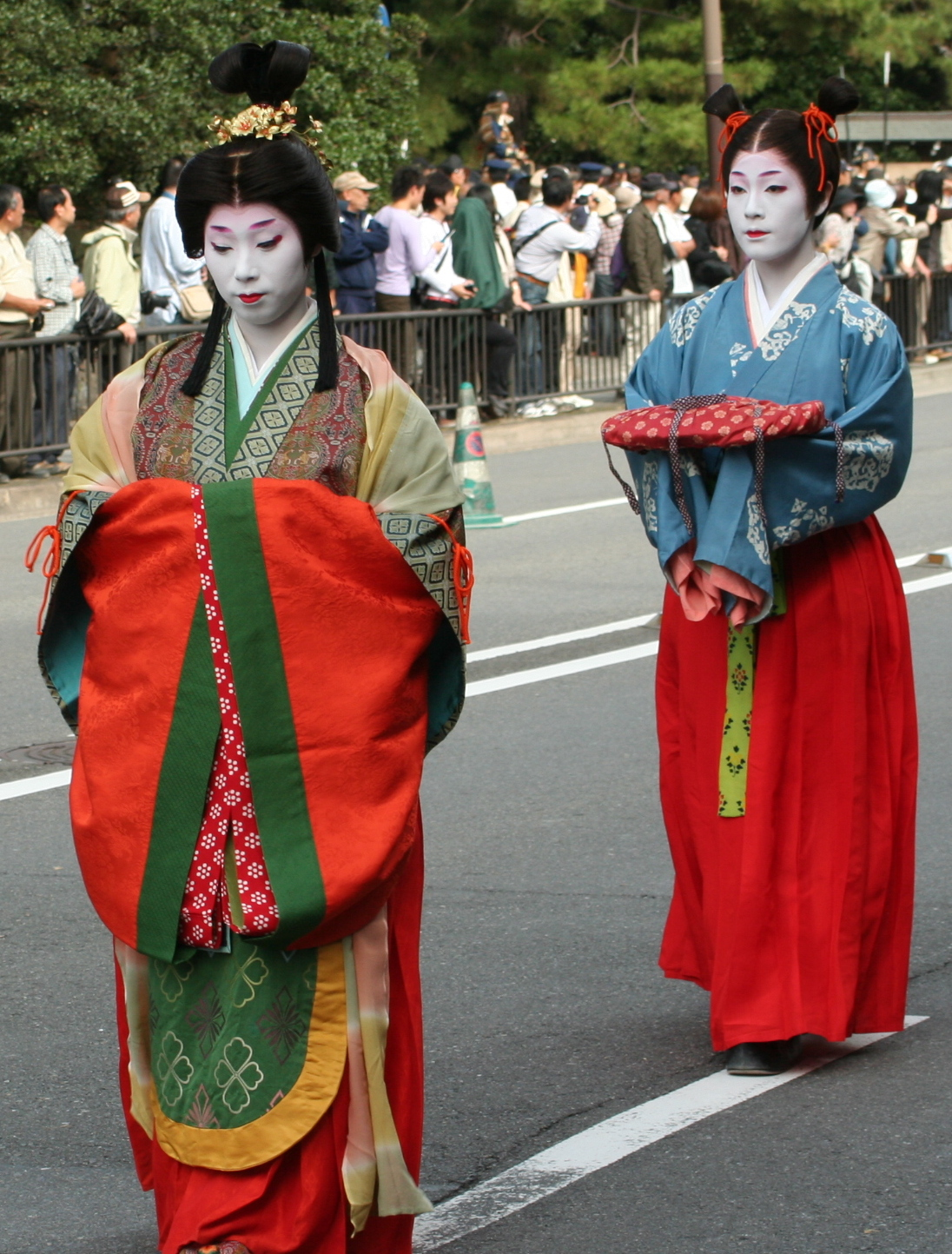
Nara court dress with stole, apron and overvest, 2009 reconstruction
More pictures
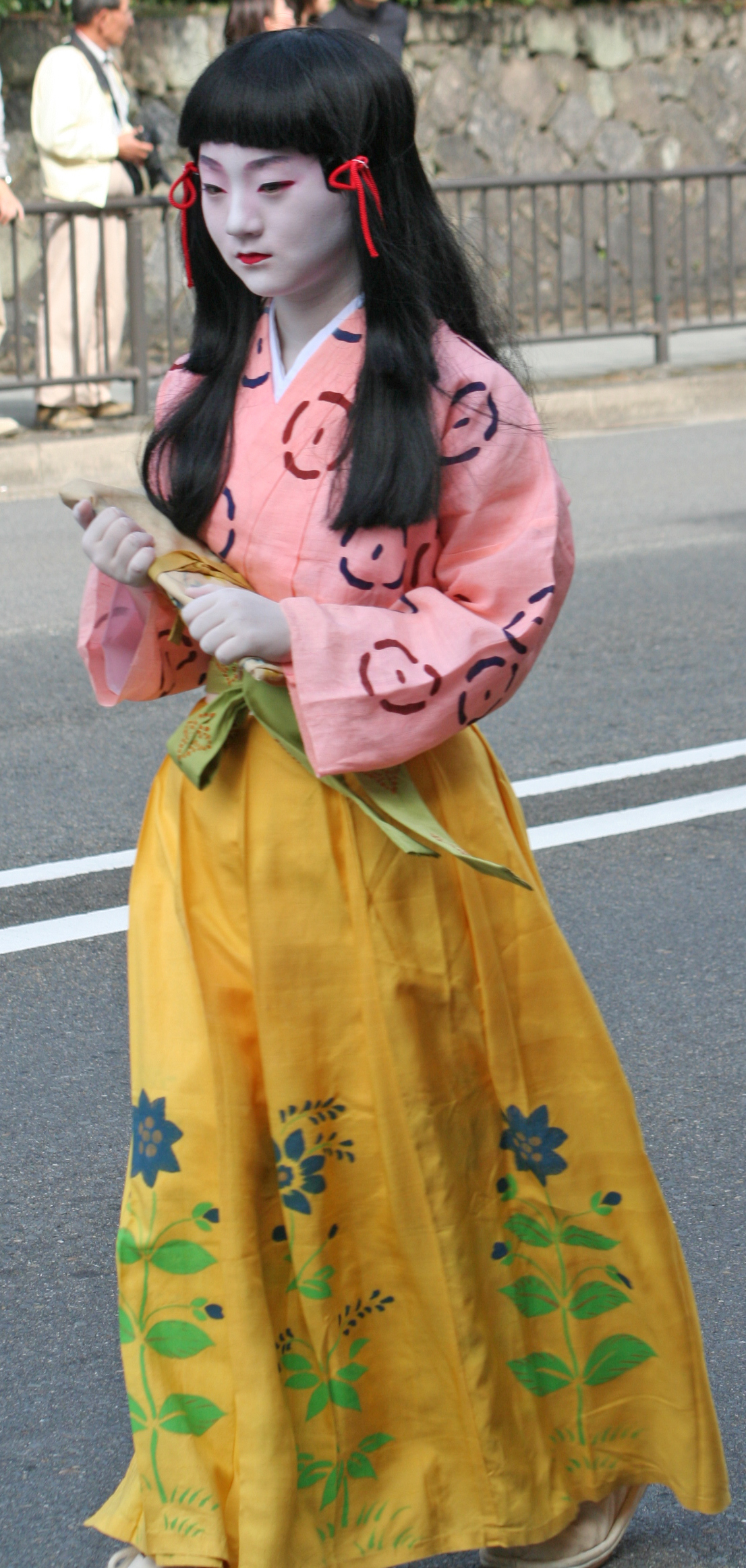
Tarikubi collar, and lower garments outermost

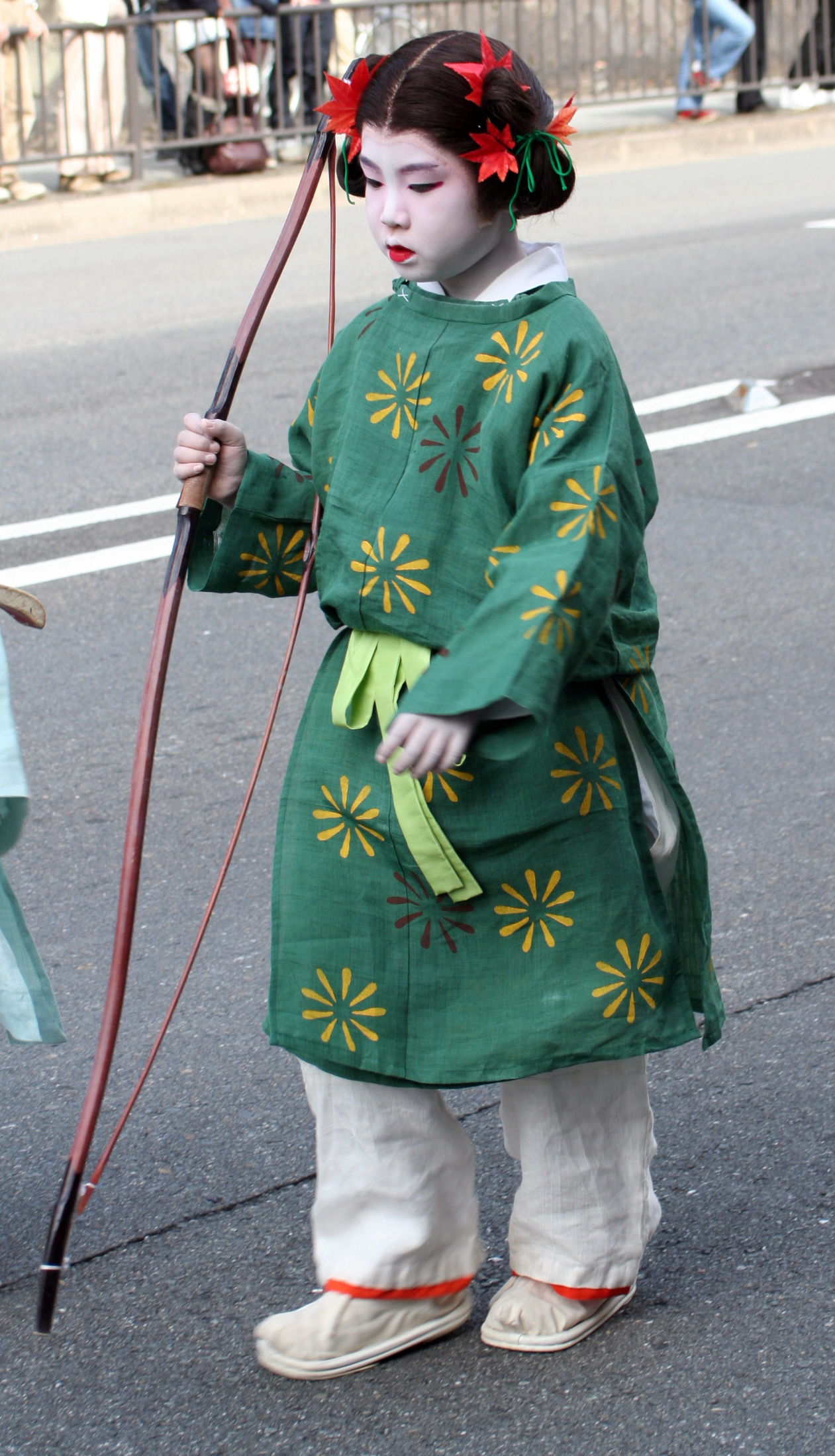
Agekubi outer collar, with upper garments outermost

Nara-period upper-class clothing was much simpler than some later styles, taking no more than a few minutes to don, with the clothing itself allowing for freedom of movement. Women's upper-class dress consisted of a left-over-right lap-fronted top (over a similar underrobe), and a wrapped, pleated skirt (mo). Women also sometimes wore a lap-fronted overvest, and a narrow rectangular stole. Men's upper-class dress had narrow, unpleated (single-panel) hakama (trousers) under a loose, mandarin-collared coat (hō (袍)), with elaborate hats of stiffened open-weave black cloth (kanmuri). Clothing was belted with narrow sashes.

Nara-period women's clothing was heavily influenced by Tang-dynasty China. Women adopted tarikubi (垂領, "drape-necked") collars, which overlapped like modern kimono collars, though men continued wearing round agekubi (上領, "high-necked") mandarin collars, which were associated with scholasticism, only later adopting tarikubi. Lower-body garments (mo and hakama) had been worn under the outermost upper-body garments, but now, following the newer Chinese fashion, they transitioned to being worn on top (again, by women, but not yet by men).

In 718 CE, the Yoro clothing code was instituted, which stipulated that all robes had to be overlapped at the front with a left-to-right closure, following typical Chinese fashions. China considered right-over-left wraps barbaric. This convention of wear is still followed today, with a right-to-left closure worn only by the deceased.

In 752 CE, a massive bronze Buddha statue at Tōdai-ji, Nara, was consecrated with great ceremony. The ceremonial clothing of attendees (probably not all made in Japan) was preserved in the Shōsō-in. Most of them close left-over-right, but some abut or overlap right-over-left. Collar shapes include narrow, round or v-shaped. There is craftsmen's clothing in asa (domestic bast fiber), with long, round-collared outer robes. Richer garments in silk are ornamented with figural and geometric patterns, woven and dyed; some have flaring sleeves. Aprons, hakama, leggings, socks and shoes have also been preserved.

Social segregation of clothing was primarily noticeable in the Nara period (710–794), through the division of upper and lower class. People of higher social status wore clothing that covered the majority of their body, or as Svitlana Rybalko states, "the higher the status, the less was open to other people's eyes". For example, the full-length robes would cover most from the collarbone to the feet, the sleeves were to be long enough to hide their fingertips, and women carried fans to protect them from speculative looks.

=== Heian period (794–1185) ===
During the Heian period (794-1185 CE), Japan stopped sending envoys to the dynastic courts. This prevented Chinese-imported goods—including clothing—from entering the Imperial Palace and disseminating to the upper classes, who were the main arbiters of traditional Japanese culture at the time and the only people allowed to wear such clothing. The ensuing cultural vacuum facilitated the development of a Japanese culture independent from Chinese fashions. Elements previously lifted from the Tang Dynastic courts developed independently into what is known literally as "national culture" or "kokufū culture" (国風文化, kokufū-bunka), the term used to refer to Heian-period Japanese culture, particularly that of the upper classes.

Clothing became increasingly stylised, with some elements—such as the round-necked and tube-sleeved chun ju jacket, worn by both genders in the early 7th century—being abandoned by both male and female courtiers. Others, such as the wrapped-front robes, also worn by men and women, were kept. Some elements, such as the mo skirt worn by women, continued on in a reduced capacity, worn only to formal occasions; the mō (裳) grew too narrow to wrap all the way around and became a trapezoidal pleated train. Formal hakama (trousers) became longer than the legs and also trailed behind the wearer. Men's formal dress included agekubi collars and very wide sleeves.

The concept of the hidden body remained, with ideologies suggesting that the clothes served as "protection from the evil spirits and outward manifestation of a social rank". This proposed the widely held belief that those of lower ranking, who were perceived to be of less clothing due to their casual performance of manual labor, were not protected in the way that the upper class were in that time period. This was also the period in which Japanese traditional clothing became introduced to the Western world.

During the later Heian period, various clothing edicts reduced the number of layers a woman could wear, leading to the kosode (lit., "small sleeve") garment—previously considered underwear—becoming outerwear by the time of the Muromachi period (1336-1573 CE).

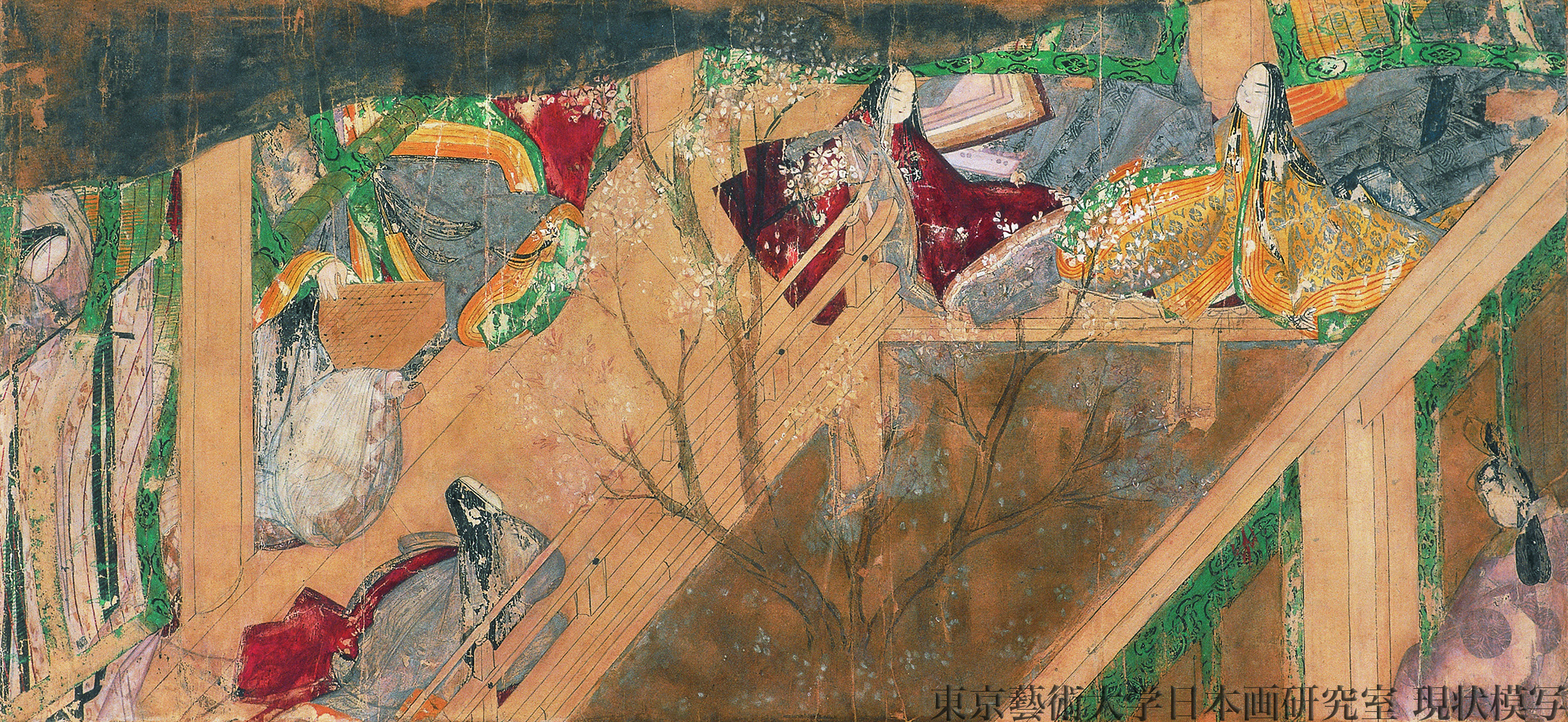
In the late Heian period, the jūnihitoe consisted of many layers (hitoe) worn over a plain kosode and hakama (The Tale of Genji, 12th century).

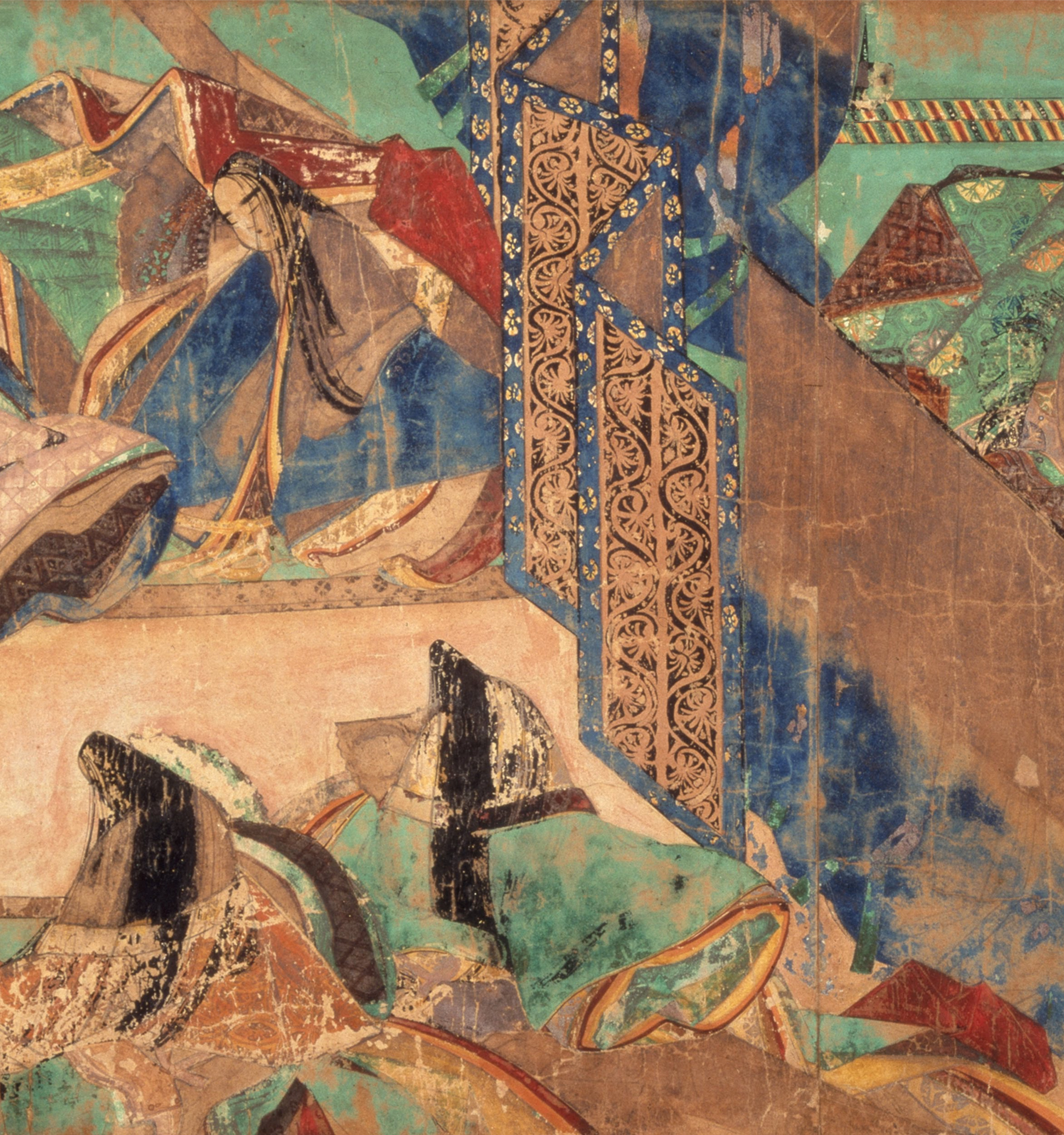
The courtiers in the foreground are wearing their hitoe off-the-shoulder, showing the kosode beneath.

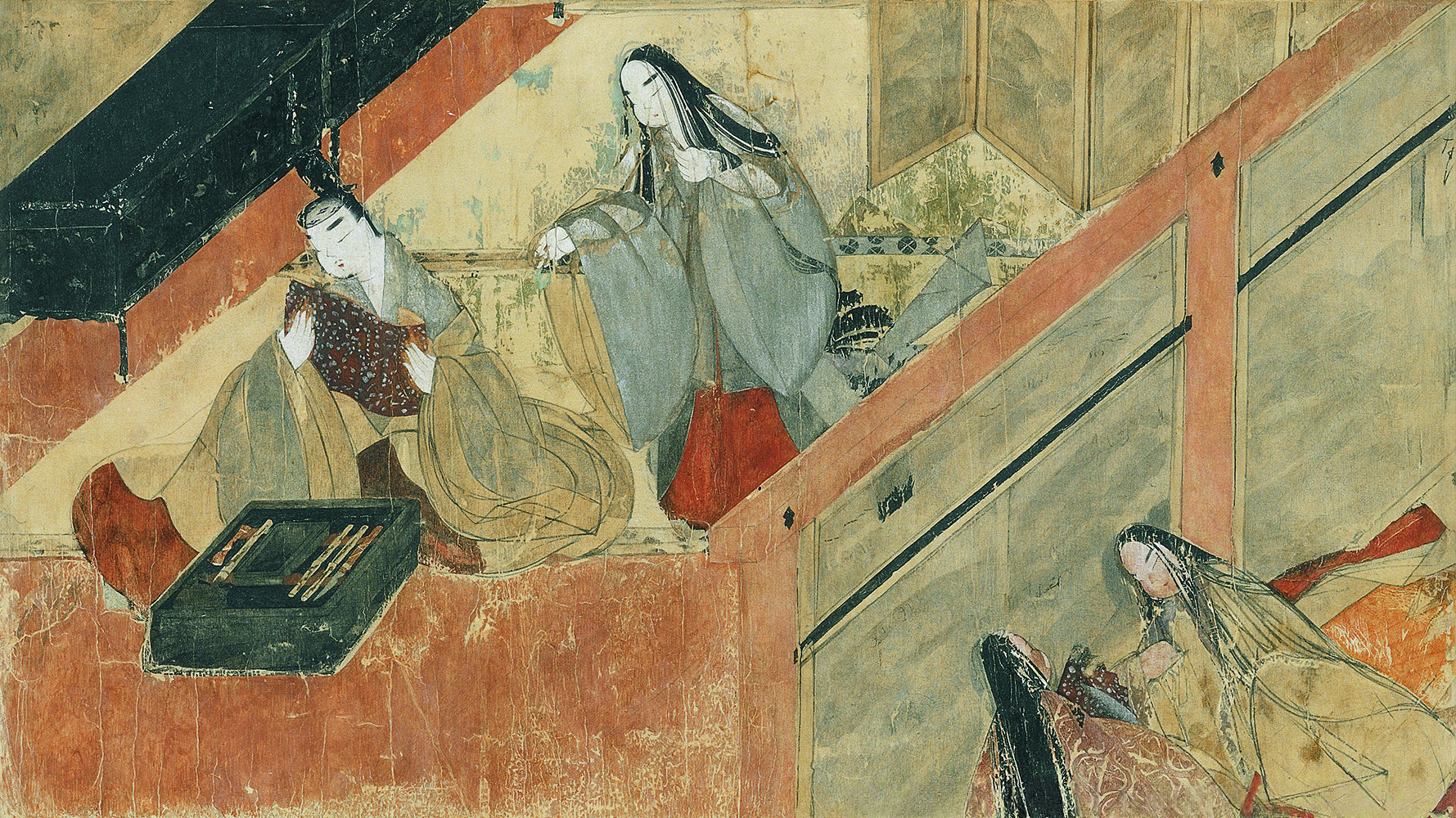
Tarikubi collars on husband and wife, in their home. Note red hakama of standing woman.

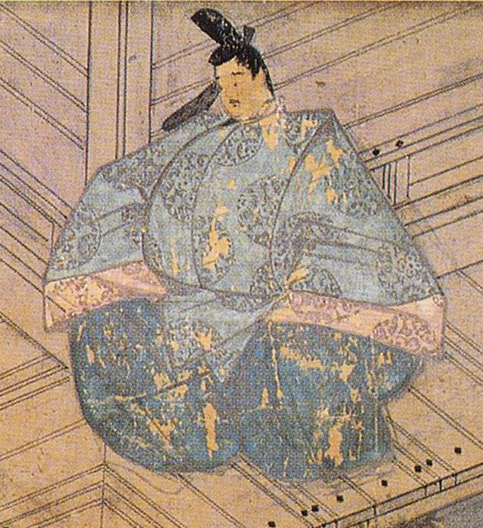
(Sashinuki)/nu-bakama and agekubi collar in men's court dress

=== Kamakura period (1185–1333) ===
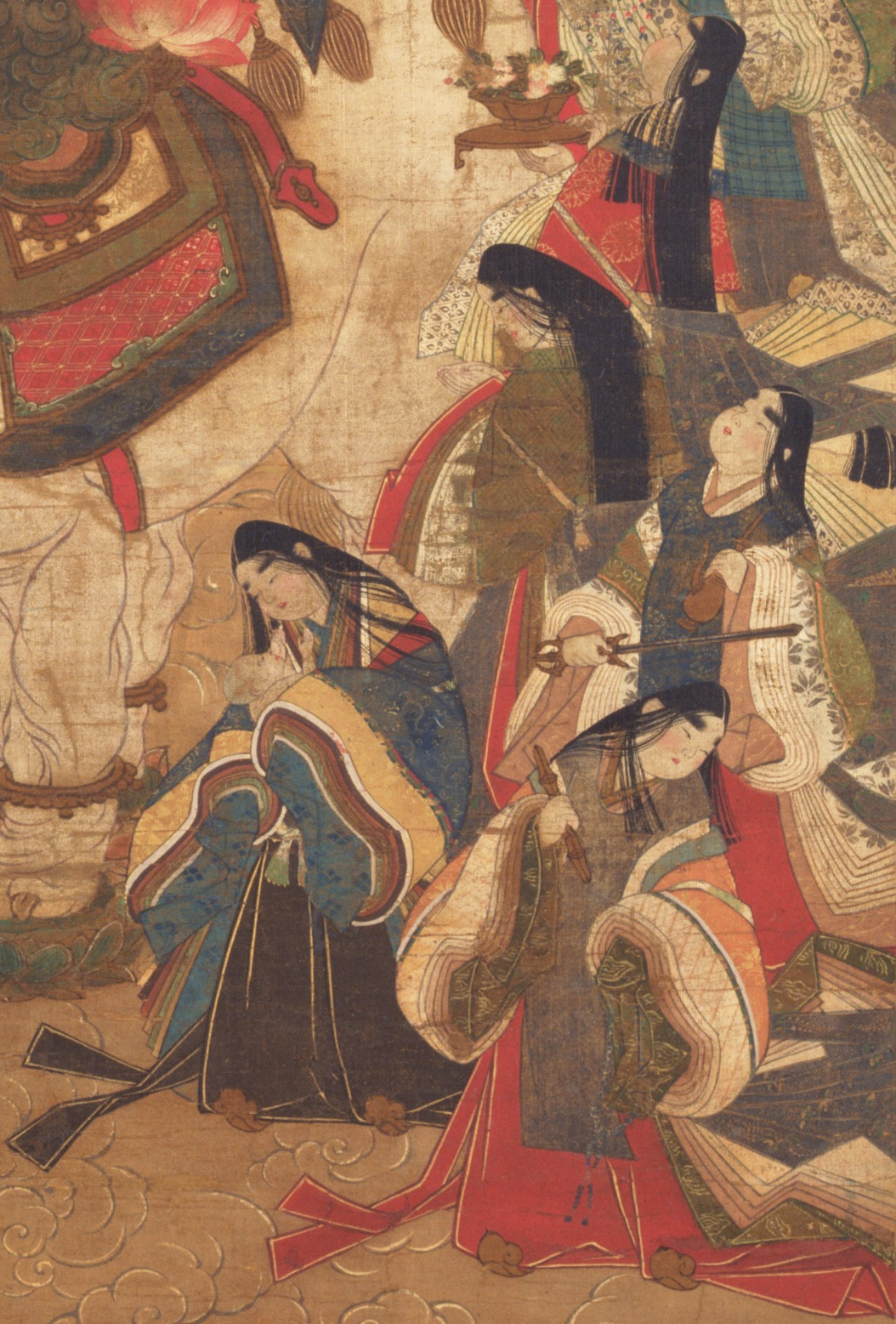
Fugen and the Ten Rasetsunyo, detail. Note red and purple naga-bakama with trailing waist ties.

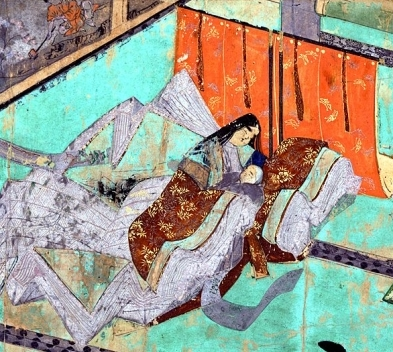
Empress Shoshi and son, 13th century illustration. Pale pleated mō train

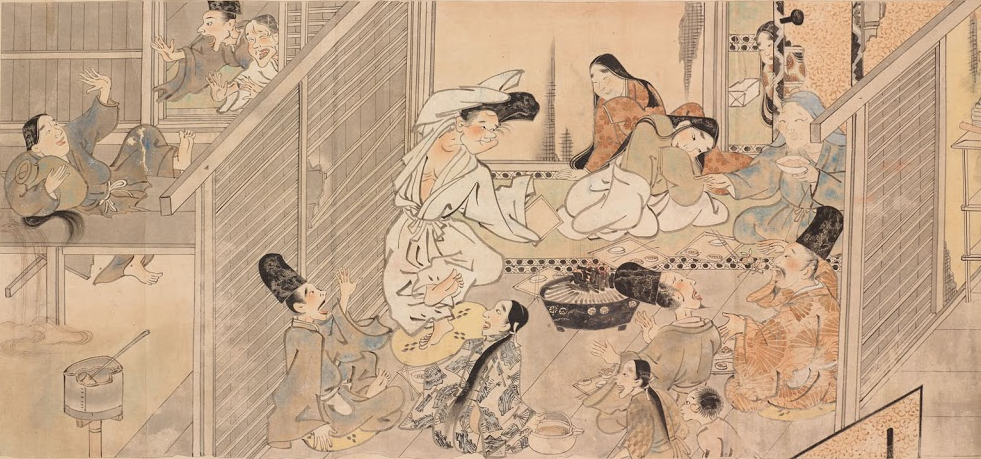
Simple unisex everyday dress, kosode and hakama, matching

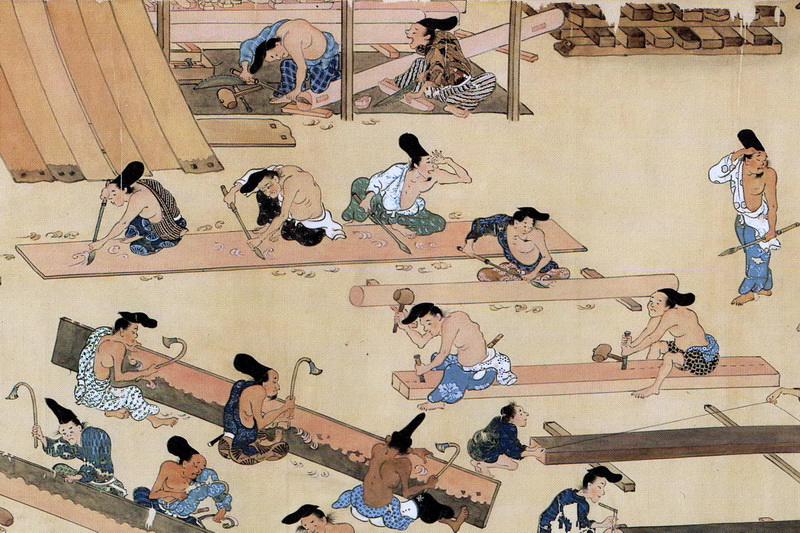
Carpenters in common dress, 1309; kosode and hakama do not match.

=== Azuchi-Momoyama period (1568–1600) ===
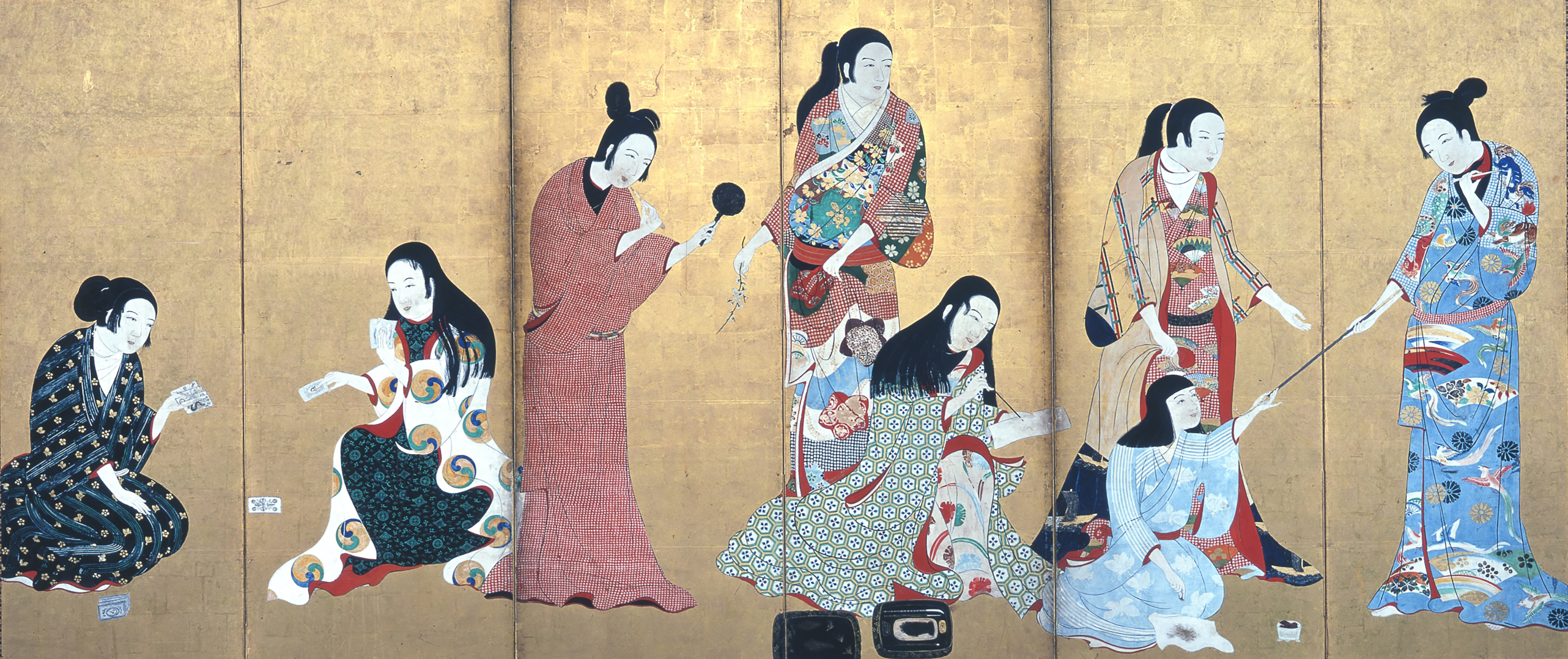
The kosode worn as outerwear. Note wider cut, and unisex narrow obi and shorter sleeves. Matsuura byōbu, c. 1650

Originally worn with hakama, the kosode began to be held closed with a small belt known as an obi instead. The kosode resembled a modern kimono, though at this time the sleeves were sewn shut at the back and were smaller in width (shoulder seam to cuff) than the body of the garment. During the Sengoku period (1467–1615)/Azuchi-Momoyama period (1568–1600), decoration of the kosode developed further, with bolder designs and flashy primary colours becoming popular. By this time, separate lower-body garments such as the mō and hakama were almost never worn, allowing full-length patterns to be seen.

=== Edo period (1603–1867) ===
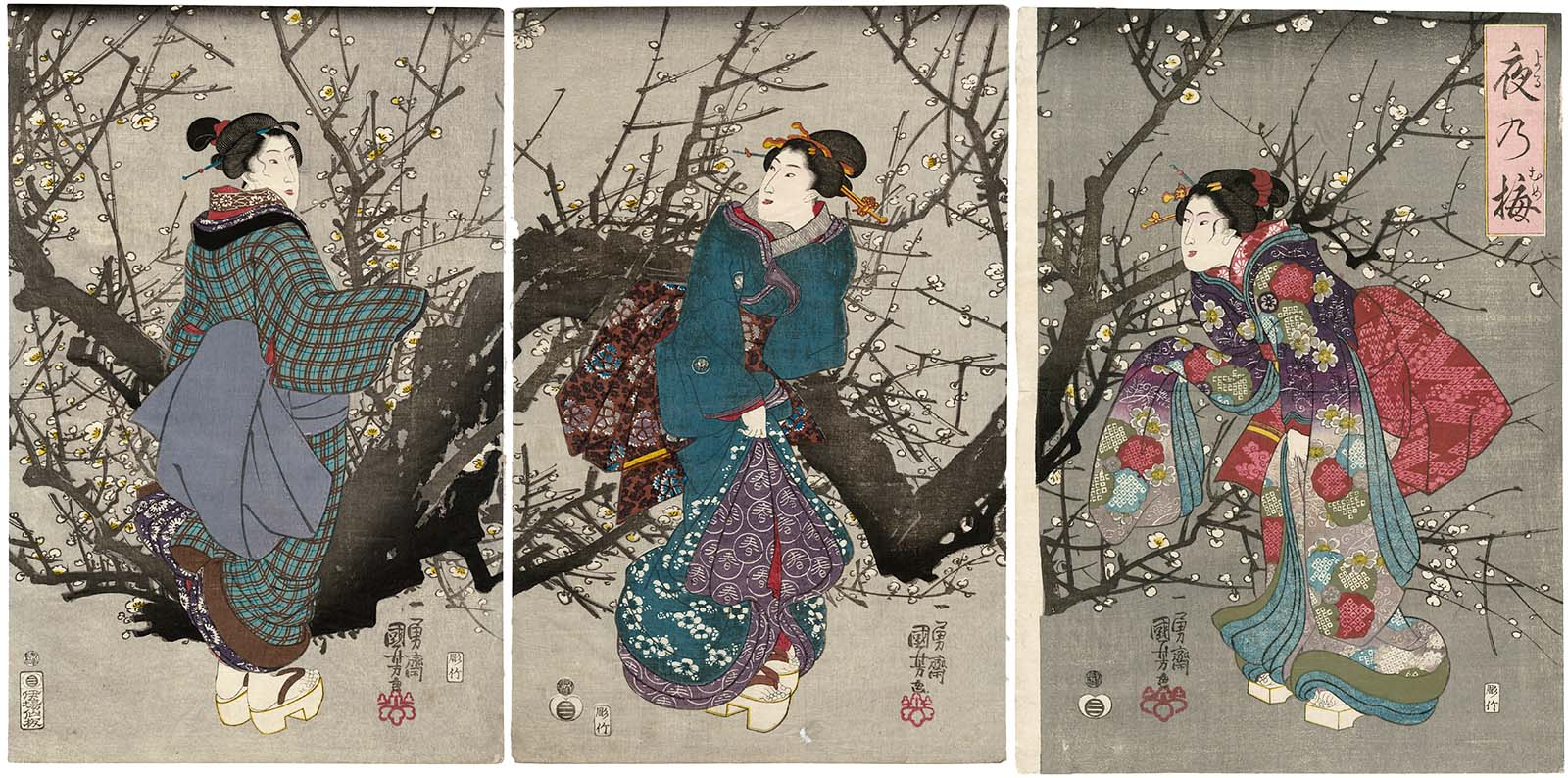
The overall silhouette of the kimono transformed during the Edo period due to the broadening of the obi, lengthening of the sleeves, and the style of wearing multiple layered kimono (Utagawa Kuniyoshi, Plum Blossoms at Night, woodblock print, 19th century).

During the Edo period (1603–1867 CE), both Japan's culture and economy developed significantly. A particular factor in the development of the Edo period was the early Genroku period (1688–1704 CE), wherein "Genroku culture" - luxurious displays of wealth and increased patronage of the arts - led to the further development of many art forms, including those of clothing. Genroku culture was spearheaded by the growing and increasingly-powerful merchant classes (chōnin); the clothing of chōnin classes, representative of their increasing economic power, rivalled that of the aristocracy and samurai classes, brightly coloured and utilising expensive production techniques, such as handpainted dyework. Rinzu, a damask fabric, also became the preferred material for kimono at this time, replacing the previously popular nerinuki plain-weave silk, which had been used to create tsujigahana.

In response to the increasing material wealth of the merchant classes, the Tokugawa shogunate issued a number of sumptuary laws for the lower classes, prohibiting the use of purple or red fabric, gold embroidery, and the use of intricately dyed shibori patterns. As a result, a school of aesthetic thought known as iki, which valued and prioritised the display of wealth through almost mundane appearances, developed, a concept of kimono design and wear that continues to this day as a major influence.

From this point onwards, the basic shape of both men's and women's kimono remained largely unchanged. The sleeves of the kosode began to grow in length, especially amongst unmarried women, and the obi became much longer and wider, with various styles of knots coming into fashion, alongside stiffer weaves of material to support them.

In the Edo period, the kimono market was divided into craftspeople, who made the tanmono and accessories, tonya, or wholesalers, and retailers.

=== Modern period (1869–), by regnal era ===
==== Meiji period (1868–1912) ====
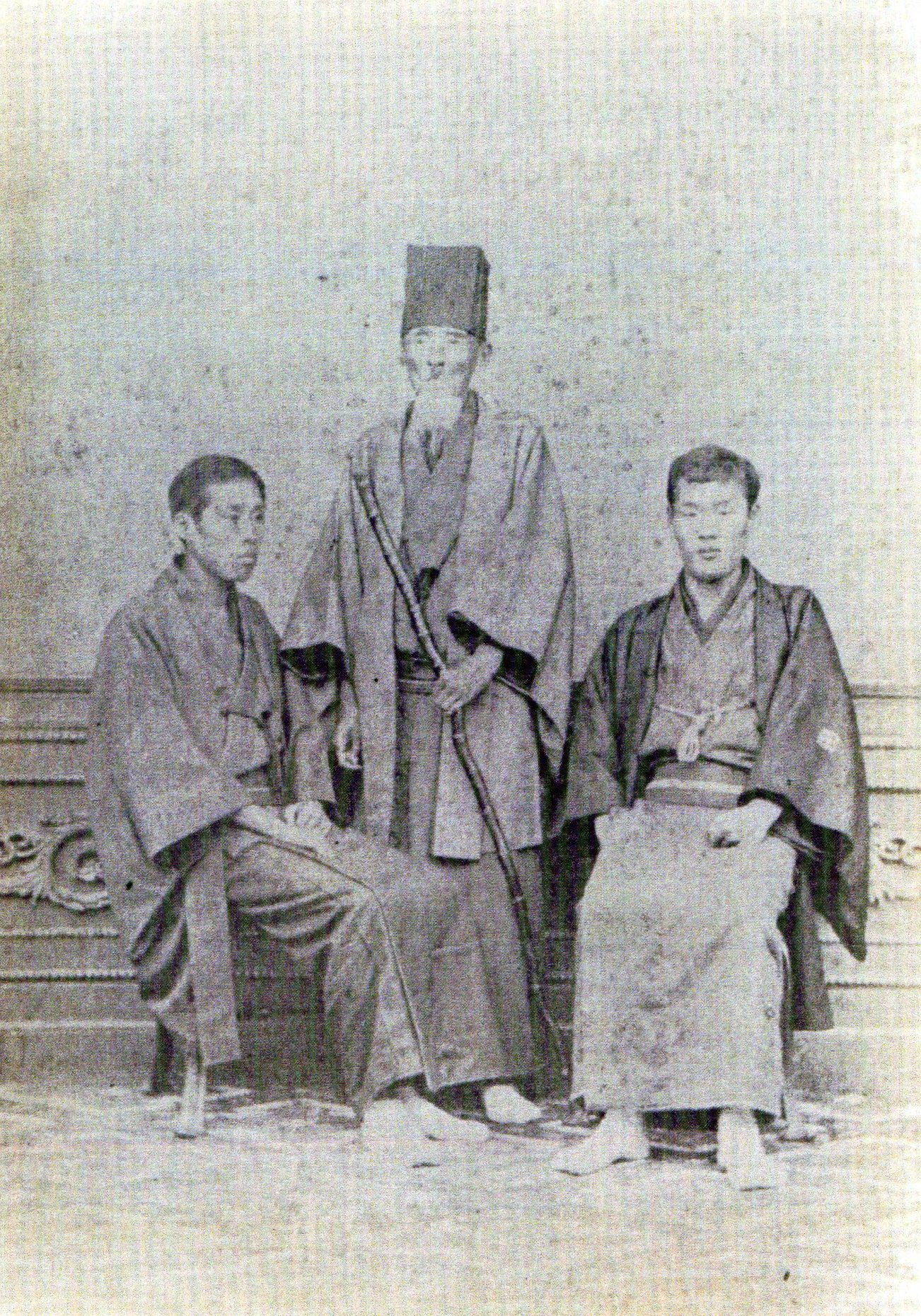
Part of the Ootuki family in kimono, 1874

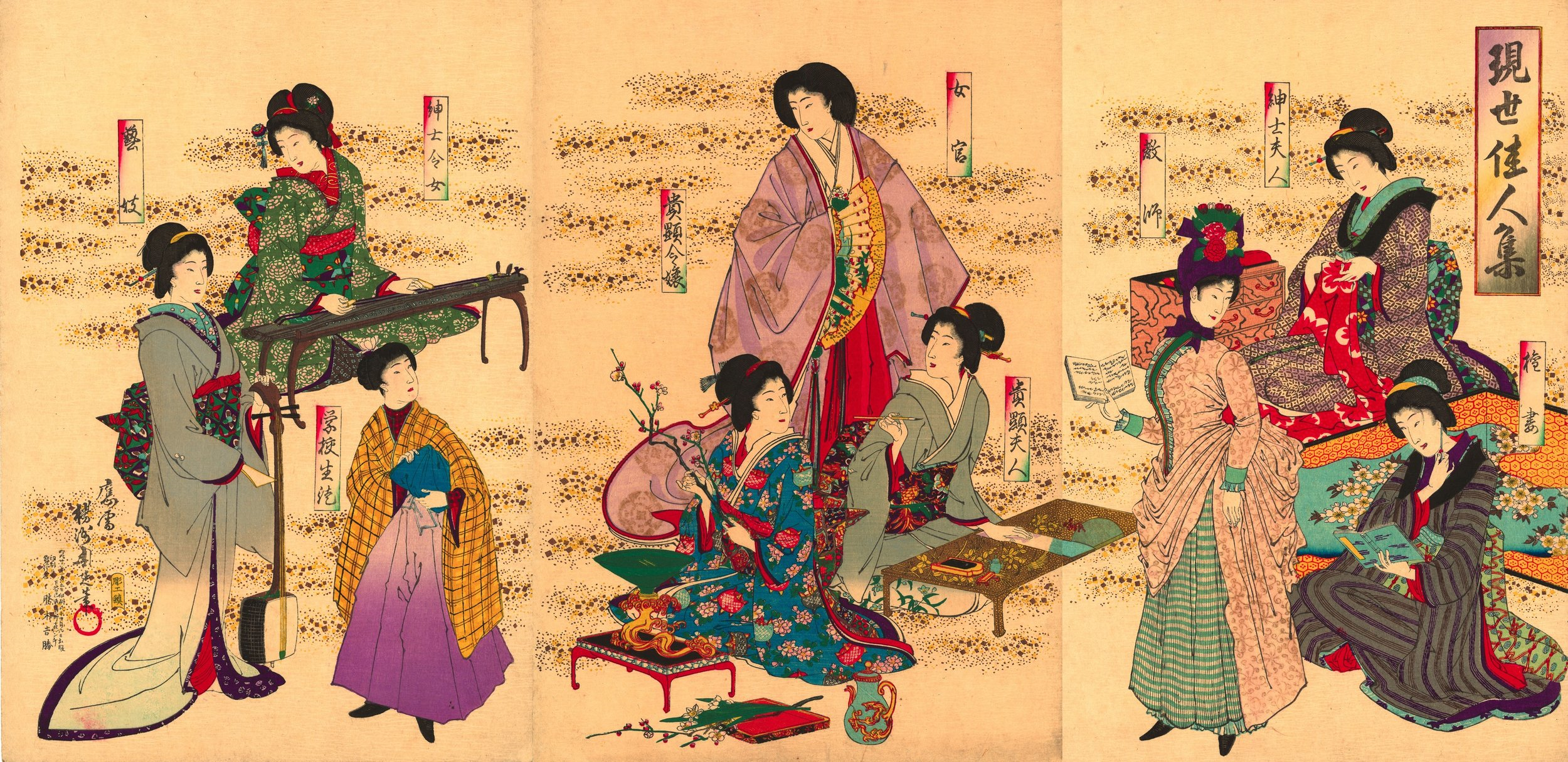
Assorted types of kimono, Western dress, a court lady in keiko, and a schoolgirl in a high-collared shirt, kimono and hakama. All wear both purple and red. 1890.

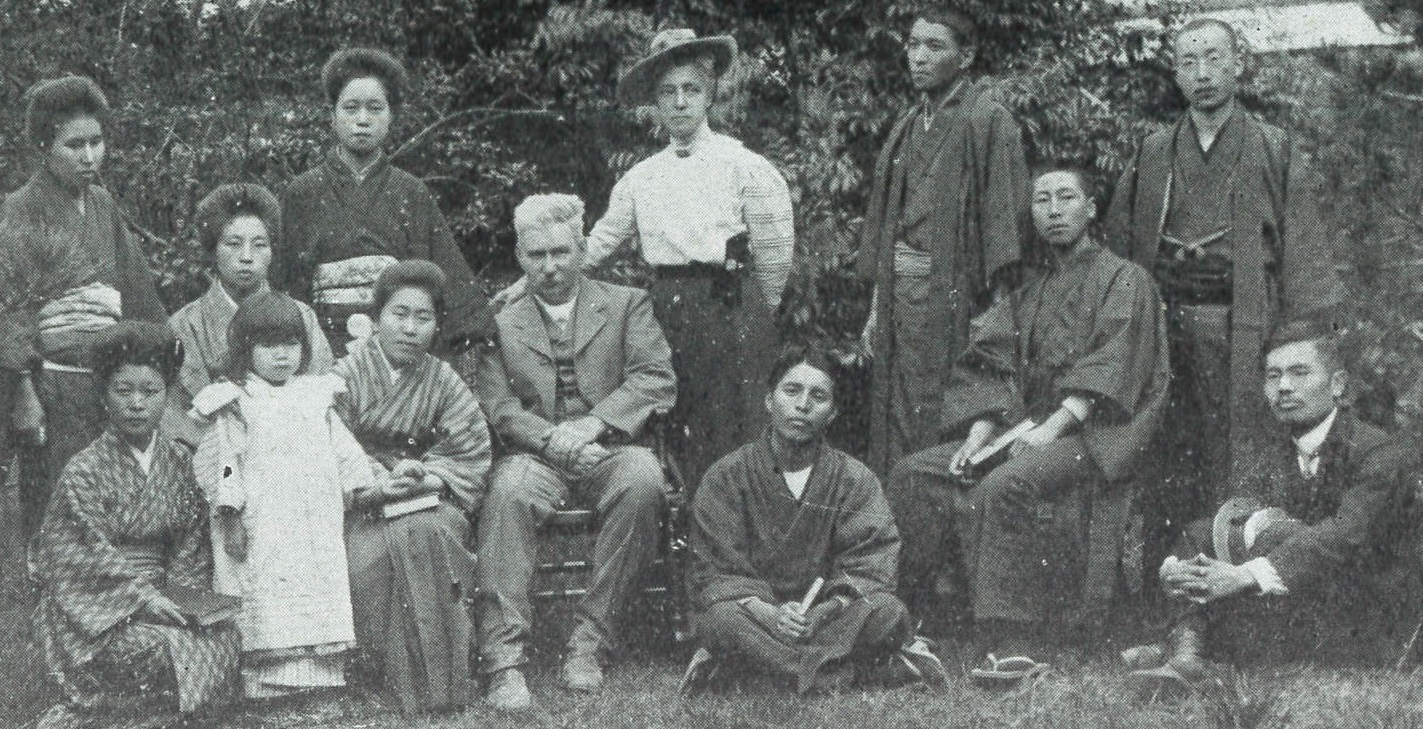
Family of Horiai Setsuko, May 1912, some in European dress, some in kimono, some wearing hakama. Women's hakama spread from the court as part of Japanese reform dress.

In 1869, the social class system was abolished, and with them, class-specific sumptuary laws. Kimono with formerly-restricted elements, like red and purple colours, became popular, particularly with the advent of synthetic dyestuffs such as mauvine.

Following the opening of Japan's borders in the early Meiji period to Western trade, a number of materials and techniques - such as wool and the use of synthetic dyestuffs - became popular, with casual wool kimono being relatively common in pre-1960s Japan; the use of safflower dye (beni) for silk linings fabrics (known as momi; literally, "red silk") was also common in pre-1960s Japan, making kimono from this era easily identifiable.

During the Meiji period, the opening of Japan to Western trade after the enclosure of the Edo period led to a drive towards Western dress as a sign of "modernity". After an edict by Emperor Meiji, policemen, railroad workers and teachers moved to wearing Western clothing within their job roles, with the adoption of Western clothing by men in Japan happening at a much greater pace than by women. Initiatives such as the Tokyo Women's & Children's Wear Manufacturers' Association (東京婦人子供服組合) promoted Western dress as everyday clothing.

In Japan, modern Japanese fashion history might be conceived as a gradual westernization of Japanese clothes; both the woolen and worsted industries in Japan originated as a product of Japan's re-established contact with the West in the early Meiji period (1850s-1860s). Before the 1860s, Japanese clothing consisted entirely of kimono of a number of varieties.

With the opening of Japan's ports for international trade in the 1860s, clothing from a number of different cultures arrived as exports; despite Japan's historic contact with the Dutch before this time through its southerly ports, Western clothing had not caught on, despite the study of and fascination with Dutch technologies and writings.

The first Japanese to adopt Western clothing were officers and men of some units of the shōgun's army and navy; sometime in the 1850s, these men adopted woolen uniforms worn by the English marines stationed at Yokohama. Wool was difficult to produce domestically, with the cloth having to be imported. Outside of the military, other early adoptions of Western dress were mostly within the public sector, and typically entirely male, with women continuing to wear kimono both inside and outside of the home, and men changing into the kimono usually within the home for comfort.

From this point on, Western clothing styles spread outwards of the military and upper public sectors, with courtiers and bureaucrats urged to adopt Western clothing, promoted as both modern and more practical. The Ministry of Education ordered that Western-style student uniforms be worn in public colleges and universities. Businessmen, teachers, doctors, bankers, and other leaders of the new society wore suits to work and at large social functions. Despite Western clothing becoming popular within the workplace, in schools and on the streets, it was not worn by everybody, and was actively considered uncomfortable and undesirable by some; one account tells of a father promising to buy his daughters new kimono as a reward for wearing Western clothing and eating meat. By the 1890s, appetite for Western dress as a fashion statement had cooled considerably, and the kimono remained an item of fashion.

A number of different fashions from the West arrived and were also incorporated into the way that people wore kimono; numerous woodblock prints from the later Meiji period show men wearing bowler hats and carrying Western-style umbrellas whilst wearing kimono, and Gibson girl hairstyles - typically a large bun on top of a relatively wide hairstyle, similar to the Japanese nihongami - became popular amongst Japanese women as a more low-effort hairstyle for everyday life.

By the beginning of the 20th century, Western dress had become a symbol of social dignity and progressiveness; however, the kimono was still considered to be fashion, with the two styles of dress essentially growing in parallel with one another over time. With Western dress being considered street wear and a more formal display of fashionable clothing, most Japanese people wore the comfortable kimono at home and when out of the public eye.

==== Taishō period (1912–1926) ====
Western clothing quickly became standard issue as army uniform for men and school uniform for boys, and between 1920 and 1930, the fuku sailor outfit replaced the kimono and undivided hakama as school uniform for girls. However, kimono still remained popular as an item of everyday fashion; following the Great Kantō Earthquake of 1923, cheap, informal and ready-to-wear meisen kimono, woven from raw and waste silk threads unsuitable for other uses, became highly popular, following the loss of many people's possessions. By 1930, ready-to-wear meisen kimono had become highly popular for their bright, seasonally changing designs, many of which took inspiration from the Art Deco movement. Meisen kimono were usually dyed using the ikat (kasuri) technique of dyeing, where either warp or both warp and weft threads (known as heiyō-gasuri) were dyed using a stencil pattern before weaving.

It was during the Taishō period that the modern formalisation of kimono and kimono types began to emerge. The Meiji period had seen the slow introduction of kimono types that mediated between the informal and the most formal, a trend that continued throughout the Taishō period, as social occasions and opportunities for leisure increased under the abolition of class distinctions. As Western clothing increased in popularity for men as everyday clothing, the kimono industry further established its own traditions of formal and informal dress for women; this saw the invention of the hōmongi, divisions of tomesode (short-sleeved) kimono for women, and montsuki hakama. The bridal kimono trousseau (oyomeiri dōgu), an uncommon practice of the upper classes in the Edo period, also became common throughout the middle classes; traditions of kimono bridalwear for marriage ceremonies were also codified in this time, which resembled the bridalwear of samurai-class women. Standards of kitsuke at this time began to slowly graduate to a more formalised, neatened appearance, with a flat, uniform ohashori and a smooth, uncreased obi, which also resembled the "proper" kitsuke of upper-class women. However, kitsuke standards were still relatively informal, and would not become formalised until after World War II.

==== Shōwa period (1926–1989) ====
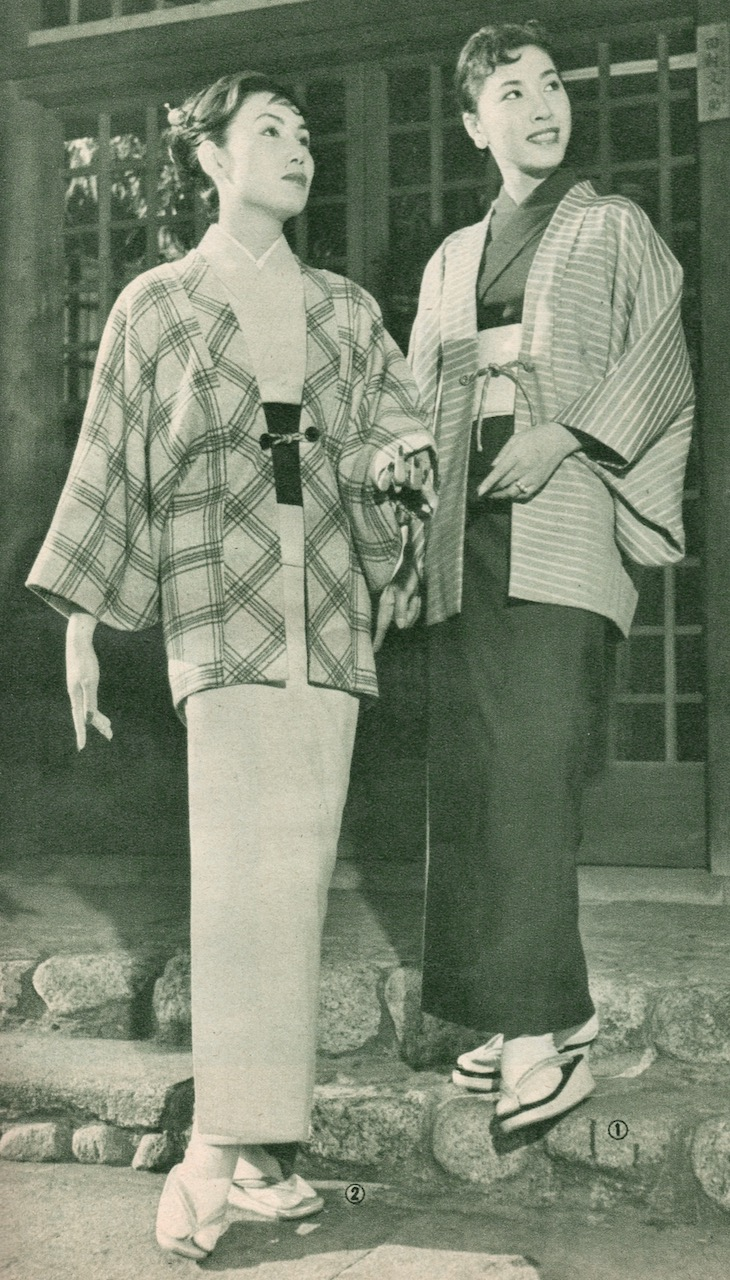
A 1957 clothing ad, showing postwar kitsuke standards for women, which promoted a smooth, streamlined appearance

While kimono were no longer common wear for men, they remained everyday wear for Japanese women until World War II (1940–1945). Though the Taishō period had seen a number of invented traditions, standards of kitsuke (wearing kimono) were still not as formalised in this time, with creases, uneven ohashori and crooked obi still deemed acceptable.

Until the 1930s, the majority of Japanese still wore kimono, and Western clothes were still restricted to out-of-home use by certain classes.

During the war, kimono factories shut down, and the government encouraged people to wear monpe (also romanised as mompe) - trousers constructed from old kimono - instead. Fibres such as rayon became widespread during WWII, being inexpensive to produce and cheap to buy, and typically featured printed designs. Cloth rationing persisted until 1951, so most kimono were made at home from repurposed fabrics.

In the second half of the 20th century, the Japanese economy boomed, and silk became cheaper, making it possible for the average family to afford silk kimono. The kimono retail industry had developed an elaborate codification of rules for kimono-wearing, with types of kimono, levels of formality, and rules on seasonality, which intensified after the war; there had previously been rules about kimono-wearing, but these were not rigidly codified and varied by region and class. Formalisation sought perfection, with no creases or uneveness in the kimono, and an increasingly tubular figure was promoted as the ideal for women in kimono. The kimono-retail industry also promoted a sharp distinction between Japanese and Western clothes; for instance, wearing Western shoes with Japanese clothing (while common in the Taishō period) was codified as improper; these rules on proper dressing are often described in Japanese using the English phrase "Time, Place, and Occasion" (TPO). As neither Japanese men or women commonly wore kimono, having grown up under wartime auspices, commercial kitsuke schools were set up to teach women how to don kimono. Men in this period rarely wore kimono, and menswear thus escaped most of the formalisation.).

Kimono were promoted as essential for ceremonial occasions; for instance, the expensive furisode worn by young women for Seijinshiki was deemed a necessity. Bridal trousseaus containing tens of kimono of every possible subtype were also promoted as de rigueur, and parents felt obliged to provide kimono trousseaus that cost up to 10 million yen (~£70,000), which were displayed and inspected publicly as part of the wedding, including being transported in transparent trucks.

By the 1970s, formal kimono formed the vast majority of kimono sales. Kimono retailers, due to the pricing structure of brand new kimono, had developed a relative monopoly on not only prices but also a perception of kimono knowledge, allowing them to dictate prices and heavily promote more formal (and expensive) purchases, as selling a single formal kimono could support the seller comfortably for three months. The kimono industry peaked in 1975, with total sales of 2.8 trillion yen (~£18 billion). The sale of informal brand new kimono was largely neglected.

==== Heisei period (1989–2019) ====
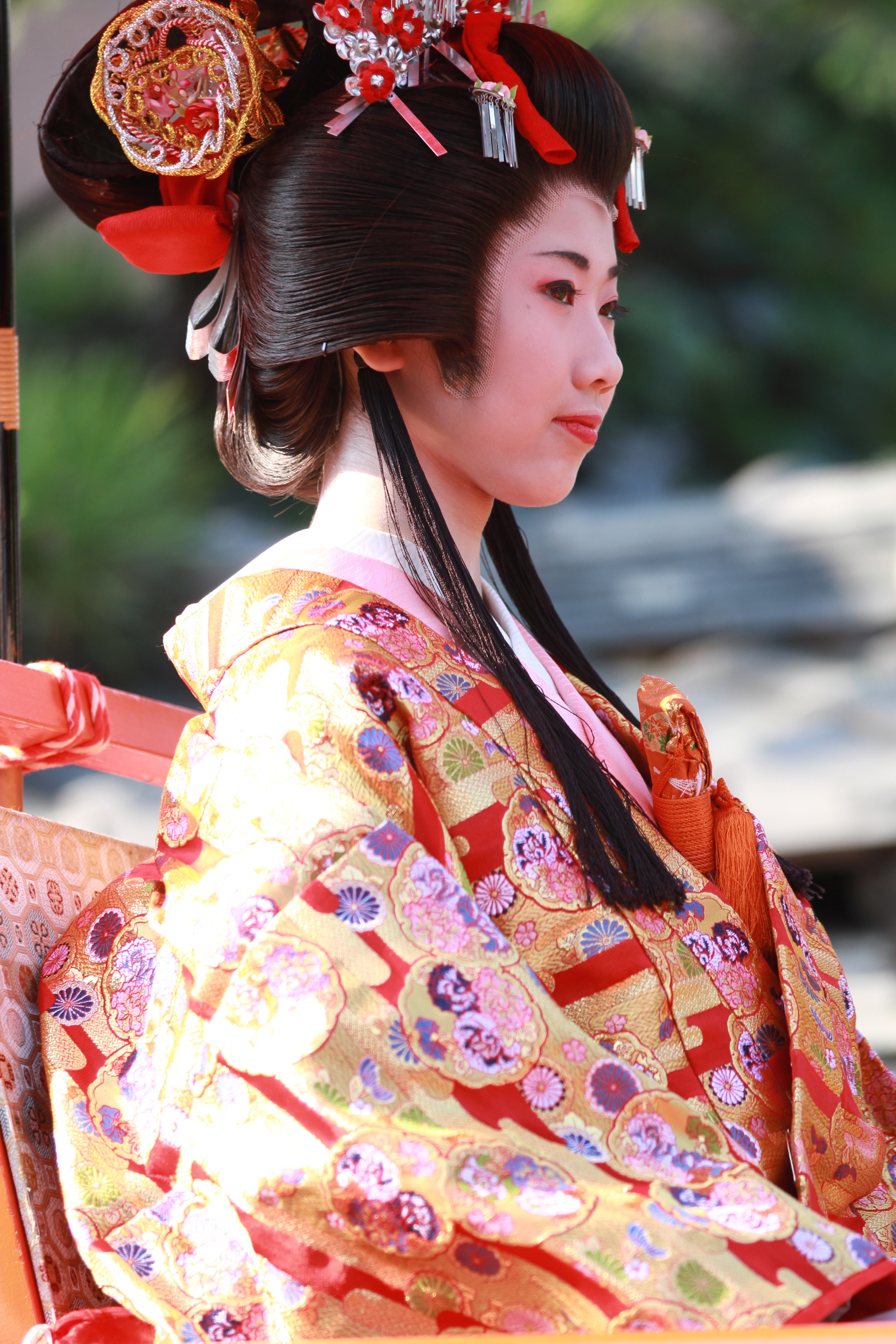
A young woman wearing very formal Japanese dress, 2010; note the katsuyama-style nihongami wig with attached locks and numerous kanzashi, paired with a formal brocade uchikake overkimono.

The economic collapse of the 1990s bankrupted much of the kimono industry and ended a number of expensive practices. The rules for how to wear kimono lost their previous hold over the entire industry, and formerly-expensive traditions such as bridal kimono trousseaus generally disappeared, and when still given, were much less extensive. It was during this time that it became acceptable and even preferred for women to wear Western dress to ceremonial occasions like weddings and funerals. Many women had dozens or even hundreds of kimono, mostly unworn, in their homes; a secondhand kimono, even if unworn, would sell for about 500 yen (less than £3.50; about US$5), a few percent of the bought-new price. In the 1990s and early 2000s, many secondhand kimono shops opened as a result of this.

In the early years of the 21st century, the cheaper and simpler yukata became popular with young people. Around 2010, men began wearing kimono again in situations other than their own wedding, and kimono were again promoted and worn as everyday dress by a small minority.

==== Reiwa period (2019–present) ====
Today, the vast majority of people in Japan wear Western clothing in the everyday, and are most likely to wear kimono either to formal occasions such as wedding ceremonies and funerals, or to summer events, where the standard kimono is the easy-to-wear, single-layer cotton yukata.

== Types of traditional clothing ==
=== Kimono ===
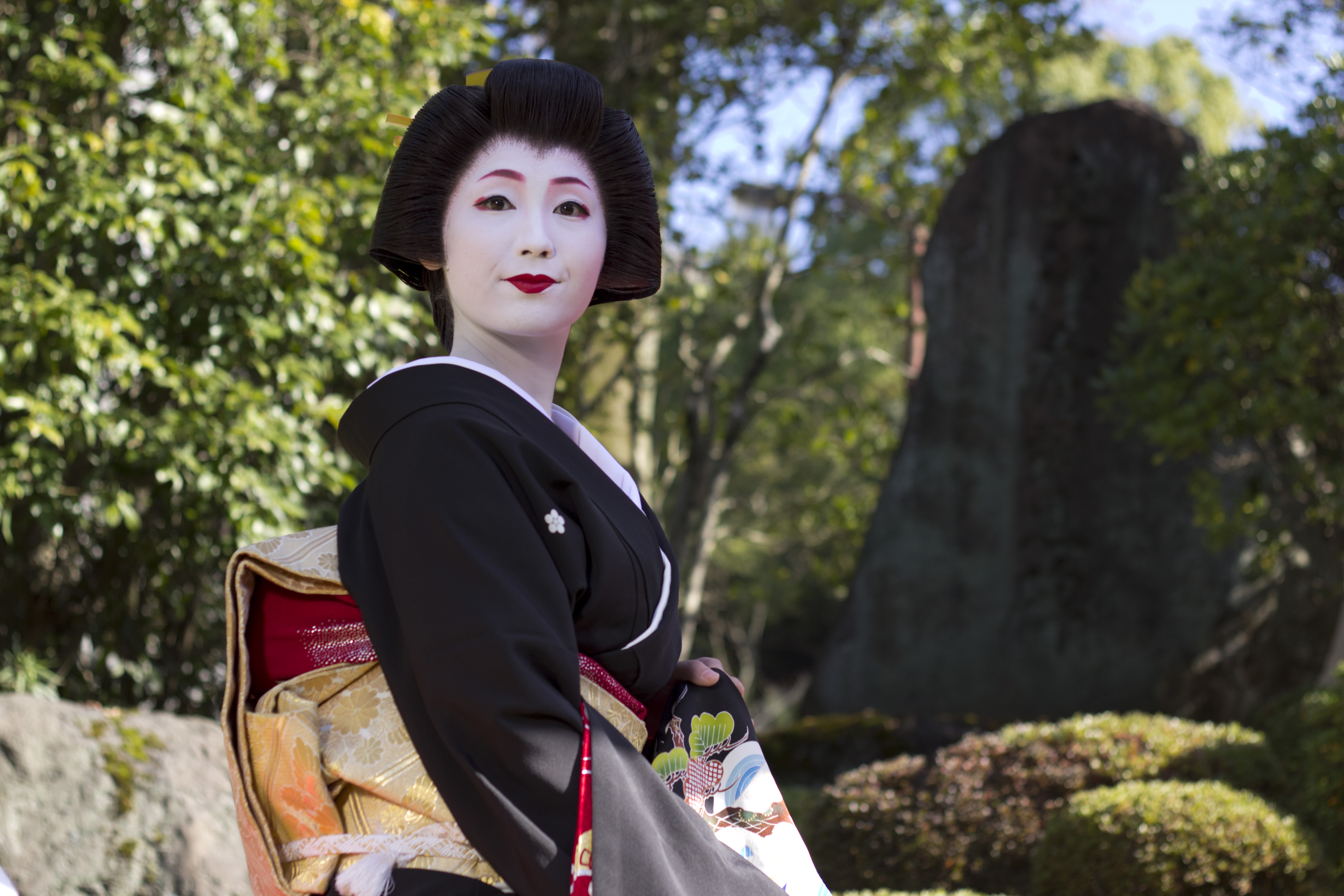
Gion geiko Sayaka wearing a kuromontsuki

The kimono (着物), labelled the "national costume of Japan", is the most well-known form of traditional Japanese clothing. The kimono is worn wrapped around the body, left side over right, and is sometimes worn layered. It is always worn with an obi, and may be worn with a number of traditional accessories and types of footwear. Kimono differ in construction and wear between men and women.

After the four-class system ended in the Tokugawa period (1603–1867), the symbolic meaning of the kimono shifted from a reflection of social class to a reflection of self, allowing people to incorporate their own tastes and individualize their outfit. The process of wearing a kimono requires, depending on gender and occasion, a sometimes detailed knowledge of a number of different steps and methods of tying the obi, with formal kimono for women requiring at times the help of someone else to put on. Post-WW2, kimono schools were built to teach those interested in kimono how to wear it and tie a number of different knots.

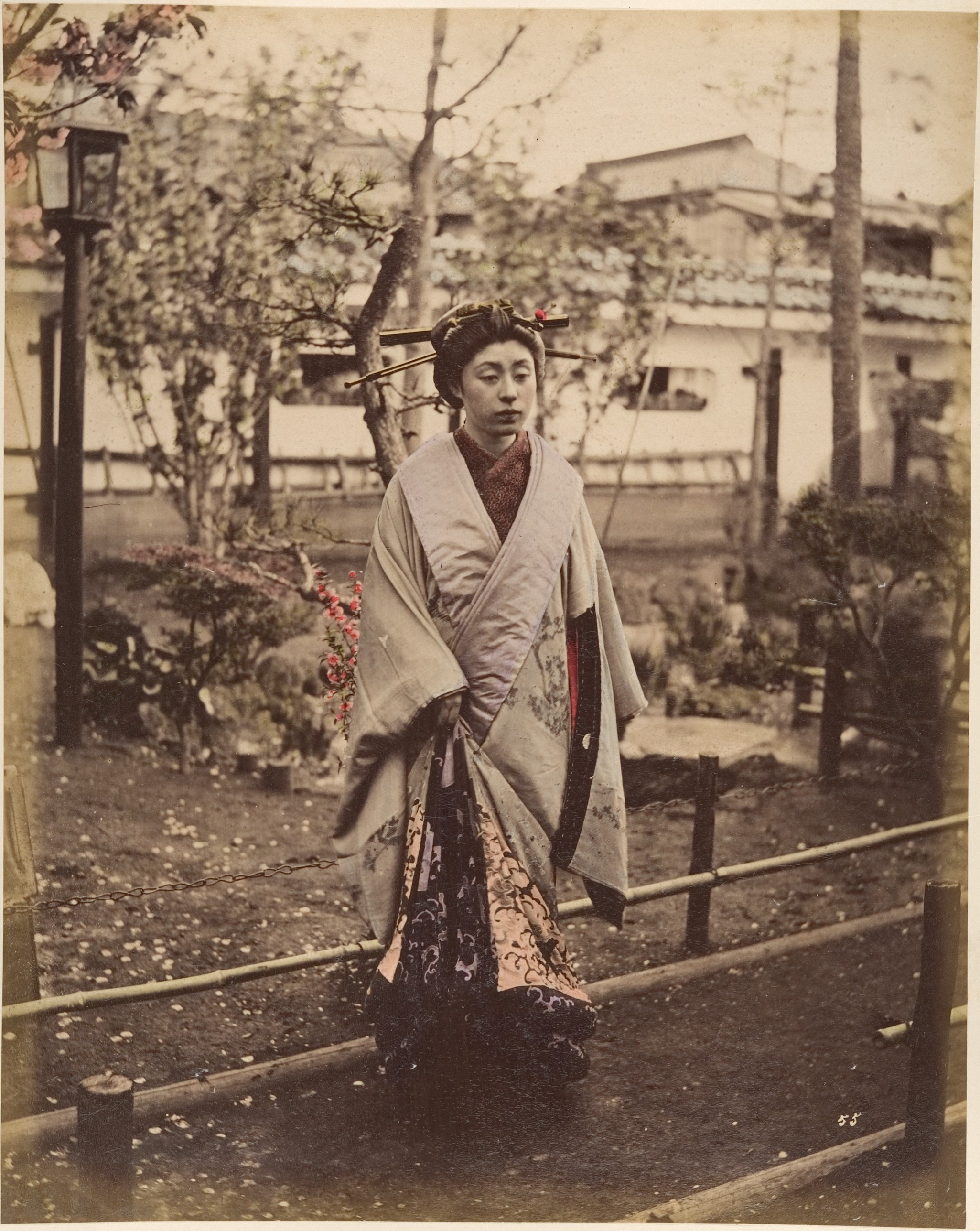
Japanese Woman in Traditional Dress Posing Outdoors by Suzuki Shin'ichi, c. 1870s

A number of different types of kimono exist that are worn in the modern day, with women having more varieties than men. Whereas men's kimono differ in formality typically through fabric choice, the number of crests on the garment (known as mon or kamon) and the accessories worn with it, women's kimono differ in formality through fabric choice, decoration style, construction and crests.

==== Women's kimono ====
- The furisode (lit., "swinging sleeve") is a type of formal kimono usually worn by young women, often for Coming of Age Day or as bridalwear, and is considered the most formal kimono for young women.
- The uchikake is also worn as bridalwear as an unbelted outer layer.
- The kurotomesode and irotomesode are formal kimono with a design solely along the hem, and are considered the most formal kimono for women outside of the furisode.
- The houmongi and the tsukesage are semi-formal women's kimono featuring a design on part of the sleeves and hem.
- The iromuji is a low-formality solid-colour kimono worn for tea ceremony and other mildly-formal events.
- The komon and edo komon are informal kimono with a repeating pattern all over the kimono.

Other types of kimono, such as the yukata and mofuku (mourning) kimono are worn by both men and women, with differences only in construction and sometimes decoration. In previous decades, women only stopped wearing the furisode when they got married, typically in their early- to mid-twenties; however, in the modern day, a woman will usually stop wearing furisode around this time whether she is married or not.

==== Dressing in kimono ====
The word kimono literally translates as "thing to wear", and up until the 19th century it was the main form of dress worn by men and women alike in Japan.

Traditionally, the art of wearing kimono (known as kitsuke) was passed from mother to daughter as simply learning how to dress, and in the modern day, this is also taught in specialist kimono schools. First, one puts on tabi, which are white cotton socks. Then the undergarments are put on followed by a top and a wraparound skirt. Next, the nagajuban (under-kimono) is put on, which is then tied by a koshihimo. Finally, the kimono is put on, with the left side covering the right, tied in place with one or two koshihimo and smoothed over with a datejime belt. The obi is then tied in place. Kimono are always worn left-over-right unless being worn by the dead, in which case they are worn right-over-left. When the kimono is worn outside, either zōri or geta sandals are traditionally worn.

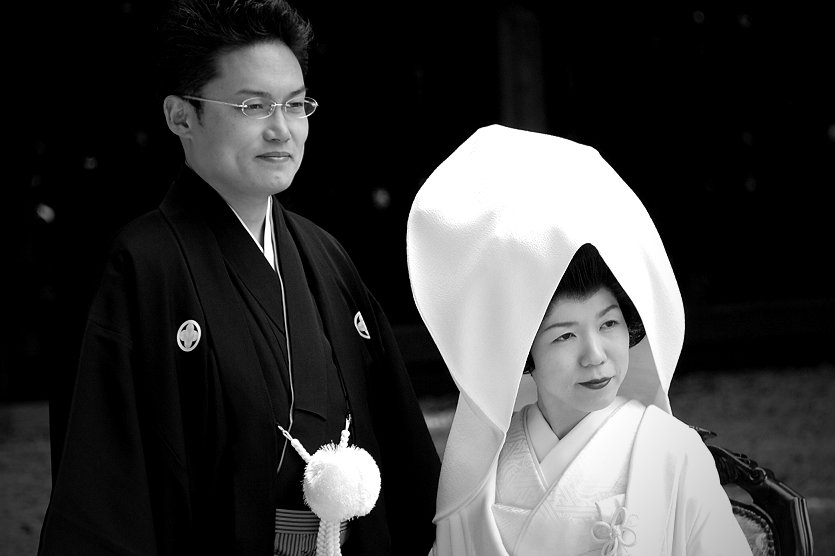
A couple wearing kimono on their wedding day

Women typically wear kimono when they attend traditional arts, such as a tea ceremonies or ikebana classes. During wedding ceremonies, the bride and groom will often go through many costume changes; though the bride may start off in an entirely-white outfit before switching to a colourful one, grooms will wear black kimono made from habutae silk.

Funeral kimono (mofuku) for both men and women are plain black with five crests, though Western clothing is also worn to funerals. Any plain black kimono with less than five crests is not considered to be mourning wear.

The "coming of age" ceremony, Seijin no Hi, is another occasion where kimono are worn. At these annual celebrations, women wear brightly coloured furisode, often with fur stoles around the neck. Other occasions where kimono are traditionally worn in the modern day include the period surrounding the New Year, graduation ceremonies, and Shichi-go-san, which is a celebration for children aged 3, 5 and 7.

==== Seasons ====
Kimono are matched with seasons. Awase (lined) kimono, made of silk, wool, or synthetic fabrics, are worn during the cooler months. During these months, kimono with more rustic colours and patterns (like russet leaves), and kimono with darker colours and multiple layers, are favoured. Lightweight cotton yukata are worn by men and women during the spring and summer months. In the warmer weather months, vibrant colors and floral designs (like cherry blossoms) are common.

==== Materials ====
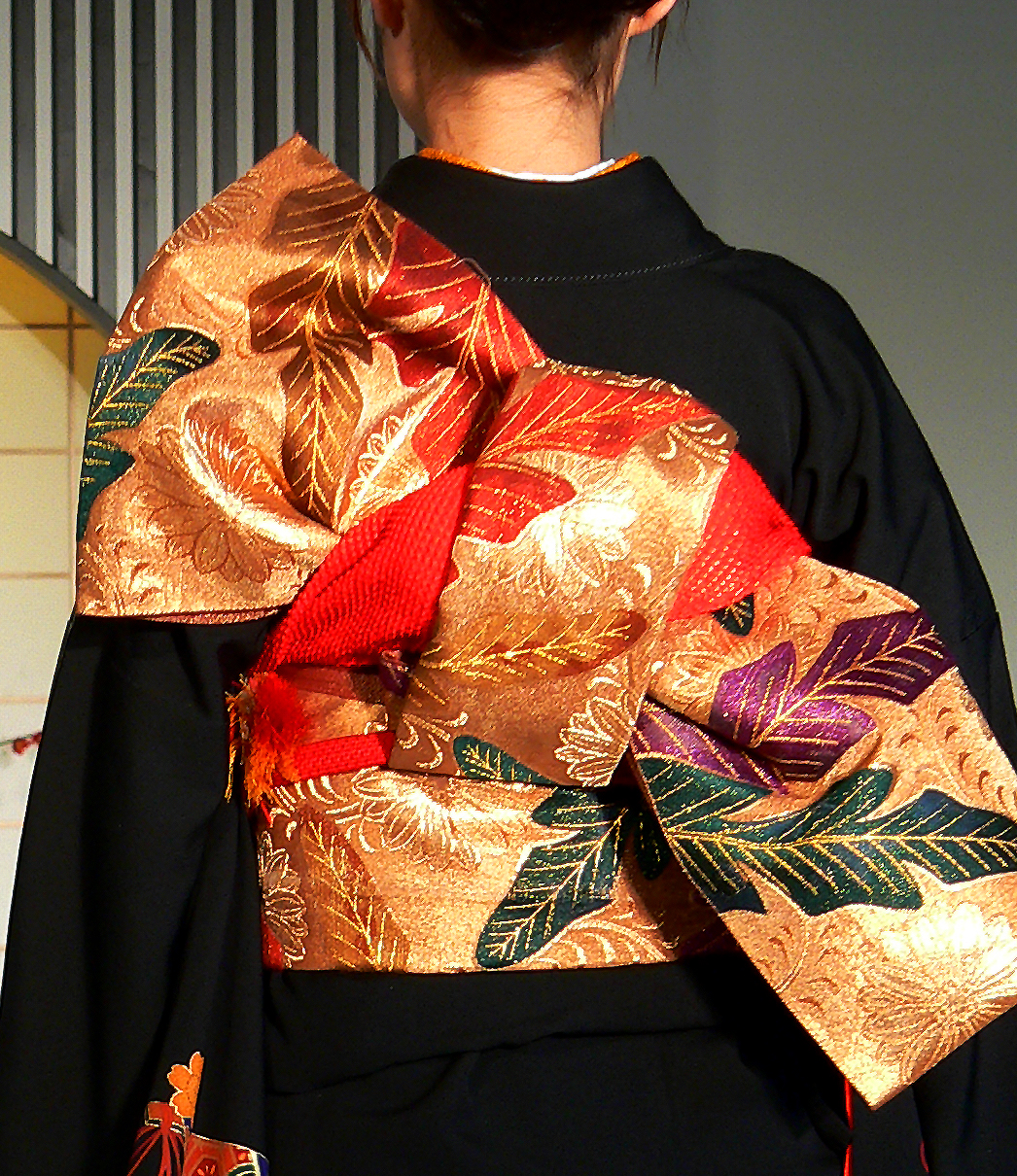
Formal tateya musubi obi knot

Up until the 15th century the vast majority of kimono worn by most people were made of hemp or linen, and they were made with multiple layers of materials. Today, kimono can be made of silk, silk brocade, silk crepes (such as chirimen) and satin weaves (such as rinzu). Modern kimono that are made with less-expensive easy-care fabrics such as rayon, cotton sateen, cotton, polyester and other synthetic fibers, are more widely worn today in Japan. However, silk is still considered the ideal fabric for more formal kimono.

Kimono are typically 39–43 inches (990–1,090 mm) long with eight 14–15 inches (360–380 mm) wide pieces. These pieces are sewn together to create the basic T-shape. Kimono are traditionally sewn by hand, a technique known as wasai. However, even machine-made kimono require substantial hand-stitching.

Kimono are traditionally made from a single bolt of fabric called a tanmono. Tanmono come in standard dimensions, and the entire bolt is used to make one kimono. The finished kimono consists of four main strips of fabric — two panels covering the body and two panels forming the sleeves — with additional smaller strips forming the narrow front panels and collar. Kimono fabrics are frequently hand-made and -decorated.

Kimono are worn with sash-belts called obi, of which there are several varieties. In previous centuries, obi were relatively pliant and soft, so literally held the kimono closed; modern-day obi are generally stiffer, meaning the kimono is actually kept closed through tying a series of flat ties, called himo, around the body. The two most common varieties of obi for women are fukuro obi, which can be worn with everything but the most casual forms of kimono, and nagoya obi, which are narrower at one end to make them easier to wear.

=== Yukata ===
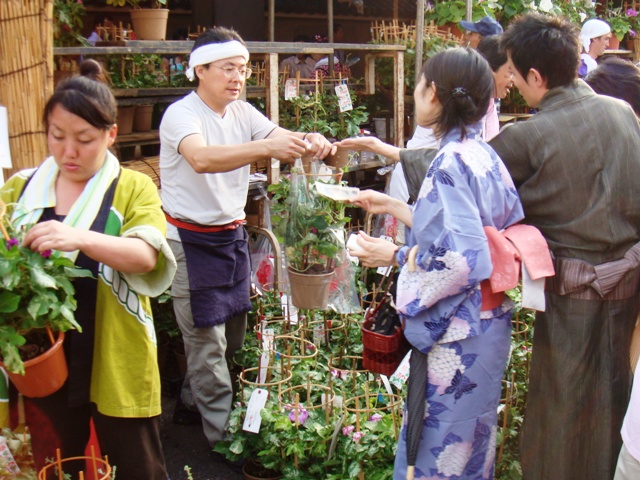
A couple in yukata buy morning glories at the Asagao Festival in Tokyo.

The yukata (浴衣) is an informal kimono worn specifically in the spring and summer, and it is generally less expensive than the traditional kimono. Because it was made for warm weather, yukata are almost entirely made of cotton of an often lighter weight and brighter color than most kimono fabrics. It is worn for festivals and cherry blossom viewing ceremonies.

=== Hakama, obi, zōri ===
The hakama, which resembles a long, wide pleated skirt, is generally worn over the kimono and is considered formal wear. Although it was traditionally created to be worn by men of all occupations (craftsmen, farmers, samurai, etc.), it is now socially accepted to be worn by women as well.

The obi is similar to a belt, wrapping around the outer kimono and helping to keep all of the layers together, though it does not actually tie them closed. Obi are typically long, rectangular belts that can be decorated and coloured in a variety of different ways, as well as being made of a number of different fabrics. Modern obi are typically made of a crisp, if not stiff, weave of fabric, and may be relatively thick and unpliant.

Zōri are a type of sandal worn with kimono that resemble flip-flops by design, with the exception that the base is sturdier and at times forms a gently sloping heel. Zōri can be made of wood, leather and vinyl, with more formal varieties featuring decorated straps (known as hanao) that may be embroidered and woven with gold and silver yarn. These shoes are typically worn with white socks usually mostly covered by the kimono's hem. Geta are sandals similar to zōri that are made to be worn in the snow or dirt, featured with wooden columns underneath the shoes.

=== Suteteko ===
Beginning in 1881, Japanese men wore suteteko, a kind of underpants named after a song. Kaori Shoji of the Japan Times wrote that they would be "best be described as a loose, thin, crepe cotton version of long johns." Initially men used it under kimono. By 2012 new variations of it emerged. Shoji stated that in 2012 the garment still emotionally symbolized the summer, even though there was a sense of embarrassment around it; she stated that it was more common until the 1990s.

== Design ==
=== Designers ===
Multiple designers use the kimono as a foundation for their current designs, being influenced by its cultural and aesthetic aspects and including them into their garments.

Issey Miyake is most known for crossing boundaries in fashion and reinventing forms of clothing while simultaneously transmitting the traditional qualities of the culture into his work. He has explored various techniques in design, provoking discussion on what identifies as "dress". He has also been tagged the "Picasso of Fashion" due to his recurring confrontation of traditional values. Miyake found interest in working with dancers to create clothing that would best suit them and their aerobic movements, eventually replacing the models he initially worked with for dancers, in hopes of producing clothing that benefits people of all classifications. His use of pleats and polyester jersey reflected a modern form of fashion due to their practical comfort and elasticity. Over 10 years of Miyake's work was featured in Paris in 1998 at the "Issey Miyake: Making Things" exhibition. His two most popular series were titled, "Pleats, Please" and "A-POC (A piece of Cloth)".

Yohji Yamamoto and Rei Kawakubo are Japanese fashion designers who share similar tastes in design and style, their work often considered by the public to be difficult to differentiate. They were influenced by social conflicts, as their recognizable work bloomed and was influenced by the post war era of Japan. They differ from Miyake and several other fashion designers in their dominating use of dark colors, especially the color black. Traditional clothing often included a variety of colors in their time, and their use of "the absence of color" provoked multiple critics to voice their opinions and criticize the authenticity of their work. American Vogue of April 1983 labeled the two "avant-garde designers", eventually leading them to their success and popularity.

=== Aesthetics ===
The Japanese are often recognized for their traditional art and its capability of transforming simplicity into creative designs. As stated by Valerie Foley, "Fan shapes turn out to be waves, waves metamorphose into mountains; simple knots are bird wings; wobbly semicircles signify half-submerged Heian period carriage wheels". These art forms have been transferred onto fabric that then mold into clothing. With traditional clothing, specific techniques are used and followed, such as metal applique, silk embroidery, and paste- resist. The type of fabric used to produce the clothing was often indicative of a person's social class, for the wealthy were able to afford clothing created with fabrics of higher quality. Stitching techniques and the fusion of colors also distinguished the wealthy from the commoner, as those of higher power had a tendency to wear ornate, brighter clothing.

== Influence on modern fashion ==
=== Tokyo street fashion ===
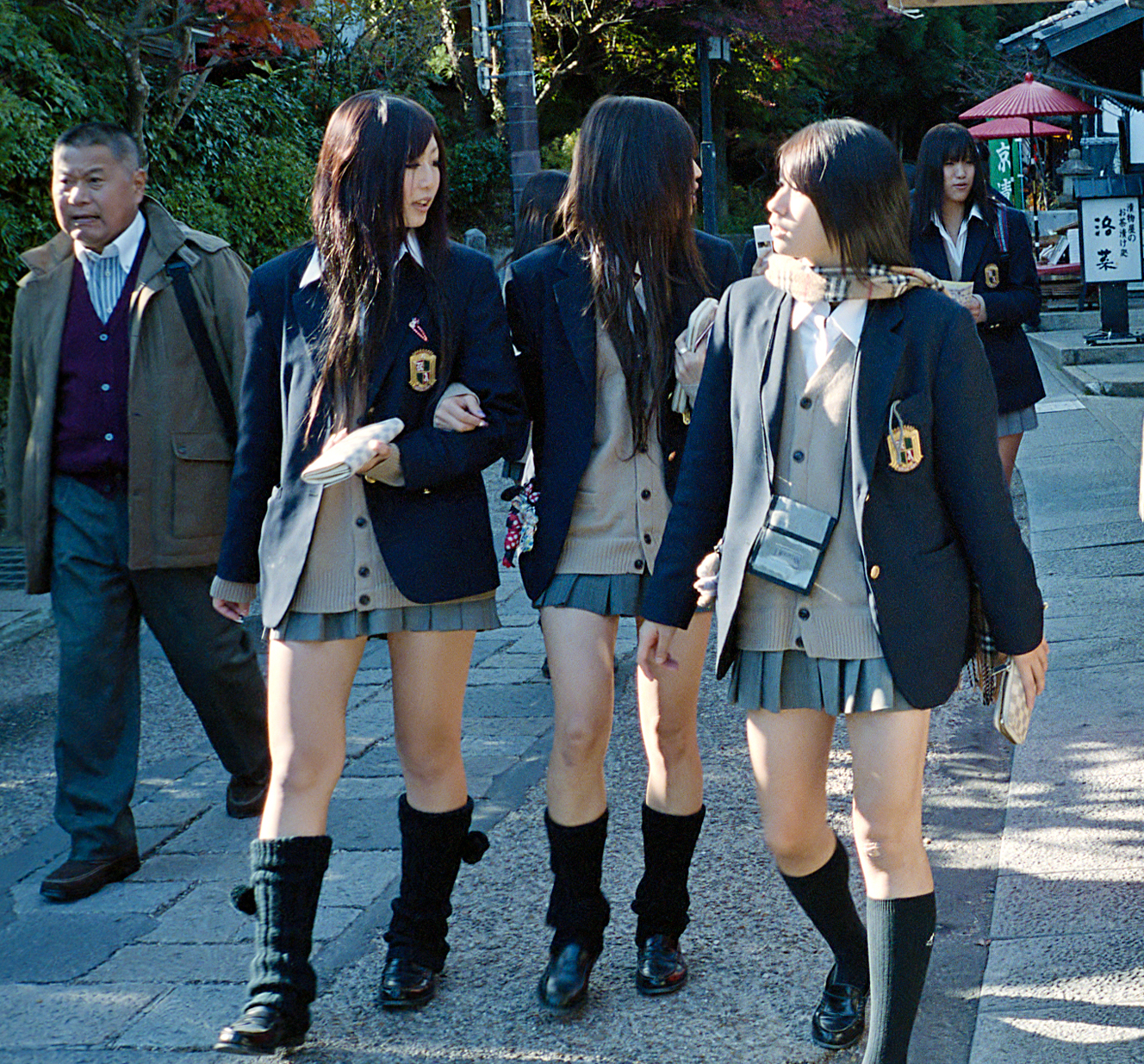
Kogal girls, identified by shortened Japanese school uniform skirts

Japanese street fashion emerged in the 1990s and differed from traditional fashion in the sense that it was initiated and popularized by the general public, specifically teenagers, rather than by fashion designers. Different forms of street fashion have emerged in different Tokyo locales, such as the rorīta in Harajuku, the koakuma ageha of Shibuya or the Gyaru subculture fashion style.

Lolita fashion became popular in the mid-2000s. It is characterized by "a knee length skirt or dress in a bell shape assisted by petticoats, worn with a blouse, knee high socks or stockings and a headdress". Different sub-styles of lolita include casual, sweet, gothic, black and hime ("princess"). Kogyaru or kogal is another Japanese street fashion based on a Shibuya club-hostess look. Women with this style tan their bodies and faces to a deep brown colour, and will frequently use light lipstick to accentuate the darkness and brownness of their complexion. The kogal trend is found in both Shibuya and Harajuku, and is influenced by a "schoolgirl" look, with participants often wearing short skirts, oversized knee-high socks, and sparkling accessories.

== See also ==
- Culture of Japan
- Ryusou – traditional Okinawan clothing
- Hanfu – traditional Chinese clothing
- Hanbok – traditional Korean clothing
- Việt phục – traditional Vietnamese clothing
