= List of special places of scenic beauty, special historic sites and special natural monuments =

To protect Japan's cultural heritage, the government of Japan selects through the Agency for Cultural Affairs important items and designates them as Cultural Properties under the Law for the Protection of Cultural Properties. Designated items are classified in a number of categories, one of which is monuments (記念物, kinenbutsu). This category includes historic locations such as shell mounds, ancient tombs, sites of palaces, sites of forts or castles, monumental dwelling houses and other sites of high historical or scientific value; gardens, bridges, gorges, mountains, and other places of great scenic beauty; and natural features such as animals, plants, and geological or mineral formations of high scientific value.

The government further designates "significant" monuments classifying them in three categories: historic sites (史跡, shiseki), places of scenic beauty (名勝, meishō), and natural monuments (天然記念物, tennen kinenbutsu). Items of particularly high significance receive higher classifications: special historic sites (特別史跡, tokubetsu shiseki), special places of scenic beauty (特別名勝, tokubetsu meishō), and special natural monuments (特別天然記念物, tokubetsu tennen kinenbutsu) respectively. As of January 12, 2026 there are 1042 natural monuments, 1923 historic sites and 433 places of scenic beauty. Out of these, there are 75 special natural monuments, 36 special places of scenic beauty and 66 special historic sites.

Since a single item can fall under more than one of these categories, the total number of sites is less than the sum of designations.

== Criteria ==
The Agency for Cultural Affairs designates monuments based on a number of criteria. A monument can be designated based on more than one of these criteria:

=== Places of scenic beauty and special places of scenic beauty ===
Location of special places of scenic beauty.

1. Parks and gardens
2. Bridges and embankments
3. Flowering trees, flowering grass, autumn colors, green trees and other places of dense growth
4. Places inhabited by birds and wild animals, fish/insects and others
5. Rocks, caves
6. Ravines, gorges, waterfalls, mountain streams, abysses
7. Lakes, marshes, wetlands, floating islands, springs
8. Sand dunes, spits, seasides, islands
9. Volcanoes, onsen
10. Mountains, hills, plateaus, plains, rivers
11. Viewpoints

=== Historic sites and special historic sites ===
1. Shell mounds, settlement ruins, kofun, other historic ruins of this type
2. Ruins of fortified towns, castles, government administration offices, old battlefields and other historic ruins related to politics or government
3. Remains of shrines and temples, former compound grounds and other historic ruins related to religion
4. Schools, research institutions, cultural facilities and other historic ruins related to education, learning or culture
5. Medical care and welfare facilities, life related institution, other society and life related historic ruins
6. Transport and communication facilities, forest conservation and flood control facilities, manufacture facilities and other historic sites related to finance or manufacture activities
7. Graves and stone monuments with inscriptions
8. Former residences, gardens, ponds and other areas of particular historical significance
9. Ruins related to foreign countries or foreigners

=== Natural monuments and special natural monuments ===
1. Animals
  1. Well-known animals peculiar to Japan and their habitat
  2. Animals which are not peculiar to Japan, but need to be preserved as well-known characteristic Japanese animals, and their habitat
  3. Animals or animal groups peculiar to Japan within their natural environment
  4. Domestic animals peculiar to Japan
  5. Well-known imported animals presently in a wild state, with the exception of domestic animals; their habitat
  6. Particularly valuable animal specimen
2. Plants, vegetation
  1. Old trees of historic interest, gigantic trees, old trees, deformed trees, cultivated pulpwood, roadside trees, shrine forests
  2. Representative primeval forests, rare forest flora
  3. Representative alpine plants, special clusters of plants on rock ground
  4. Representative clusters of waste land plants
  5. Representative examples of coastal and sand ground vegetation
  6. Representative examples of areas of peat forming plants
  7. Clusters of plants growing in caves or grottoes
  8. Rare water plants in garden ponds, onsen, lakes, marshes, streams, sea, etc.; algae, moss, microbes, etc.
  9. Remarkable occurrence of epiphytic plants on rocks, trees or shrubs
  10. Remarkable plant growth on marginal land
  11. Remarkable growth in the wild of crop plants
  12. Wild habitat of rare or near extinct plants
3. Geological and mineralogical features
  1. Rocks, mineral and fossil producing sites
  2. Conformable and unconformable strata
  3. Fold and thrust strata
  4. Geological features caused by the work of living creatures
  5. Phenomena related to earthquake dislocation and landmass motion
  6. Caves, grottoes
  7. Examples of rock organization
  8. Onsen and their sediments
  9. Erosion and weathering related phenomena
  10. Fumaroles and other items related to volcanic activity
  11. Ice and frost related phenomena
  12. Particularly precious rock, mineral and fossil specimen
4. Representative territories rich in natural monuments to be protected (Natural Protected Areas)

== Usage ==
The table's columns (except for Remarks and Photo) are sortable pressing the arrows symbols. The following gives an overview of what is included in the table and how the sorting works.

- Name: name of the monument as registered in the Database of Cultural Properties
- Special place of scenic beauty: criteria under which the monument has been designated or "-" if it is not a special place of scenic beauty
- Special historic site: criteria under which the monument has been designated or "-" if it is not a special historic site
- Special natural monument: criteria under which the monument has been designated or "-" if it is not a special natural monument
- Remarks: general remarks
- Location: "town-name prefecture-name" and geo coordinates of the monument if applicable
  - sorts as "prefecture-name town-name"
- Photo: picture of the monument

== Special places of scenic beauty, special historic Sites, special natural Monuments ==
Name	Special place of scenic beauty	Special historic site	Special natural monument	Remarks	Location	Photo
Mōtsū-ji garden (毛越寺庭園, mōtsūji teien)	1	—	—		Hiraizumi, Iwate; 38°59′16.31″N 141°6′28.98″E	A lake with stones in the water in front of wooded hills.
Matsushima (松島)	8, 11	—	—	One of the Three Views of Japan	Shiogama, Shichigahama, Rifu, Matsushima, Higashimatsushima, Miyagi; 38°21′59.13″N 141°4′27.87″E	Sea with small islets completely covered with trees.
Hamarikyu Gardens (旧浜離宮庭園, kyū hamarikyū teien)	1	2,8	—		Tokyo; 35°39′35.3″N 139°45′46.5″E	Bird eye view of a park with grassland, trees and ponds surrounded by tall buildings and a big street.
Koishikawa Kōrakuen Garden (小石川後楽園, koishikawa kōrakuen)	1	8	—		Tokyo; 35°42′19.63″N 139°44′57.37″E	Bird eye view of a wooded park surrounded by tall buildings and adjacent to a rail line.
Rikugi-en (六義園)	1	—	—		Tokyo; 35°43′58.66″N 139°44′47.48″E	A pond in a wooded park with a bridge and grassland.
Kurobe Gorge with Sarutobi Gorge and Mount Okukane (黒部峡谷 附 猿飛ならびに奥鐘山, kurobekyōkoku tsuketari sarutobi narabini okukaneyama)	6	—	4		Tateyama, Kurobe, Toyama; 36°37′23.18″N 137°41′11.4″E	A deep mountain valley with a river and wooded slopes.
Kenroku-en (兼六園)	1	—	—	One of the Three Great Gardens of Japan	Kanazawa, Ishikawa; 36°33′43.5″N 136°39′44.99″E	A stone lantern next to a tree in front of a pond. Beyond the lake there is a small wooden house built on poles above the water.
Ichijōdani Asakura Family Gardens (一乗谷朝倉氏庭園, Ichijōdani Asakura-shi teien)	1	—	—	The ruins at the same site are a Special Historic Site.	Fukui, Fukui; 35°59′57.95″N 136°17′43.52″E	Grass, stones and a forest.
Mitake Shōsenkyō Gorge (御嶽昇仙峡, mitake shōsenkyō)	5, 6	—	—		Kōfu and Kai, Yamanashi; 35°44′41.64″N 138°33′59.29″E	A wild river with lots of large stones in it running through a forest.
Kamikōchi (上高地)	6	—	4		Matsumoto, Nagano; 36°14′24.93″N 137°37′27.07″E	A suspension bridge over a river with high snowcovered mountains in the back.
Konchi-in Garden (金地院庭園, konchiin teien)	1	—	—		Kyoto, Kyoto; 35°0′38.29″N 135°47′24.02″E	Shrubs cut in round shapes beyond raked gravel and large stones.
Jishō-ji (Ginkaku-ji) Garden (慈照寺（銀閣寺）庭園, jishō-ji (ginkaku-ji) teien)	1	8	—		Kyoto, Kyoto; 35°1′35.78″N 135°47′54.31″E	Trees and a raked sand garden next to traditional Japanese buildings.
Rokuon-ji (Kinkaku-ji) Garden (鹿苑寺（金閣寺）庭園, rokuon-ji (kinkaku-ji) teien)	1	8	—		Kyoto, Kyoto; 35°2′21.38″N 135°43′43.33″E	Moss covered ground in front of trees and a golden pavilion in the distance.
Jōruri-ji Garden (浄瑠璃寺庭園, jōruri-ji teien)	1	—	—	Also a historic site (hist-crit.: 8)	Kizugawa, Kyoto; 34°42′56.16″N 135°52′22.8″E	
Saihō-ji Garden (西芳寺庭園, saihō-ji teien)	1	—	—	Also a historic site (hist-crit.: 8)	Kyoto, Kyoto; 34°59′32.5″N 135°41′3.81″E	Moss covered ground among trees in front of a pond.
Daisen-in Shoin Garden (大仙院書院庭園, daisenin shoin teien)	1	—	—	Also a historic site (hist-crit.: 8)	Kyoto, Kyoto; 35°2′40.66″N 135°44′45.01″E	Rock garden with raked gravel and large stones including one placed like a bridge.
Daitoku-ji Hōjō Garden (大徳寺方丈庭園, daitokuji hōjō teien)	1	—	—	Also a historic site (hist-crit.: 8)	Kyoto, Kyoto; 35°2′40.66″N 135°44′45.01″E	Rock garden with raked gravel and large standing stones in front of a small wall and green plants.
Daigo-ji Sanbō-in Garden (醍醐寺三宝院庭園, daigoji sanbōin teien)	1	8	—		Kyoto, Kyoto; 34°57′6.78″N 135°49′10.2″E	
Amanohashidate (天橋立)	3, 8, 11	—	—	One of the Three Views of Japan	Miyazu, Kyoto; 35°34′12.02″N 135°11′30.59″E	A narrow strip of sand covered in woods separating two bodies of water which are likely the sea and a lake.
Tenryū-ji Garden (天龍寺庭園, tenryū-ji teien)	1	—	—	Also a historic site (hist-crit.: 8)	Kyoto, Kyoto; 35°0′56.68″N 135°40′23.53″E	Raked gravel in front of a pond and a wooded hill.
Nijō Castle Ninomaru Palace Gardens (二条城二之丸庭園, nijōjō ninomaru teien)	1	—	—		Kyoto, Kyoto; 35°0′48.27″N 135°44′57.22″E	A pond with stones along the sides located in a garden with pine and other trees.
Hōkongō-in Seijo no taki waterfall and Mount Goisan (法金剛院青女滝 附 五位山, hōkongōin seijo no taki tsuketari goisan)	1, 10	—	—		Kyoto, Kyoto; 35°1′11.77″N 135°42′59.03″E	A small waterfall with little water among trees.
Hongan-ji Ōshoin Garden (本願寺大書院庭園, honganji ōshoin teien)	1	—	—	Also a historic site (hist-crit: 8)	Kyoto, Kyoto; 34°59′27.37″N 135°45′4.47″E	
Ryōan-ji Hōjō Garden (龍安寺方丈庭園, ryōanji hōjō teien)	1	—	—	Also a historic site (hist-crit: 8)	Kyoto, Kyoto; 35°2′3.81″N 135°43′5.42″E	A rectangular plot of raked gravel with islands of larger stone. The plot is bordered on two sides by a low wall.
Garden at the Eastern Heijō Palace (平城宮東院庭園, Heijō-kyū tōin teien)	1	—	—	Reconstruction of an 8th-century Imperial Palace Garden with ponds and pebble shore	Nara, Nara; 34°41′28″N 135°47′44″E	
Heijō-kyō Sakyō Sanjō Nibō Palace Garden (平城京左京三条二坊宮跡庭園, heijōkyō sakyō sanjō nibō miyaato teien)	1	2, 8	—	The ruins at the same site are a Special Historic Site.	Nara, Nara; 34°41′1.45″N 135°48′8.44″E	
Okayama Kōraku-en (岡山後楽園, okayama kōrakuen)	1	—	—	One of the Three Great Gardens of Japan	Okayama, Okayama; 34°40′3.94″N 133°56′7.78″E	Garden with dried grassland, plants, woods and a large pond with islands.
Genbaku Dome (formerly Hiroshima Prefectural Industrial Promotion Hall) (原爆ドーム（旧広島県産業奨励館）, genbaku dōmu kyū hiroshimaken sangyōshi)	2	—	—		Hiroshima, Hiroshima; 34°23′43.69″N 132°27′12.77″E	Destroyed building with cuppola.
Itsukushima (厳島)	8	2,3	—	Includes one of the Three Views of Japan	Hatsukaichi, Hiroshima; 34°17′1.99″N 132°19′5.9″E	Sea and wooded hills. There is a red pagoda on land and a red gate standing in the water.
Sandan-kyō ravine (三段峡, sandan-kyō)	3,5,6	—	—		Akiōta, Hiroshima; 34°37′28.85″N 132°11′8.97″E	A river with two small waterfalls in a wooded mountain landscape.
Ritsurin Garden (栗林公園, ritsurin kōen)	1	—	—		Takamatsu, Kagawa; 34°19′39.2″N 134°2′35.76″E	A pond with a bridge and islands in a park setting surrounded by wood and in front of a hill.
Nijinomatsubara (虹の松原)	3,9	—	—		Karatsu, Saga; 33°26′35.99″N 130°0′34.37″E	A forest stretching along the coastline.
Mount Unzen (雲仙岳, unzendake)	1, 3, 9, 10	—	—		Shimabara, Nagasaki; 32°45′37.54″N 130°17′31.25″E	Volcano with smoking rocky top and lower parts without vegetation.
Fukui cave (福井洞窟, fukui dōkutsu)	1	—	—		Sasebo, Nagasaki; 33°17′32.1″N 129°41′48.93″E	Small shrine inside a grottoe like cave.
Shikinaen Garden (識名園, shikinaen)	1	—	—		Naha, Okinawa; 26°12′14.1″N 127°42′55.32″E	A pond crossed by a stone causeway with a bridge. There is a low wooden house beyond the pond.
Lake Towada and Oirase Mountain Stream (十和田湖および奥入瀬渓流, towadako oyobi oirasekeiryū)	6, 7	—	—	Also a Natural Monument (4)	Towadako, Aomori and Kosaka, Akita; 40°28′23.05″N 140°52′39.67″E	A lake bordered by wooded slopes. A stream through a green forest.
Dorohacchō Gorge (瀞八丁, dorohacchō)	5,6	—	—	Also a Natural Monument (3.1)	Kumanogawa, Wakayama, Kiwa, Mie and Totsukawa, Nara; 33°52′23.24″N 135°51′27.43″E	
Mount Fuji (富士山, fujisan)	10	—	—		Yamanashi, Shizuoka; 35°21′28.8″N 138°43′51.6″E	Perfectly shaped volcano with the upper half covered in snow.
Goryōkaku site (五稜郭跡, goryōkakuato)	—	2	—	Star fort of the Republic of Ezo	Hakodate, Hokkaidō; 41°47′49.8″N 140°45′24.3″E	Bird eye view on a star shaped fortress with surrounding water filled moat.
Sannai-Maruyama Site (三内丸山遺跡, Sannai Maruyama iseki)	—	1	—	Jōmon period archaeological site	Aomori, Aomori; 40°48′40.24″N 140°41′44.3″E	A long very basic wooden house with thatched roof. Behind the house there is a wooden three-storied structure with open floors supported by large pillars.
Chūson-ji compound (中尊寺境内, chūsonji keidai)	—	3	—		Hiraizumi, Iwate; 39°0′6.68″N 141°6′0.46″E	A building with pyramid shaped roof at the end of a flight of stairs.
Muryōkōin site (無量光院跡, muryōkōinato)	—	3	—		Hiraizumi, Iwate; 38°59′36.08″N 141°6′56.81″E	Very small remains of foundations.
Site of a Chinjusha attached to the Mōtsū-ji compound (毛越寺境内 附 鎮守社跡, mōtsūji keidai tsuketari chinjushaato)	—	3	—		Hiraizumi, Iwate; 38°59′13.89″N 141°6′27.26″E	Very small remains of foundations.
Site of a temple attached to the site of the Taga Castle (多賀城跡 附 寺跡, tagajōato tsuketari teraato)	—	2, 3	—		Tagajō, Miyagi; 38°17′57.54″N 140°59′52.41″E	A low stone platform in a meadow.
Ōyu Stone Circle (大湯環状列石, ōyu kanjō resseki)	—	1	—		Kazuno, Akita; 40°16′16.96″N 140°48′15.06″E	A circle on the ground made of stones.
Former Kōdōkan School (旧弘道館, kyūkōdōkan)	—	4	—	Former school of the Mito Clan, founded in 1841 by Tokugawa Nariaki	Mito, Ibaraki; 36°22′31.54″N 140°28′38.27″E	A wooden house with white walls and a gabled roof.
Hitachi Kokubun-ji site (常陸国分寺跡, hitachi kokubunjiato)	—	3	—		Ishioka, Ibaraki; 36°11′48.17″N 140°16′25.38″E	Site of the Lecture Hall of Hitachi Provincial Temple
Hitachi Kokubun Nunnery site (常陸国分尼寺跡, hitachi kokubun nijiato)	—	3	—		Ishioka, Ibaraki; 36°12′6.18″N 140°16′3.25″E	
Ōya Magaibutsu (大谷磨崖仏, ōya magaibutsu)	—	3	—	Stone reliefs of Buddhist deities in a cave	Utsunomiya, Tochigi; 36°35′46.35″N 139°49′16.94″E	
Cedar Avenue of Nikkō and attached donation monuments (日光杉並木街道 附 並木寄進碑, nikkō suginamiki kaidō tsuketari namiki kishinhi)	—	6	2.1	Three roads totalling 37 km (23 mi)	Nikkō, Imaichi and Kanuma, Tochigi; 36°35′46.35″N 139°49′16.94″E	Tall cedar trees next to a modern road. A stone stele with square cross section surrounded by a stone fence.
Kanaizawa Stele (金井沢碑, kanaizawahi)	—	3, 7	—	110 cm (43 in) high stone stele from 726	Takasaki, Gunma; 36°17′8.37″N 139°0′58.21″E	Rubbed copy showing Chinese characters.
Yamanoue stele and kofun (山上碑及び古墳, yamanouehi oyobi kofun)	—	1, 7	—		Takasaki, Gunma; 36°16′37.48″N 139°1′40.09″E	Rubbed copy showing Chinese characters.
Tago Stele (多胡碑, tagohi)	—	2, 7	—		Takasaki, Gunma; 36°15′54.1″N 138°59′46.67″E	Rubbed copy showing Chinese characters.
Edo Castle site (江戸城跡, edojōato)	—	2	—		Tokyo; 35°41′8.93″N 139°45′23.95″E	Stone foundations.
Kasori Shell Mound (加曽利貝塚, Kasori Kaizuka)	—	1	—	Mid to late Jōmon period shell mound. Largest shell heap in Japan.	Wakaba Ward, Chiba, Chiba, Chiba; 35°37′24″N 140°9′53″E	Heap of various sized whiteish shells.
Ichijōdani Asakura Family Historic Ruins (一乗谷朝倉氏遺跡, Ichijōdani Asakura-shi iseki)	—	2, 3, 6, 7, 8	—	The gardens at the same site are a Special Place of Scenic Beauty.	Fukui, Fukui; 35°59′57.95″N 136°17′43.52″E	Small Chinese style wooden gate in a wall of rough stones.
Togari Ishi Stone Age ruins (尖石石器時代遺跡, togariishi sekkijidai iseki)	—	1	—	Jōmon period archaeological site	Chino, Nagano; 36°0′46.32″N 138°13′55.04″E	
Tōtomi Kokubun-ji site (遠江国分寺跡, tōtomi kokubunjiato)	—	3	—		Iwata, Shizuoka; 34°43′10.45″N 137°51′5.75″E	
Arai Barrier site (新居関跡, arainosekiato)	—	6	—	Set up by Tokugawa Ieyasu	Arai, Shizuoka; 34°41′40.99″N 137°33′40.82″E	A wide wooden building with a large roof beyond a wooden fence.
Toro archaeological site (登呂遺跡, toro iseki)	—	1	—	Late Yayoi archaeological site	Shizuoka, Shizuoka; 34°57′22.26″N 138°24′29.74″E	Simple thatched hut with the thatching going all the way to the ground.
Nagoya Castle site (名古屋城跡, nagoyajōato)	—	2	—		Nagoya, Aichi; 35°11′5.8″N 136°53′58.77″E	Remains of stone foundations in front of a Japanese castle.
Former residence of Motoori Norinaga (本居宣長旧宅 同 宅跡, Motoori Norinaga kyūtaku dōtakuato)	—	8	—		Matsusaka, Mie; 34°34′30.9″N 136°31′32.94″E	Interior of a Japanese house with tatami floor and sliding doors.
Azuchi Castle site (安土城跡, azuchijōato)	—	2	—		Azuchi and Higashiōmi, Shiga; 35°9′21.25″N 136°8′21.79″E	
Hikone Castle site (彦根城跡, hikonejōato)	—	2	—		Hikone, Shiga; 35°16′35.87″N 136°15′9.02″E	Tenshu.
Kuni-kyō (Yamashiro Kokubun-ji site) (恭仁宮跡 (山城国分寺跡), kunikyūseki yamashirokokubunji-ato)	—	2	—	capital of Japan between 740 and 744	Kizugawa, Kyoto; 34°45′55.67″N 135°51′46.64″E	Kuni-kyo
Osaka Castle site (大坂城跡, osakajōato)	—	2	—		Osaka, Osaka; 34°41′14.3″N 135°31′35.04″E	Osaka Castle.
Kudara-dera site (百済寺跡, kuderaderaato)	—	3	—		Hirakata, Osaka; 34°48′55.29″N 135°39′39.15″E	A low earthen platform.
Himeji Castle site (姫路城跡, himejijōato)	—	2	—		Himeji, Hyōgo; 34°50′18.85″N 134°41′34.97″E	View from a high building over wooded lands with many structures.
Kitora Tomb (キトラ古墳, kitora kofun)	—	1	—		Asuka, Nara; 34°27′5.25″N 135°48′18.49″E	Wooded hillock and a small stone wall.
Takamatsuzuka Tomb (高松塚古墳, takamatsuzuka kofun)	—	1	—		Asuka, Nara; 34°27′43.94″N 135°48′23.2″E	Wooden entrance to a little hill.
Yama-dera site (山田寺跡, yamadaderaato)	—	3	—		Sakurai, Nara; 34°29′4.02″N 135°49′48.09″E	Modern stele with Japanese characters next to a raised platform.
Ishibutai Kofun (石舞台古墳)	—	1	—		Asuka, Nara; 34°28′0.15″N 135°49′33.88″E	Two huge and a couple of smaller rocks.
Suyama Kofun (巣山古墳)	—	1	—		Kōryō, Nara; 34°33′23.06″N 135°44′27.63″E	
Fujiwara Palace site (藤原宮跡, fujiwara kyūseki)	—	2	—	Palace of the Fujiwara capital	Kashihara, Nara; 34°30′8.71″N 135°48′26.44″E	Fujiwara Palace Ruins
Monjuin Nishi Kofun (文殊院西古墳)	—	1	—		Sakurai, Nara; 34°30′13.55″N 135°50′33.21″E	Entrance to an underground structure built of rough stones.
Heijō Palace site (平城宮跡, heijō kyūseki)	—	2	—	Palace of the Heijō capital; the gardens at the same site are a Special Place of Scenic Beauty	Nara, Nara; 34°41′28.46″N 135°47′42.02″E	Birds eye view of a palace with several large structures surrounded by a rectangular corridor.
Moto Yakushi-ji site (本薬師寺跡, motoyakushijiato)	—	3	—	Yakushi-ji of the Fujiwara capital	Kashihara, Nara; 34°29′33.88″N 135°48′0.95″E	
Iwase Senzuka Kofun Group (岩橋千塚古墳群, iwase senzuka kofungun)	—	1	—		Wakayama, Wakayama; 34°13′33.08″N 135°13′38.9″E	A gravel path and hillocks.
Sai no Ohai-ji site (斎尾廃寺跡, sainoohaijiato)	—	3	—		Tōhaku, Tottori; 35°28′53.65″N 133°42′41.13″E	
Former Shizutani School with Camelia mound, stone gate, site of the residence of Tsuda Nagatada and tea house (旧閑谷学校 附 椿山石門津田永忠宅跡および黄葉亭, kyūshizutanigakkō tsuketari tsubakiyama sekimon tsudanagatadatakuato oyobi kōyōtei)	—	4	—		Bizen, Okayama; 34°47′46.77″N 134°13′10.23″E	A fenced mound beyond a thick forest. Two short stone columns placed about two meters apart in the ground. Small hut with thatched pyramid shaped roof amongst trees. Stone foundations and a wooded hill.
Renjuku Fourmer Chazan Kan house (廉塾ならびに菅茶山旧宅, renjuku narabini kansazankyūtaku)	—	4, 8	—	Chazan Kan (1748–1827) was a Confucian scholar.	Fukuyama, Hiroshima; 34°32′41.26″N 133°23′4.1″E	
Sanuki Kokubun-ji site (讃岐国分寺跡, sanuki kokubunjiato)	—	3	—	Temple 80 of the Shikoku pilgrimage	Takamatsu, Kagawa; 34°18′13.18″N 133°56′39.65″E	Large stones set in the ground in front of temple buildings.
Ōzuka Kofun (王塚古墳)	—	1	—		Keisen, Fukuoka; 33°35′19.47″N 130°39′49.84″E	A mound with a gate covered by grass.
Mizuki site (水城跡, mizukiato)	—	2	—	Low embankment built in 664 by the Dazaifu (大宰府), the imperial office governing Kyūshū, against an invasion from Tang dynasty China and Korea	Dazaifu, Kasuga and Ōnojō, Fukuoka; 33°31′2.41″N 130°29′28.42″E	
Dazaifu site (大宰府跡, dazaifuato)	—	2	—	Ruins of the governmental office with jurisdiction over Kyūshū	Dazaifu, Fukuoka; 33°30′52.43″N 130°30′54.55″E	Modern stele in front of a park-like area.
Ōnojō Castle Ruins (大野城跡, ōnojōato)	—	2, 3	—	Asuka period castle	Dazaifu, Umi and Ōnojō, Fukuoka; 33°31′16.9″N 130°30′54.01″E	Wall of unhewn stones.
Yoshinogari site (吉野ヶ里遺跡, yoshinogari iseki)	—	1	—	Yayoi period archaeological site	Yoshinogari, Saga; 33°19′25.18″N 130°23′6.43″E	Two simple houses with thatched roofs almost going down to the ground.
Nagoya Castle ruined foundations (名護屋城跡並陣跡, nagoyajōato narabini jinato)	—	2	—		Chinzei, Yobuko and Genkai, Saga; 33°31′48.65″N 129°52′9.75″E	Hill with remains of stone foundations. In the distant background there is the see.
Kaneda Castle site (金田城跡, kanedajōato)	—	2	—	Asuka period mountain castle	Tsushima, Nagasaki; 34°16′6.07″N 129°18′49.69″E	
Haru no Tsuji Site (原の辻遺跡, haru no tsujii seki)	—	1	—		Iki, Nagasaki; 33°45′48.68″N 129°44′55.04″E	
Kumamoto Castle site (熊本城跡, kumamotojōato)	—	2	—		Kumamoto, Kumamoto; 32°48′20.55″N 130°42′21.21″E	
Usuki Stone Buddhas with five-storied stone pagoda and two gorintō with inscriptions from 1170 and 1172 (臼杵磨崖仏 附 日吉塔、嘉応二年在銘五輪塔 承安二年在銘五輪塔, usuki magaibutsu tsuketari hiyoshitō kaōninenzaimei gorintō jōanninenzaimei gorintō)	—	3	—		Usuki, Ōita; 33°5′26.18″N 131°45′47.04″E	
Saitobaru Burial Mounds (西都原古墳群, saitobaru kofun-guni)	—	1	—		Saito, Miyazaki; 32°7′14.95″N 131°23′17.84″E	Grass covered hillock with an entrance.
Kii Castle site (基肄（椽）城跡, kiijōato)	—	2	—		Chikushino, Fukuoka and Kiyama, Saga; 33°26′39.34″N 130°30′36.09″E	
Mount Apoi alpine plant community (アポイ岳高山植物群落, apoidake kōzanshokubutsu gunraku)	—	—	2.3		Samani, Hokkaidō; 42°6′25.35″N 143°1′41.89″E	
Marimo of Lake Akan (阿寒湖のマリモ, akanko no marimo)	—	—	2.12, 2.8		Akan, Hokkaidō; 43°27′1.54″N 144°5′57.93″E	Large green balls of a plant under water.
Showashinzan (昭和新山)	—	—	3.10		Sōbetsu, Hokkaidō; 42°32′37.17″N 140°51′51.77″E	Rocky mountain colored red among green landscape.
Daisetsuzan (大雪山)	—	—	4		Kamikawa, Higashikawa, Biei and Shintoku, Hokkaidō; 43°40′58.87″N 142°53′55.78″E	Flat valley or caldera with patches of snow.
Nopporo Forest Park (野幌原始林, nopporo genshirin)	—	—	2.2		Kitahiroshima, Hokkaidō; 43°3′12.46″N 141°30′3.09″E	Lake in a forest.
Swans on Kominato beach and their wintering place (小湊のハクチョウおよびその渡来地, kominato no hakuchō oyobi sono toraichi)	—	—	1.2	Whooper swans	Asadokoro, Hiranai, Aomori; 40°56′14.09″N 140°58′23.88″E	
Getō Onsen Tufa (夏油温泉の石灰華, getō onsen no sekkaika)	—	—	3.8		Kitakami, Iwate; 39°12′36.64″N 140°52′55.74″E	
Nesori petrified wood (根反の大珪化木, nesori no daikeikaboku)	—	—	3.1	15–20 million years old	Ichinohe, Iwate; 40°11′24.78″N 141°20′4.42″E	
Yakehashiri lava flow (焼走り熔岩流, yakehashiri yōganryū)	—	—	3.5, 3.10		Nishine, Iwate; 39°52′30.82″N 141°2′51.16″E	
Mount Hayachine and Yakushidake alpine zone, forest vegetation (早池峰山および薬師岳の高山帯・森林植物群落, hayachinesan oyobi yakushidake no kōzantai shinrin shokubutsugunraku)	—	—	2.3		Hanamaki, Tōno and Kawai, Iwate; 39°31′53.71″N 141°28′26.53″E	
onikōbe no megama oyobi ogama kanketsu onsen (鬼首の雌釜および雄釜間歇温泉)	—	—	3.8		Ōsaki, Miyagi; 38°48′0.19″N 140°38′52.81″E	
Tamagawa Hot Spring hokutolite (玉川温泉の北投石, tamagawa onsen no hokutōseki)	—	—	3.1, 3.8	Hokutolite is a type of radioactive baryte.	Semboku, Akita; 39°57′42.57″N 140°43′42.18″E	
Mount Haguro cedar avenue (羽黒山のスギ並木, hagursan no suginamiki)	—	—	2.1		Tsuruoka, Yamagata; 38°42′13.91″N 139°58′13.33″E	A stone mountain path through a forest of very large cedar trees.
Large zelkova tree of Higashine (東根の大ケヤキ, higashine no ōkeyaki)	—	—	2.1	More than 1000 years old, and perimeter larger than 12 (m), largest zelkova tree in Japan	Higashine, Yamagata; 38°26′31.16″N 140°24′6.28″E	
Natural habitat Pinguicula ramosa (コウシンソウ自生地, higashine no ōkeyaki)	—	—	2.12	A species of butterwort endemic to Nikkō National Park	Nikkō, Tochigi; 36°40′27.13″N 139°21′42.9″E	A small plant with light green leaves and blue whitish flowers growing on a tree trunk.
Mount Asama lava tree mold (浅間山熔岩樹型, asamayama yōganjukei)	—	—	3.2, 3.7, 3.10		Tsumagoi, Gunma; 36°26′53.57″N 138°30′56.25″E	
Sakitama Kofun Group (埼玉古墳群, sakitama kofungun)	—	1	—	A large group of kofun comprising Maruhakayama Kofun, Futagoyama Kofun, Teppōyama Kofun, Shogunyama Kofun, Nakanoyama Kofun, Kawarazuka Kofun, Okunoyama Kofun, Atagoyama Kofun and Inariyama Kofun whose artifacts have been designated as National Treasure of Japan.	Gyōda, Saitama; 36°7′37″N 139°28′44″E	
Wisteria at Ushijima (牛島のフジ, ushijima no fuji)	—	—	2.1		Kasukabe, Saitama; 35°59′5.83″N 139°46′24.07″E	
Kagami-iwa rock at Mount Mitake (御獄の鏡岩, mitake no kagamiiwa)	—	—	3.1, 3.5		Kamikawa, Saitama; 36°10′45.91″N 139°4′14.18″E	
Tajimagahara Primula sieboldii primrose habitat (田島ヶ原サクラソウ自生地, tajimagahara sakurasō jiseichi)	—	—	2.4		Saitama, Saitama; 35°50′17.41″N 139°36′56.66″E	Tajimagahara Primula sieboldii primrose habitat
Tai-no-ura sea bream habitat (鯛の浦タイ生息地, tai no ura tai seisokuchi)	—	—	1.3		Kamogawa, Chiba; 35°7′5.98″N 140°11′28.67″E	
Ōshima cherry tree (大島のサクラ株, ōshima no sakurakabu)	—	—	2.1	Single tree, 7.9 m (26 ft) circumference; species is native to Ōshima and Izu Peninsula	Ōshima, Tokyo; 34°45′49.01″N 139°26′3.07″E	
Firefly squid sea surface group (ホタルイカ群遊海面, hotaruika-gun yūkaimen)	—	—	1.3		Toyama and Uozu, Toyama; 36°46′36.01″N 137°20′40.69″E	
Uozu buried forest (魚津埋没林, uozu maibutsurin)	—	—	3.1, 3.5	Tree trunks of a cedar forest partially buried about 2000 years ago; largest has a circumference of c. 12 m (39 ft)	Shakadō, Uozu, Toyama; 36°49′31.5″N 137°24′23.53″E	
Yakushidake cirque group (薬師岳の圏谷群, yakushidake no kenkokugun)	—	—	3.11		Toyama, Toyama; 36°28′5.64″N 137°32′38.48″E	
Sinter cones (岩間の噴泉塔群, iwama no funsentōgun)	—	—	3.8		Hakusan, Ishikawa; 36°13′39.32″N 136°46′11.69″E	
Narusawa lava tree mold (鳴沢熔岩樹型, narusawayōganjukei)	—	—	3.6, 3.10		Narusawa, Yamanashi; 35°25′34.06″N 138°42′3.05″E	
Shirahone Onsen stalagmite and spherical limestones (白骨温泉の噴湯丘と球状石灰石, shirahone onsen no funtōkyū to kyūjōsekkaiseki)	—	—	3.8		Matsumoto, Nagano; 36°8′51.72″N 137°37′28.85″E	
Neodani Fault (根尾谷断層, neodani dansō)	—	—	3.5		Motosu, Gifu; 35°37′1.62″N 136°37′14.98″E	
Itoshiro cedar (石徹白のスギ, itoshiro no sugi)	—	—	2.1	Circumference 14 m (46 ft)	Gujō, Gifu; 36°0′5.83″N 136°46′18.49″E	
Kariyado gebazakura (狩宿の下馬ザクラ, kariyado no gebazakura)	—	—	2.1	Oldest tree of the mountain sakura, crown 21.81 m (71.6 ft) (EW) and 16.33 m (53.6 ft) (NS)	Fujinomiya, Shizuoka; 35°18′6.92″N 138°35′19.59″E	
Wakutama pond (湧玉池, wakutama no ike)	—	—	3.10		Fujinomiya, Shizuoka; 35°13′38.07″N 138°36′41.14″E	Pond with a stone inside and a red bridge crossing it.
Nagaoka fireflies and their habitat (長岡のゲンジボタルおよびその発生地, nagaoka no genjibotaru oyobi sono hassei)	—	—	1.2		Maibara, Shiga; 35°21′22.54″N 136°22′4.84″E	
Kasugayama Primeval Forest (春日山原始林, kasugayama genshirin)	—	—	2.2	Part of the World Heritage Site "Historic Monuments of Ancient Nara"	Nara, Nara; 34°40′56.19″N 135°51′46.13″E	
Daisen agarwood single species forest (大山のダイセンキャラボク純林, daisen no daisenkyaraboku junrin)	—	—	2.2		Daisen, Tottori; 35°29′0.95″N 133°30′28.51″E	
Daikon Island lava tubes (大根島の熔岩隧道, daikonjima no yōganzuidō)	—	—	3.6, 3.10		Matsue, Shimane; 35°29′42.59″N 133°10′34.42″E	
Akiyoshi plateau (秋吉台, akiyoshidai)	—	—	3.1, 3.3, 3.6, 3.9	Karst topography	Mine, Yamaguchi; 34°14′11.14″N 131°17′26.05″E	Landscape of brown hills with many scattered rocks.
Akiyoshi cave (秋芳洞, akiyoshidō)	—	—	3.6, 3.9	At 8.7 km (5.4 mi) second longest cave in Japan	Mine, Yamaguchi; 34°13′40.17″N 131°18′12.32″E	The Hyakumaizara in Akiyoshi cave.
Cranes at Yashiro and their wintering place (八代のツルおよびその渡来地, yashiro no tsuru oyobi sono toraichi)	—	—	1.2	Hooded cranes	Shūnan and Kudamatsu, Yamaguchi; 34°5′56.19″N 131°56′49.83″E	
Giant camphor tree in Kamo (加茂の大クス, kamo no ōkusu)	—	—	2.1		Higashimiyoshi, Tokushima; 34°2′27.39″N 133°55′54.92″E	
Chinese juniper at Hōshō-in (宝生院のシンパク, hōshōin no shinpaku)	—	—	2.1	23 m (75 ft) high, 15 m (49 ft) circumference at ground level	Tonoshō, Kagawa; 34°29′36.11″N 134°11′49.86″E	
Yakama potholes (八釜の甌穴群, yakama no ōketsugun)	—	—	3.9		Kumakōgen, Ehime; 33°42′13.6″N 132°57′38.39″E	
Common jay at Kōchi and its habitat (高知市のミカドアゲハおよびその生息地, kōchishi no mikadoageha oyobi sono seisokuchi)	—	—	1.2		Kōchi, Kōchi; 33°33′13.06″N 133°32′24.07″E	
Giant cedars at Sugi (杉の大スギ, sugi no ōsugi)	—	—	2.1	Two stems, each about 16 m (52 ft) circumference	Ōtoyo, Kōchi; 33°45′20.17″N 133°39′47.01″E	
Japanese Box primeval forest at Mount Kosho (古処山ツゲ原始林, koshosan tsuge genshirin)	—	—	2.1		Asakura and Kama, Fukuoka; 33°28′54.67″N 130°43′29.8″E	
Camphor tree primeval forest at Mount Tachibana (立花山クスノキ原始林, tachibanayama kusunoki genshirin)	—	—	2.2, 2.10		Shingū and Hisayama, Fukuoka; 33°40′45.67″N 130°28′6.23″E	
Mucuna sempervirens at Aira (相良のアイラトビカズラ, aira no airatobikazura)	—	—	2.1, 2.12		Kikuka, Kumamoto; 33°3′51.16″N 130°46′5.53″E	
Aoshima subtropical plant communities (青島亜熱帯性植物群落, aoshima anettai seishokubutsugunraku)	—	—	2.2		Aoshima, Miyazaki, Miyazaki; 31°48′18.69″N 131°28′32.7″E	
Sago palm natural habitat at Cape Toi (都井岬ソテツ自生地, toimisaki sotetsu jiseichi)	—	—	2.10		Kushima, Miyazaki; 31°21′54.78″N 131°20′24.03″E	
Mitrastema at Uchiumi (内海のヤッコソウ発生地, uchiumi no yakkosō hasseichi)	—	—	2.12	Mitrastema yamamotoi	Miyazaki, Miyazaki; 31°44′28.97″N 131°28′3.81″E	
Yakushima primeval cedar forest (屋久島スギ原始林, yakushima sugi genshirin)	—	—	2.2	Includes with the Jōmon Sugi, the oldest specimen of Cryptomeria japonica	Yakushima, Kagoshima; 30°19′40.23″N 130°31′23.06″E	
Kamō camphor tree (蒲生のクス, kamō no kesu)	—	—	2.1	Height: 30 m (98 ft), circumference: 24 m (79 ft)	Kamō, Kagoshima; 31°45′44.38″N 130°34′11.77″E	
Origin of Kandelia obovata at Kiire (喜入のリュウキュウコウガイ産地, kiire no ryūkyōkōgai sanchi)	—	—	2.10		Kagoshima, Kagoshima; 31°22′29.34″N 130°32′49.26″E	
Natural habitat of the sago palm in Kagoshima Prefecture (鹿児島県のソテツ自生地, kagoshimaken no sotetsu jiseichi)	—	—	2.10		Yamagawa, Bonotsu, Sata and Uchinoura, Kagoshima; 31°21′13.09″N 130°42′15.64″E	
Cranes in Kagoshima Prefecture and their wintering place (鹿児島県のツルおよびその渡来地, kagoshimaken no tsuru oyobi sono toraichi)	—	—	1.2	Hooded cranes	Izumi, Kagoshima; 32°6′9.52″N 130°16′25.75″E	
Birōjima subtropical plant communities (枇榔島亜熱帯性植物群落, birōjima anettai seishokubutsugunraku)	—	—	2.2, 2.10		Shibushi, Kagoshima; 31°25′45.3″N 131°7′1.89″E	
Shirouma mountain range alpine plant zone (白馬連山高山植物帯, shiroumarenzan kōzanshokubutsutai)	—	—	2.3		Asahi and Kurobe in Toyama; Hakuba in Nagano; Itoigawa in Niigata; 36°38′56.9″N 137°44′55.73″E	
Ozegahara (尾瀬, oze)	—	—	4		Yunotani, Niigata; Katashina, Gunma; Hinoemata, Fukushima; 36°56′33.93″N 139°13′59.41″E	View from a mountain on a wide valley with light green areas bordered by dark green forest.
Short-tailed albatross (アホウドリ, ahōdori)	—	—	1.2		Ogasawara Islands (Tokyo) and Okinawa	A mainly white bird with some black feathers at the wings and some rust color around the neck and the back of the neck.
Amami rabbit (アマミノクロウサギ, amami no kuro usagi)	—	—	1.1		Tokunoshima and Amami Ōshima, Kagoshima	A stuffed rabbit.
Iriomote cat (イリオモテヤマネコ, iriomote yamaneko)	—	—	1.1	Endemic to one island (Iriomote)	Iriomote, Okinawa	A stuffed cat.
Japanese giant salamander (オオサンショウウオ, ōsanshōuo)	—	—	1.2	At up to 1.5 m (4 ft 11 in) length, the second largest salamander in the world	11 prefectures, among others: Gifu, Mie, Hyōgo, Hiroshima, Shimane, Tottori, Ōita	A red-brownish salamander with black spots under water.
Japanese serow (カモシカ, kamoshika)	—	—	1.1	found on all main Japanese islands except for Hokkaidō	29 prefectures including Aomori	Two lying goat-antelopes with black rumps and white heads.
Otter (カワウソ, kawauso)	—	—	1.2		various	A stuffed otter.
Crested serpent-eagle (カンムリワシ, kanmuriwashi)	—	—	1.1		Okinawa	O-kanmuriwashi.
Oriental stork (コウノトリ, kō no tori)	—	—	1.2		Hyōgo and Fukui	A black and white stork with red legs and a black beak.
Red-crowned crane (タンチョウ, tanchō)	—	—	1.2		Hokkaidō	A black and white crane with a red crown.
Crested ibis (トキ, toki)	—	—	1.2		Niigata and Ishikawa	A stuffed white ibis with red legs and face and a black beak.
Okinawa woodpecker (ノグチゲラ, noguchigera)	—	—	1.1	Endemic to Okinawa Island	Okinawa Island, Okinawa	
Bonin white-eye (メグロ, meguro)	—	—	1.1	Endemic to the Bonin Islands	Bonin Islands, Tokyo	
Rock ptarmigan (ライチョウ, raichō)	—	—	1.2		Toyama, Nagano, Niigata, Yamanashi, Shizuoka, Gifu	Two grouses with white lower part and brown upper part.
Long-tailed fowl of Tosa (土佐のオナガドリ, tosa no onagadori)	—	—	1.4		Nankoku, Kōchi	
