= Ganban'yoku =

Japanese heated rock bathing

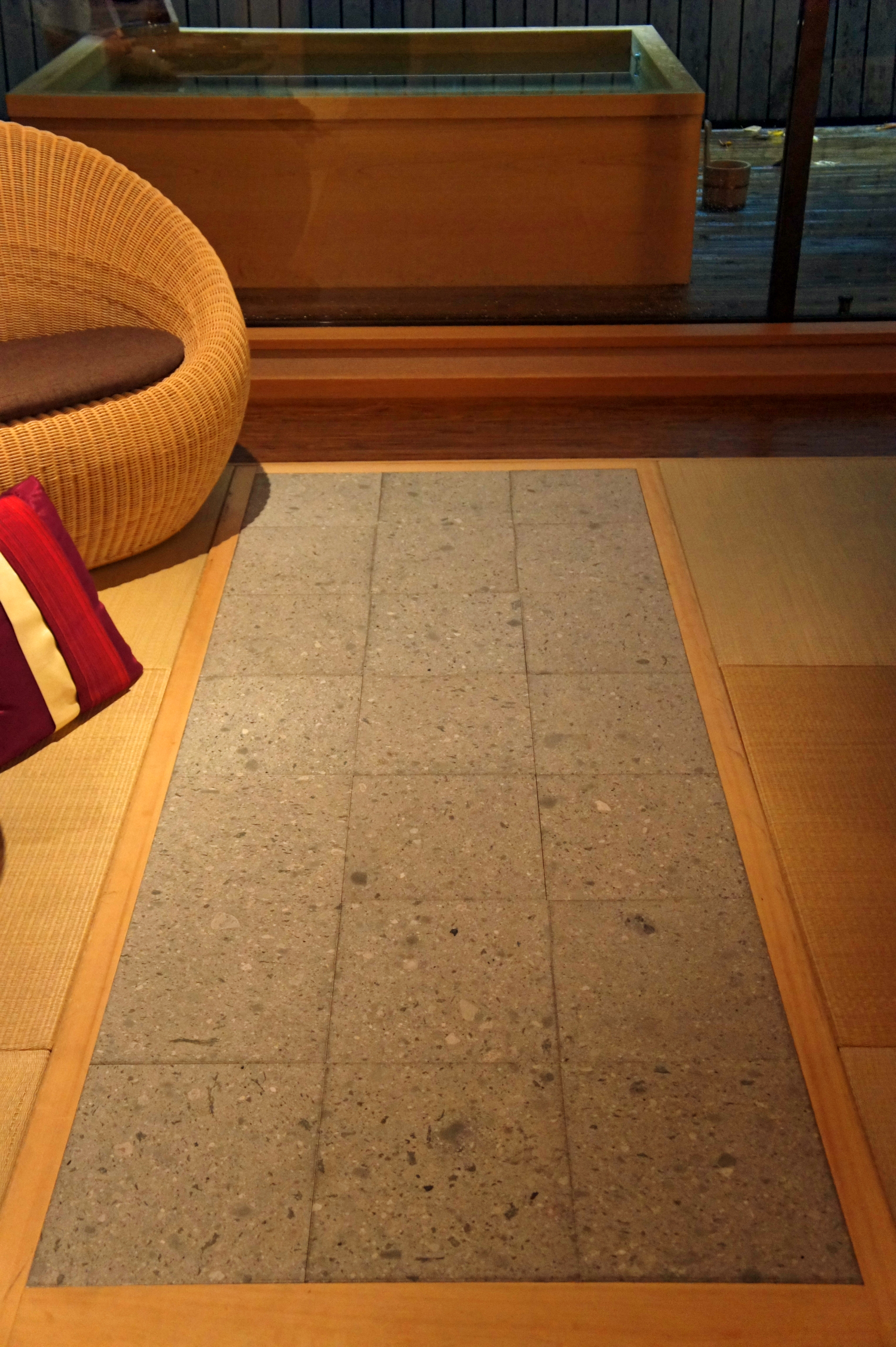
Ganban'yoku in Kagawa Prefecture

Ganban'yoku (岩盤浴) is a Japanese bathing method in which an individual lies on heated natural stones in a humid room which itself is usually heated to between 40-50°C (104-122°F). The use of ganban'yoku is believed to have positive effects on both health and beauty.

== History ==
Tamagawa Onsen in Akita Prefecture is said to be the birthplace of ganban'yoku bathing in Japan. At Tamagawa Onsen, visitors can lie on exposed geothermally heated hokutolite stones. The first specialized ganban'yoku facility opened in Kesennuma, Miyagi Prefecture in 2001. From there, ganban'yoku facilities began opening throughout Japan in what has been referred to as a ganban'yoku "boom." Although the number of locations specializing only in ganban'yoku has decreased since the boom due to hygiene concerns, ganban'yoku rooms attached to onsen facilities can still be found throughout Japan.

== Ganban'yoku bathing ==
Body-sized stones, such as germanium, are installed into the floor of a room which is usually heated to around 40-50°C (104-122°F). Bathers, usually dressed in kannaigi (館内着) which is a type of casual Japanese indoor wear similar to samue, place a bath towel on a stone and lie on it. The stones themselves are heated. The room's temperature, which is similar to that of a low-temperature sauna, combined with the heat of the stone cause users to sweat.

Like low-temperature saunas, ganban'yoku are commonly advertised to have a detoxification effect, improve the circulatory system, and be good for the skin. It is also considered to have a relaxing and stress-reducing effect.

Most modern ganban'yoku rooms are located at onsen facilities. As clothing is worn in the ganban'yoku rooms, they are separate from the nude bathing area and are mixed-gender. The onsen bathing area is usually visited after one uses a ganban'yoku in order to wash off the sweat caused by the warm room and stones.
