= Yukata =

Casual summer kimono

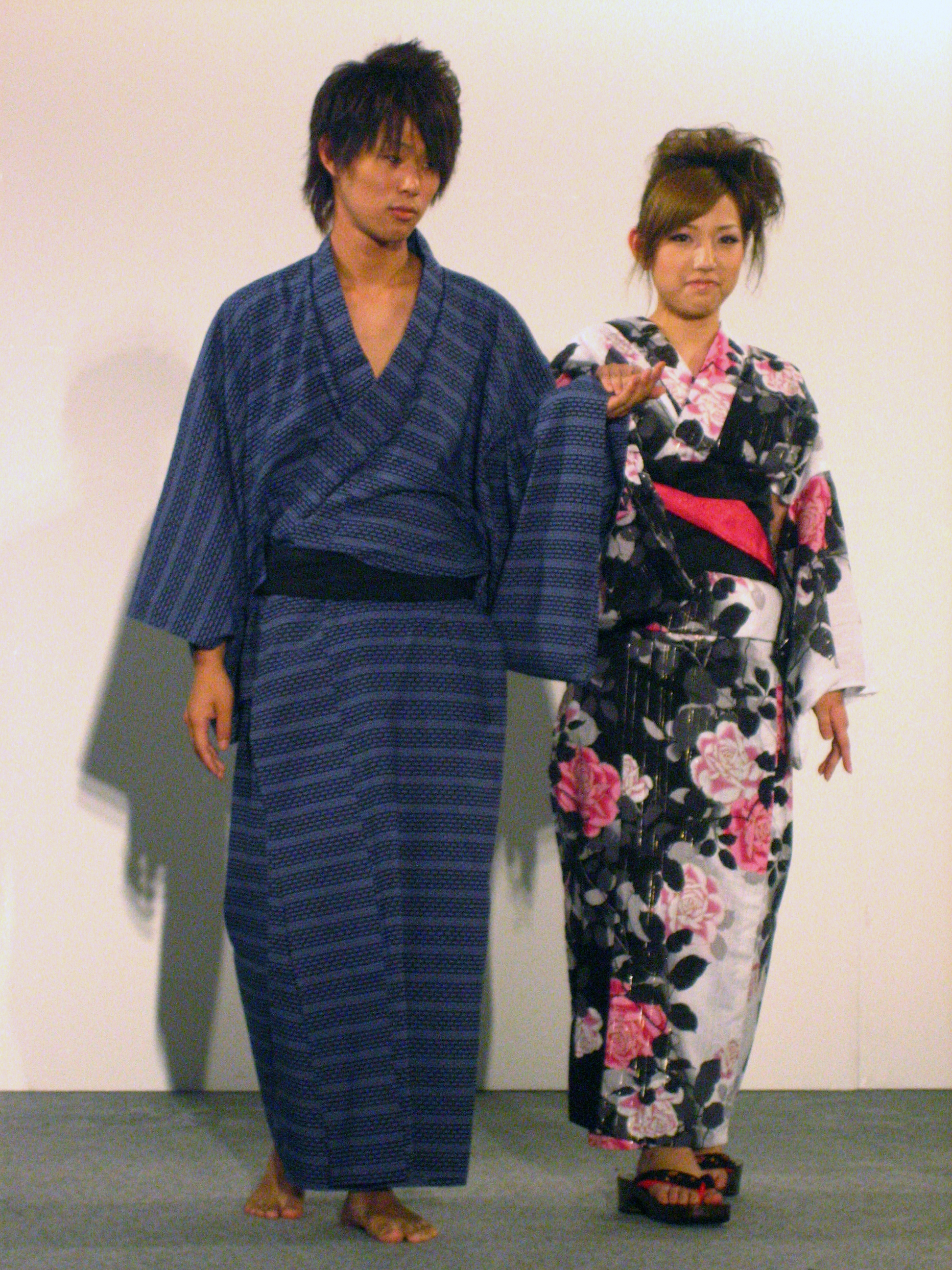
- Men's and women's yukata
- Type: Casual summer kimono
- Place of origin: Japan

A yukata (浴衣, lit. 'bathrobe') is an unlined cotton or linen summer kimono, worn in casual settings such as summer festivals and to nearby bathhouses. The name is translated literally as "bathing cloth" and yukata originally were worn as bathrobes; their modern use is much broader, and are a common sight in Japan during summer. Though yukata are traditionally indigo and white in colour, modern yukata commonly feature multicoloured designs, and are designed to be machine washable. They are similar in appearance to the nemaki, a unisex short-sleeved kimono-like garment worn by guests at traditional inns.

== Techniques and textiles ==
Yukata are made using various textiles and dyeing techniques, often cotton but also linen or synthetic fabrics. Traditionally they were made with a technique called Nagaita-Chugata, where fabric was dyed on both sides with stencils. As this technique is expensive, a technique called Chusen was developed in the late Edo period to replicate the double sided cloth.

== Construction and wear ==
Yukata are worn by men and women. Like other forms of traditional Japanese clothing, yukata are made with straight seams and wide sleeves. Men's yukata are distinguished by the shorter sleeve extension of approximately 10 centimetres (3.9 in) from the armpit seam, compared to the longer 20 centimetres (7.9 in) sleeve extension in women's yukata. A standard yukata ensemble consists of a yukata, obi, and a type of sandal known as a geta, worn without socks. The outfit may be accessorised with a foldable or fixed hand fan and the addition of a traditional carry bag known as a kinchaku, used by both men and women to carry mobile phones and other small personal items.

As with all kimono, the proper left side of the yukata is wrapped over the proper right side, and secured with either a stiff, one-layer obi, or a softer, also one-layer obi. An outer jacket may be added for cool weather.

Traditionally, yukata were mostly made of indigo-dyed cotton; however, since an increase in popularity in the late 1990s, a wide variety of colours and designs are now available, worn by both men and women.

== Customs ==
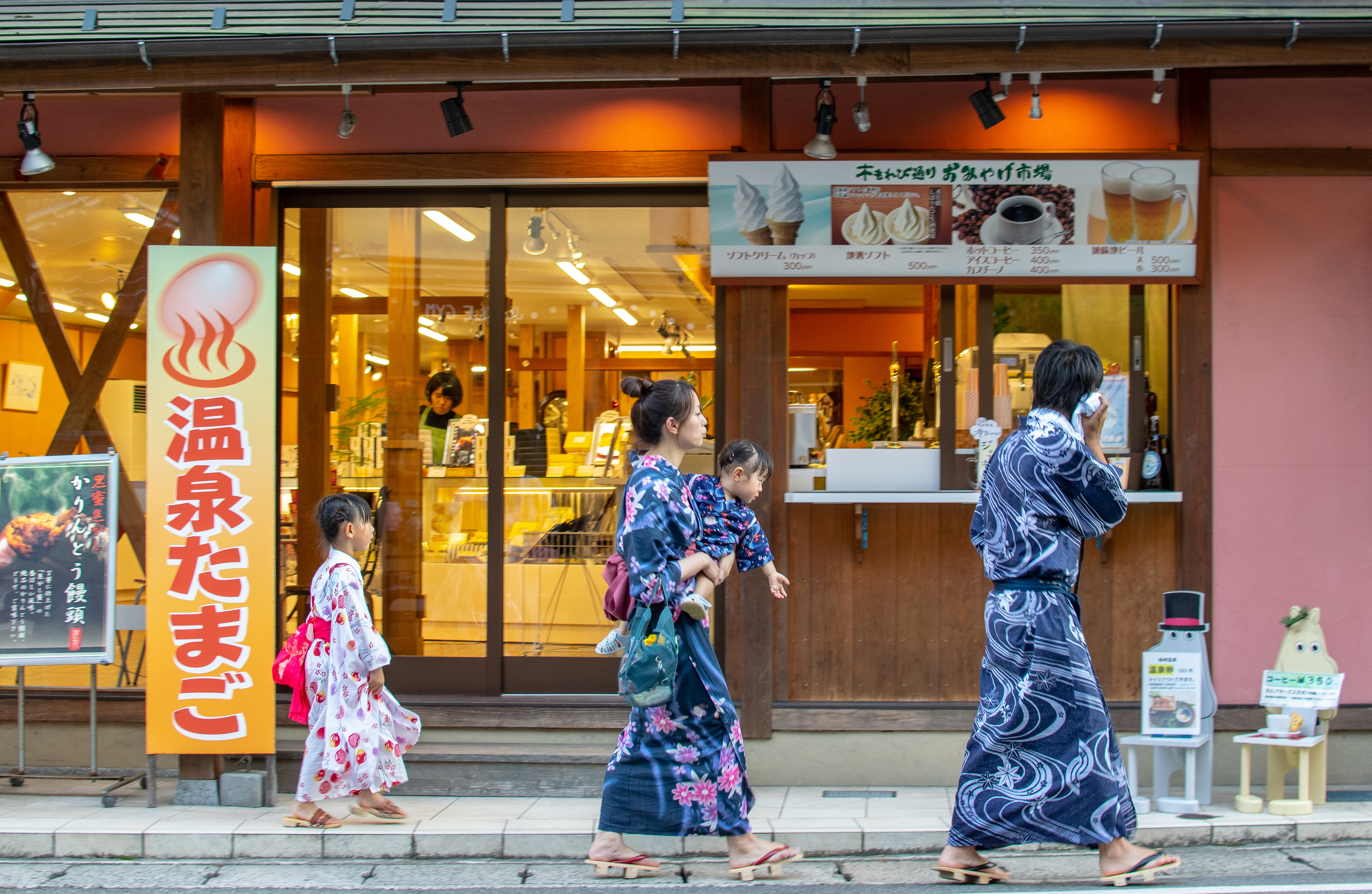
A family in yukata in an onsen town

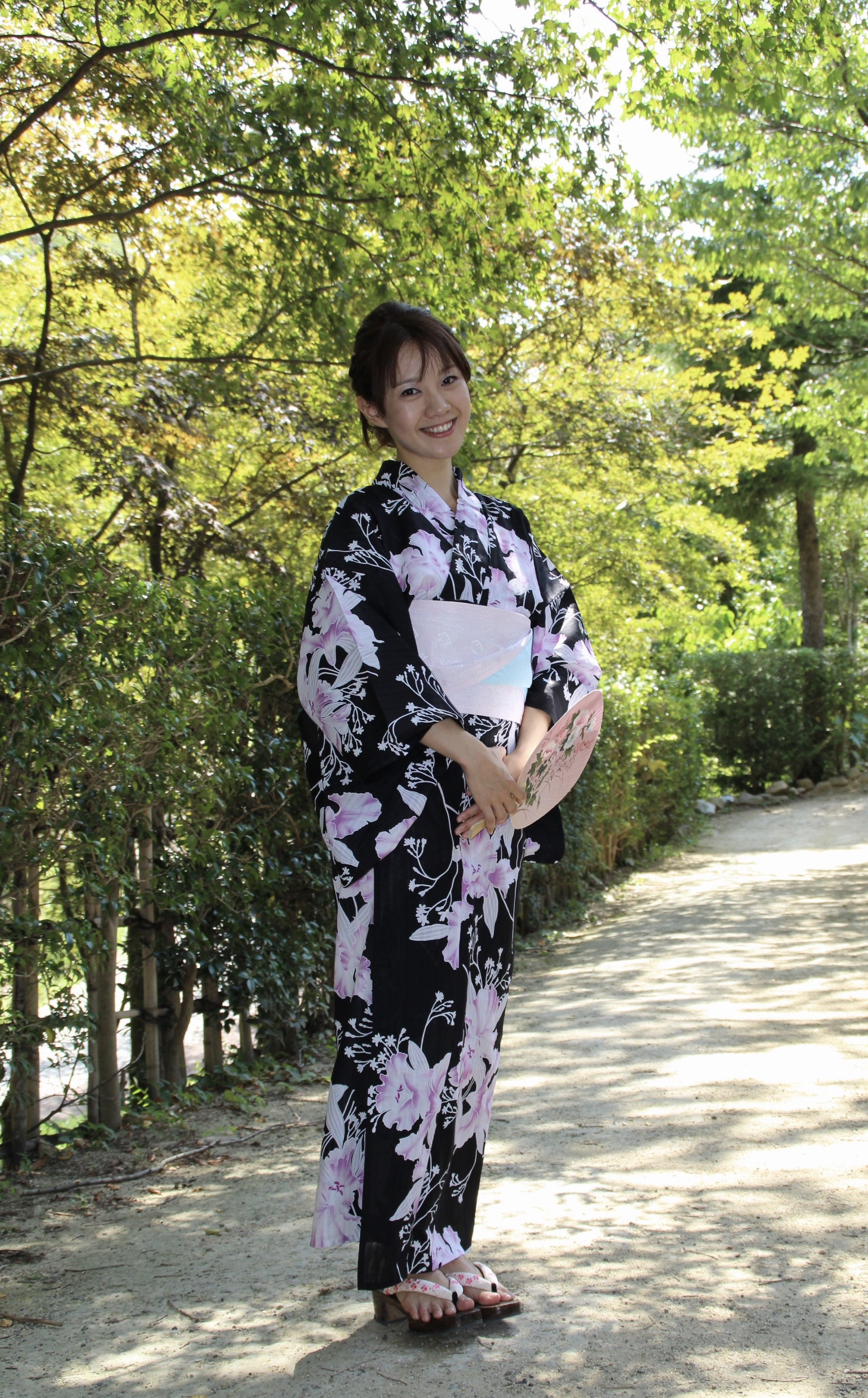
A Japanese woman wearing a yukata

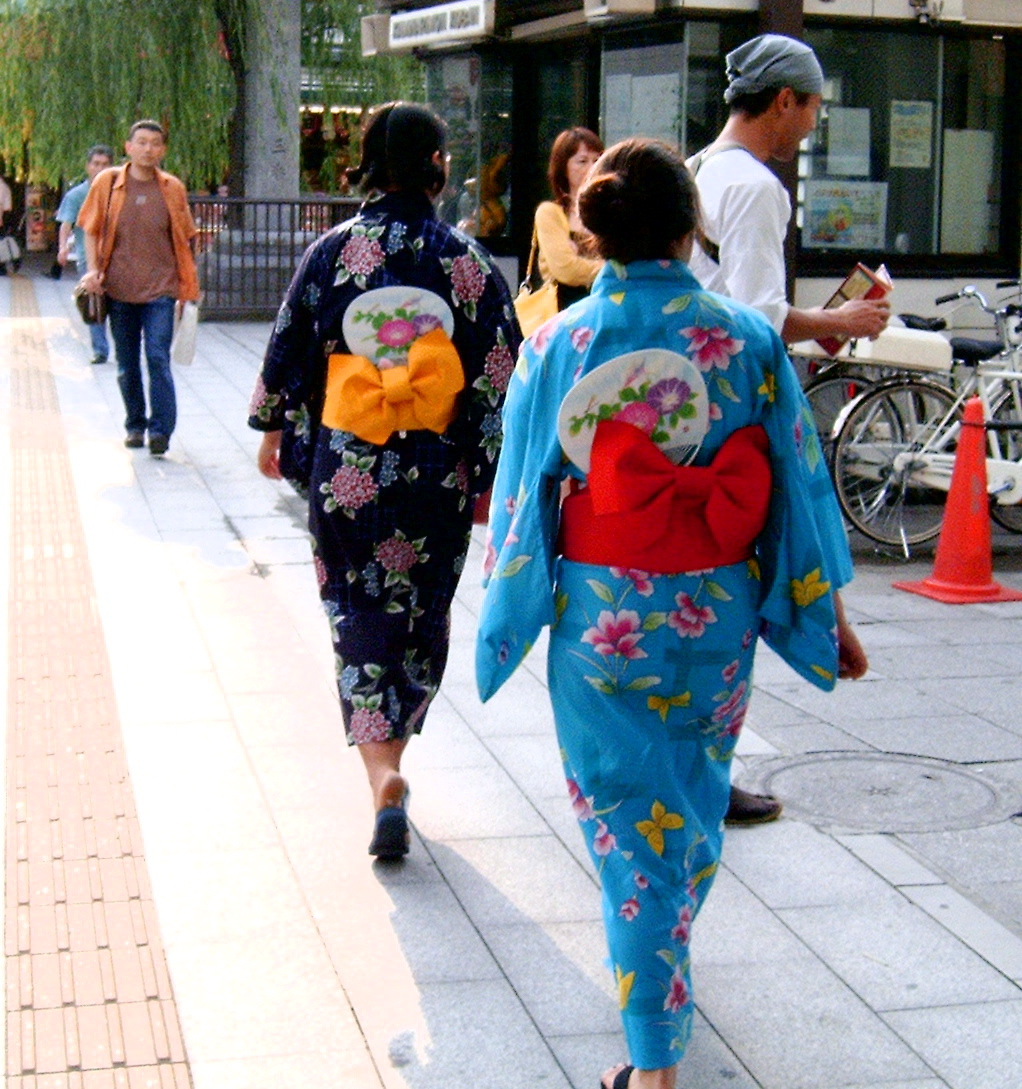
Women in yukata

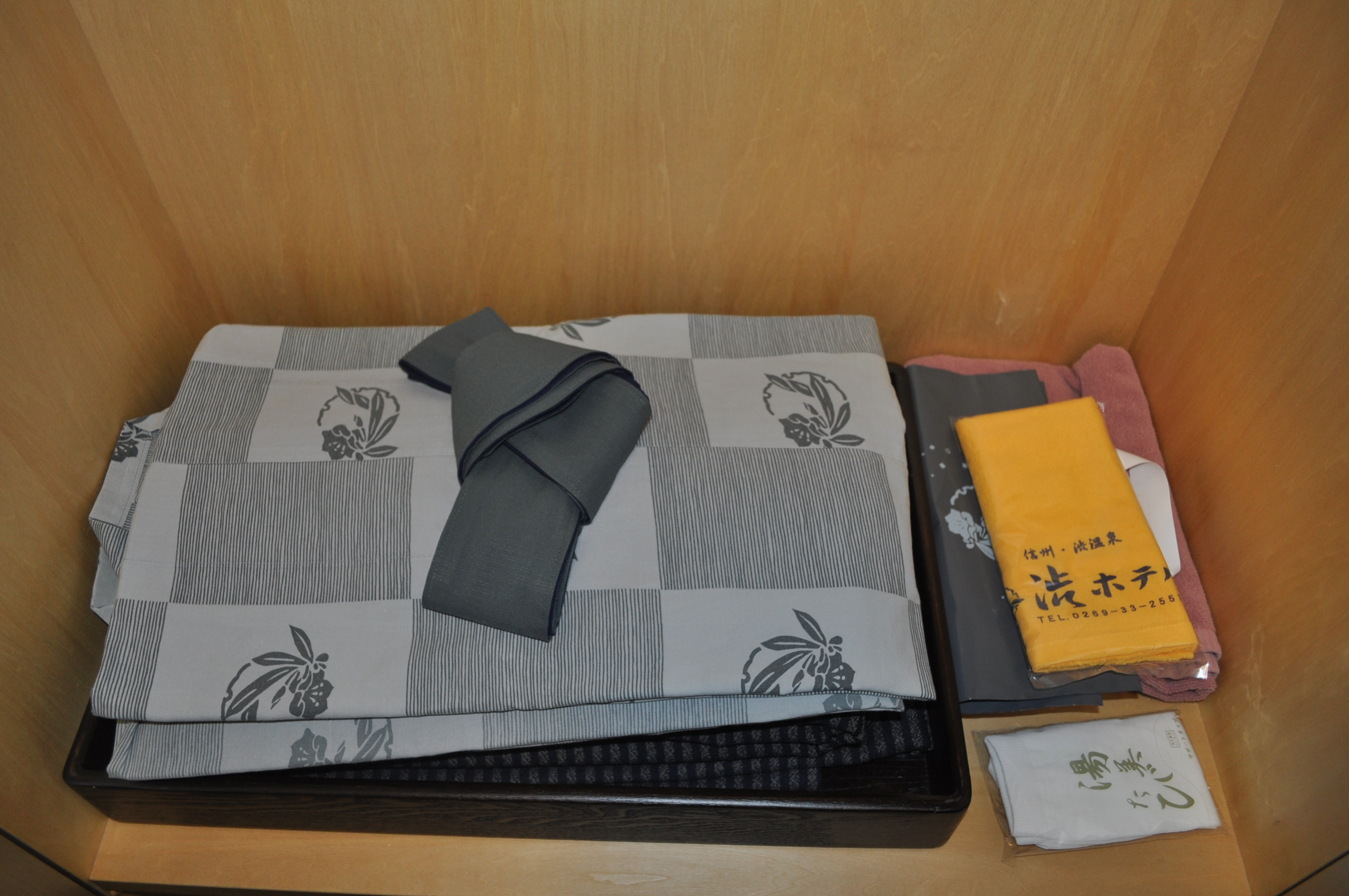
Folded yukata and obi at Shibu Hotel in Yamanouchi, Nagano

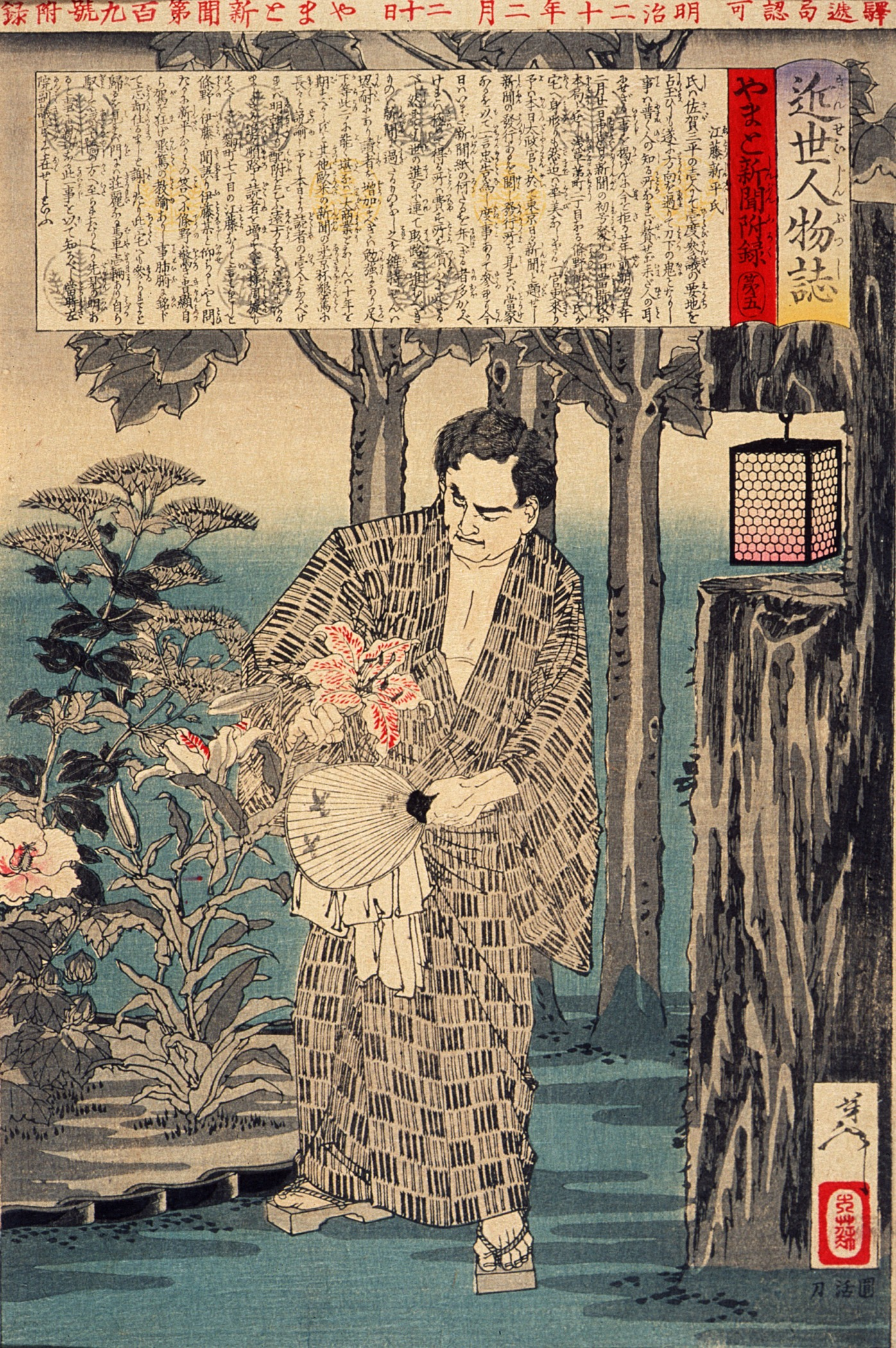
Endō Shimpei, 1887 woodblock print by Tsukioka Yoshitoshi

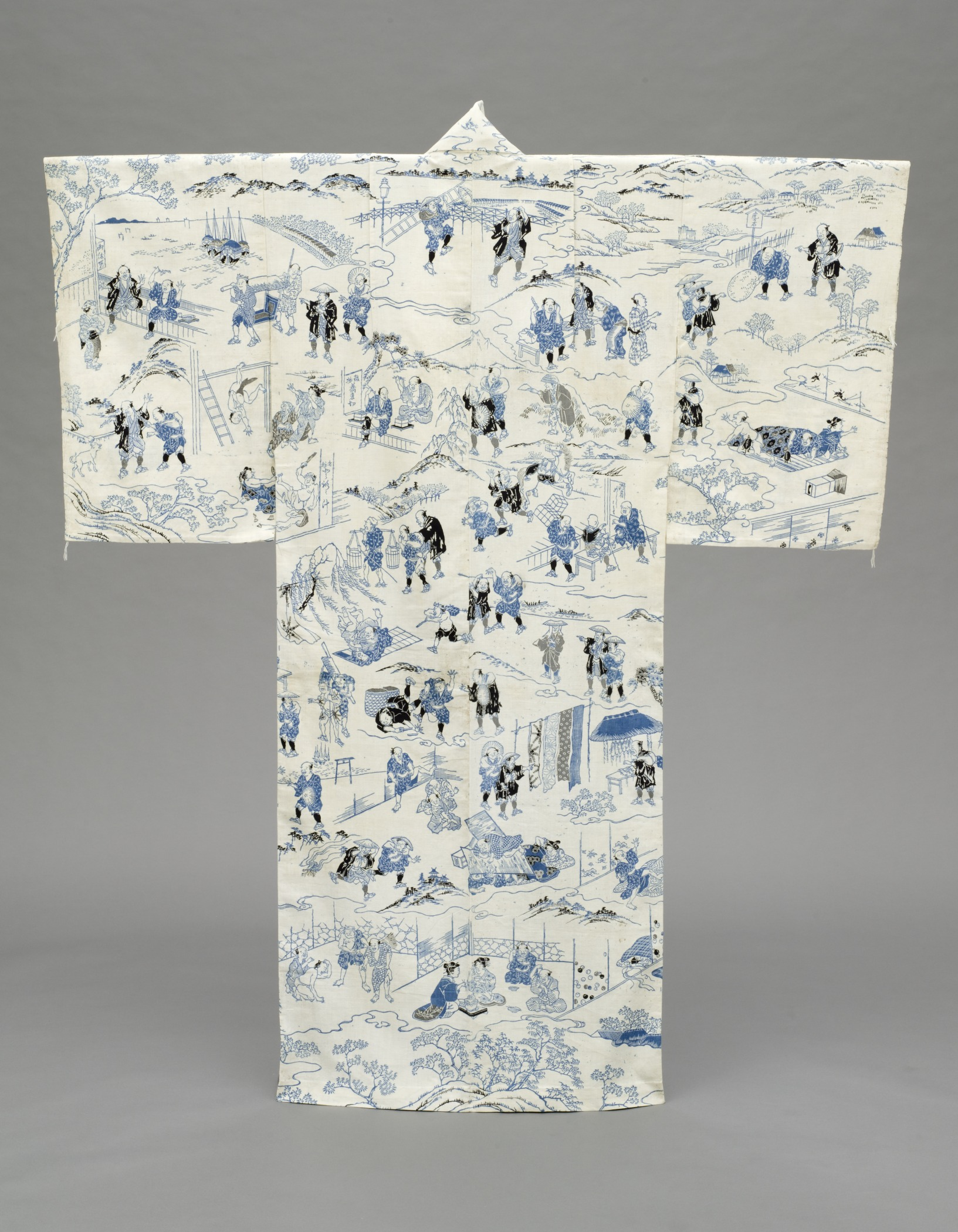
19th-century yukata at LACMA with illustrations from Hizakurige by Jippensha Ikku

Though historically, yukata were worn traditionally as a bathrobe all-year round, in the present day this is uncommonly seen, and is mainly confined to onsen resort towns such as Atami, Kinosaki and Kusatsu, where yukata are still worn as bathrobes, commonly supplied for guests to wear during their stay at a specific hotel or inn.

== See also ==
- Samue
- Jinbei
