= Jinbei =

Traditional Japanese clothing set, consisting of a top and trousers

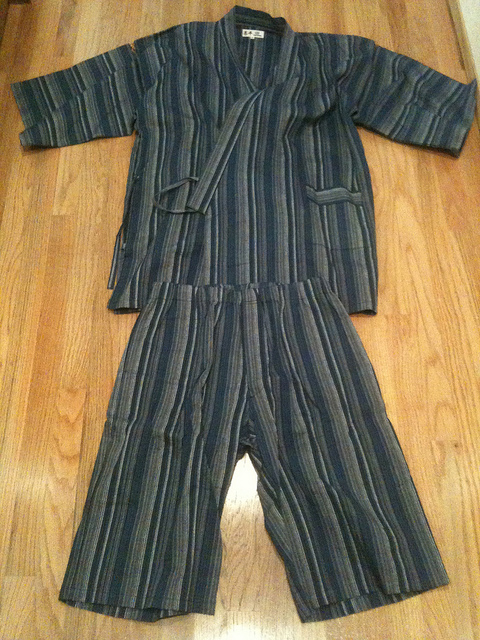
A full jinbei set

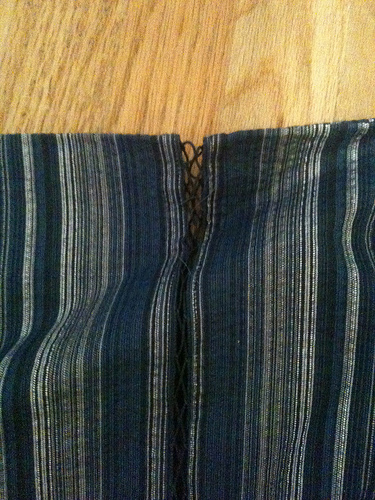
Jinbei are only loosely sewn together for ventilation

A jinbei (甚平) (alternately jinbē (甚兵衛) or hippari (ひっぱり)) is a traditional set of Japanese clothing worn by men, women and children during summer as loungewear. Consisting of a side-tying, tube-sleeved kimono-style top and a pair of trousers, jinbei were originally menswear only, although in recent years women's jinbei have become popular.

== Description ==
Jinbei typically come in a matching set of a top and trousers that are either short or long. Although the trousers resemble Western trousers, the top resembles a kimono, with a wrapped front and a long collar set on a diagonal angle. However, unlike kimono, jinbei typically do not have an overlapping front panel (known as the okumi), and feature two sets of ties – one inside and the other outside – to fasten the top shut. The top is roughly hip-length, and is wrapped left over right, with the internal ties fastened before the external ones.

Traditional jinbei are made from hemp or cotton, and are typically dyed a solid colour – such as indigo, blue or green – with either a muted or nonexistent pattern. Modern jinbei frequently feature prints ranging from simple textures to complicated and colourful floral patterns. Ladies' jinbei tend to be more brightly coloured, and often feature prints of popular culture characters and motifs.

Jinbei seams are very loosely sewn to allow for ventilation during hot weather and, from a distance, appear to form a short gap between different fabric pieces.

== Use ==
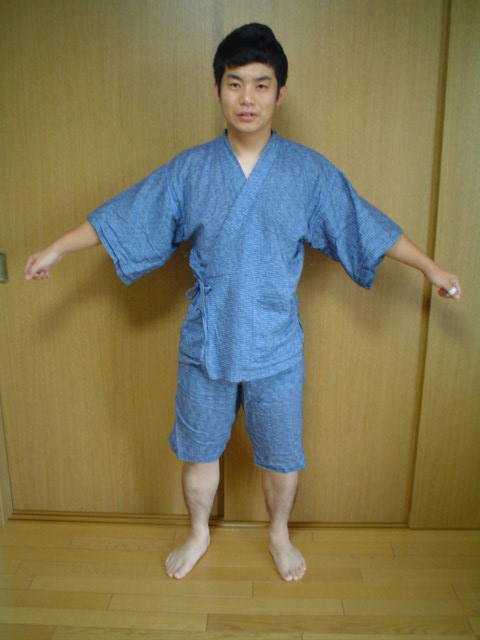
Man wearing Jinbei

Jinbei are usually worn as a form of nightwear or house clothes, and are considered very informal clothing. Normally, jinbei are typically only worn outside the house when travelling short distances, such as to go on a local errand, collecting the mail or while shopping. The formal use of jinbei, or wearing it outside the house for a long period, is frowned upon.

Jinbei can also be used as a substitute for yukata during the summer months, particularly at summer festivals.

The whale shark is also known as the jinbei-zame (ジンベイザメ（甚平鮫), "jinbei shark") or jinbē-zame (ジンベエザメ 《甚兵衛鮫》, "jinbee shark") in Japanese, due to its skin patterns resembling those seen on jinbei.

== See also ==
- Samue
- Yukata
