= Mount Okukane =

Mountain in Kurobe, Toyama, Japan

- 奥鐘山
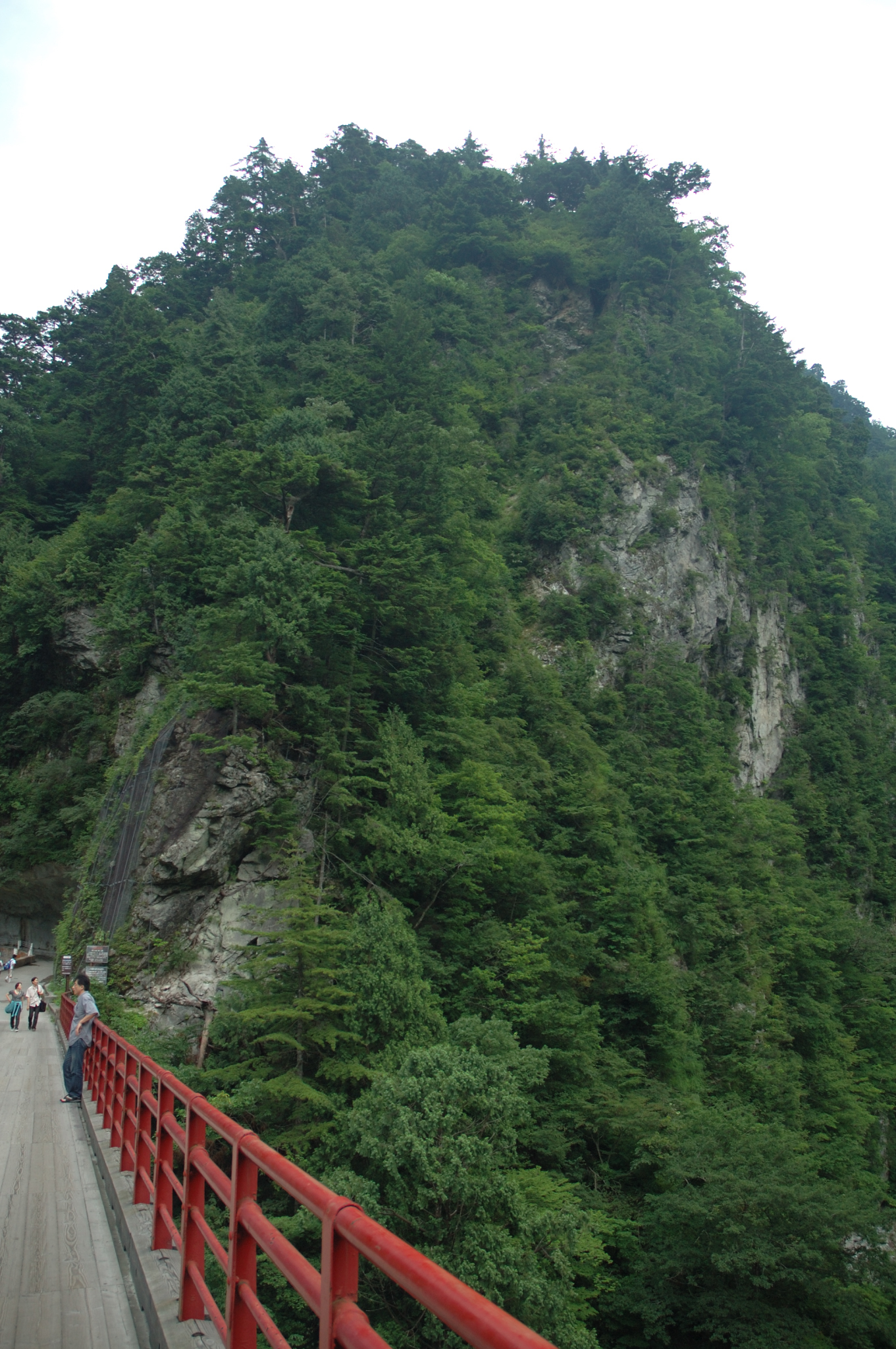
- Mount Okukane

Highest point
- Elevation: 1,543 m (5,062 ft)
- Coordinates: 36°41′17.81″N 137°40′24.59″E

Naming
- Language of name: Japanese
- Pronunciation: Japanese: [okɯ̥kane jama]

Geography
- Location within Japan
- Location: Tateyama and Kurobe, Toyama Prefecture, Japan

Climbing
- Easiest route: Hiking

Mount Okukane (奥鐘山, Okukane-yama) is a mountain located between the towns of Tateyama and Kurobe in Toyama Prefecture, Japan. The mountain has an elevation of 1,543 m (5,062 ft). Mount Okukane rises dramatically between the Kurobe Gorge and the Haba Valley to form, at 600 metres (2,000 ft), one of the foremost sheer rock faces in Japan. The mountain is primarily composed of granite and is part of the Hida Mountains, also known as the Northern Japan Alps. Mount Okukane, together with the Kurobe and Sarutobi gorges, were designated a Special Natural Monument and Special Place of Scenic Beauty in 1964.^{A}

== Etymology ==
The name of Mount Okukane in the Japanese language is formed from two kanji: 奥, meaning "behind" or "rear" and 鐘, meaning "bell" or "chime". The name of the mountain is an abbreviation for 奥鐘釣 (Okukanetsuri), a reference to Mount Okukane being the farthest to the rear of the many mountains called Kanetsuri. The mountain appears in maps beginning in the Edo period (1603 – 1868), the earliest being in 1648.

== Recreation ==
The sheer face of Mount Okukane has become a popular destination for rock climbers. The mountain and the surrounding Kurobe Gorge are known for their fall colors, which have a long season from the middle of October to the middle of November. The 34 metres (112 ft) Okukane Bridge, a bright red pedestrian bridge which spans high over the Kurobe River, connects Keyakidaira Station to numerous hiking trails and two ryokan inns with onsen (hot springs).

== Transportation ==
Mount Okukane is accessible from the Kurobe Gorge Railway. The railway was originally built for the construction of the Kurobe Dam, but is now used for tourism in the Kurobe Gorge area. The railway begins at Unazuki Station, a ten-minute walk from the Main Line Unazukionsen Station. The Okukane Bridge is directly adjacent to Keyakidaira Station, the terminus of the railroad.

== Footnote ==
A.In Japanese: 黒部峡谷附猿飛並びに奥鐘山 (Kurobe Kyōkoku tsuketari Sarutobi narabi-ni Okukane-yama).
