= Toro (archaeological site) =

Archaeological site in Japan

Toro Iseki
- 登呂遺跡 (Japanese)
- Toro Archaeological Site; Toro Ruins
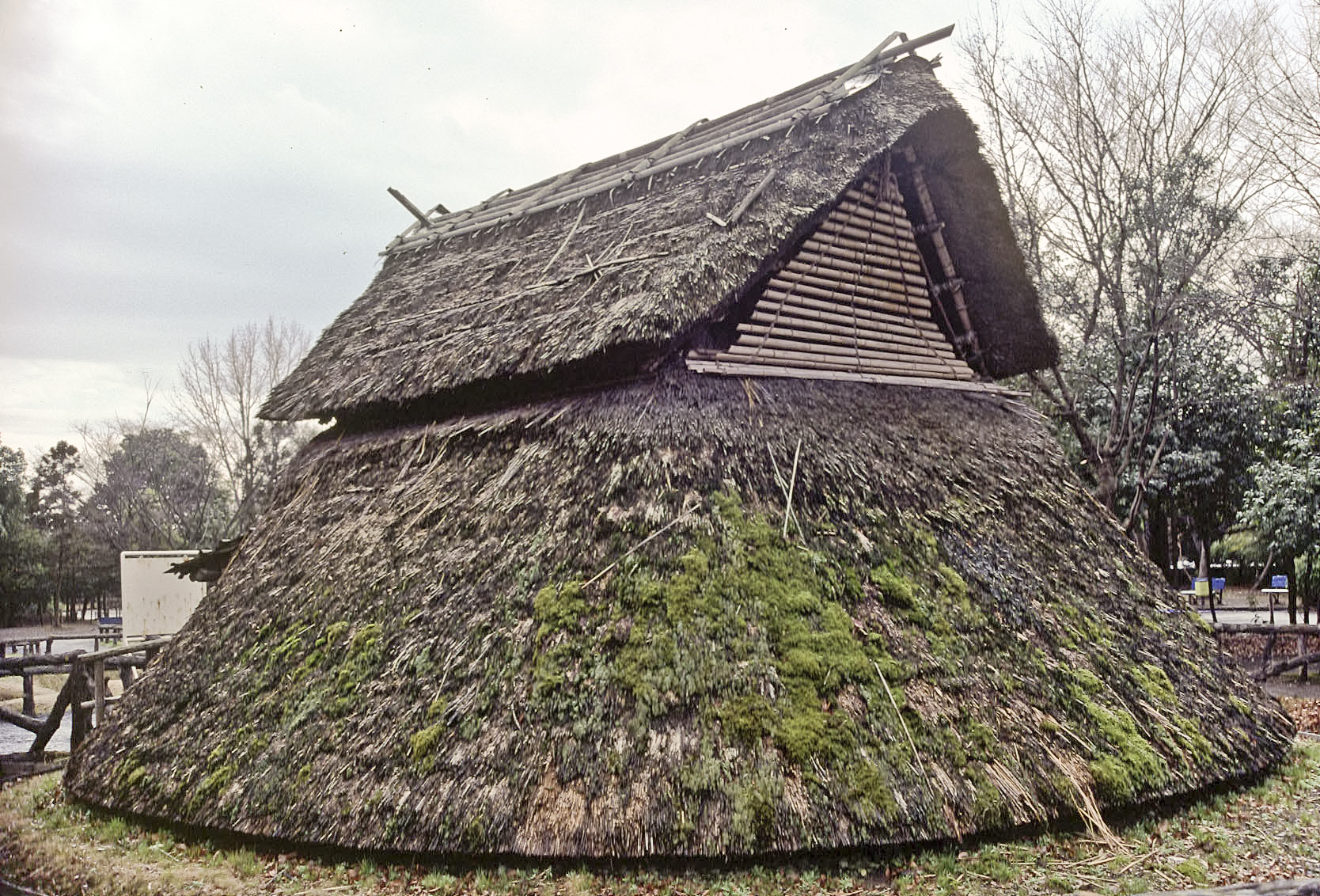
- Toro pit-dwelling reconstruction

- Toro ruins Toro (archaeological site) (Japan)
- 34°57′22″N 138°24′29″E
- Type: settlement
- Periods: Yayoi period
- Region: JP

History
- Built: 1st century CE

Site notes
- Area: 330,000 square metres (3,600,000 sq ft)
- Owner: Public
- Public access: Yes
- Website: www.shizuoka-toromuseum.jp

Toro (登呂 遺跡, Toro iseki) is an archaeological site in Suruga Ward in Shizuoka City, 130 kilometres (81 mi) southwest of Tokyo, Japan. The site contains the ruins of a settlement which dates to the 1st century CE, in the late Yayoi period. Discovered in 1943, it was excavated from 1947 to 1948 and designated a Special Historic Site of Japan in 1952. Toro is also the name of the area surrounding it in the Japanese addressing system.

== Background ==
Toro is notable as the first archaeological site excavated in Japan in which remains of 1st-century CE Yayoi-era wet-rice paddy fields were found. The site was discovered in 1943 during construction work on a military munitions plant in World War II, and was excavated in 1947 and 1948. In 1965 an excavation survey was conducted before the construction of Tōmei Expressway within the planned route.

As well as the agricultural remains, archaeological findings included Pit-house dwellings, refuse pits, and raised-floor buildings. Many artifacts were also unearthed. The preservation at the Toro site was so complete that a large number of 2000-year-old wooden farming tools were excavated. The site was re-excavated from 1999 to 2003, during which time additional artifacts were uncovered.

The archaeological remains from Toro elicited such an intense interest from Japanese archaeologists that the Japanese Archaeological Association was formed to study it. Toro has been used as a type site for Yayoi culture despite the fact that the location of the settlement in the Tōkai region was peripheral to what has traditionally been considered the Yayoi formation area in northern Kyūshū.

== Site ==
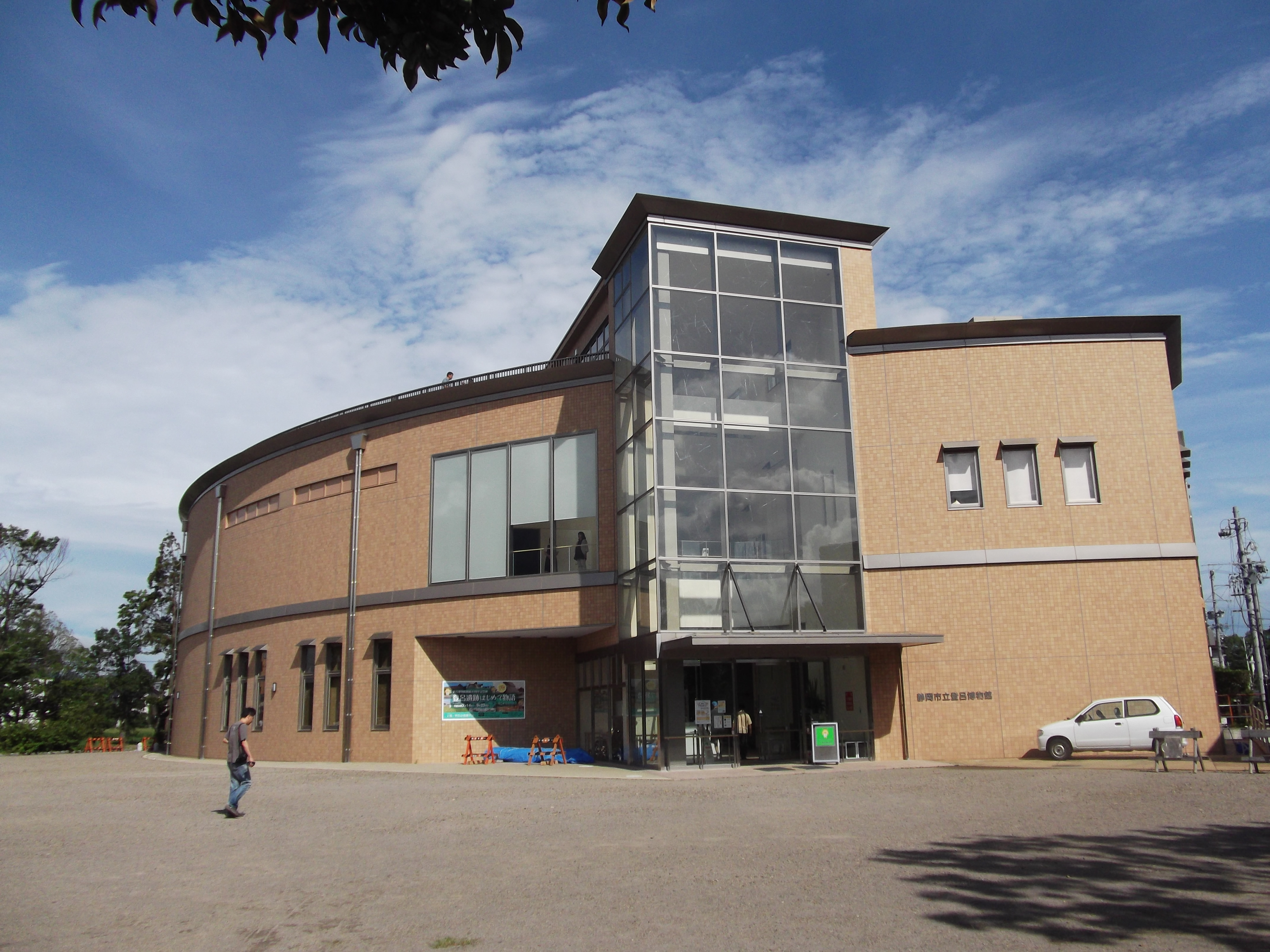
Shizuoka City Toro Museum

The total area of the Toro site is 330,000 m^{2} (3,600,000 sq ft). Twelve pit-houses were excavated but as the archaeologists were not able to establish the boundaries of the original Yayoi settlement, the true size of the village is unknown and may have been much larger. In addition to the houses, two raised-floor buildings were found. Archaeologists interpret these as storehouses.

The Toro pit-dwellings had a roughly 6-by-8-metre (20 ft × 26 ft) living area, with a double skirting wall approximately 30 cm (12 in) high around the circumference. Four wooden posts were sunk into the ground, with beams connecting at the top, and rafters radiating down to the ground level. The whole was covered in thatch. Within, the floor level was even with the outside ground, and a hearth was sunk into the floor in the center. The elevated buildings had an entrance ladder carved from a single log of wood. These buildings were apparently built of planks, using a mortise and tenon joinery method, which indicates that the builders had use of iron tools.

Over fifty rice paddies were uncovered, comprising seventy thousand square metres with refined irrigation practices.

The Toro community was wiped out by a catastrophic flood of the Abe River.

The site is now preserved as a public archaeological park with reconstructed buildings and rice fields, and is protected by the Japanese government as a National Historic Monument. A museum at the site preserves and displays many of the artifacts discovered. 775 artifacts excavated from Toro site are designated as Important Cultural Property of Japan in 2016.

== Gallery ==
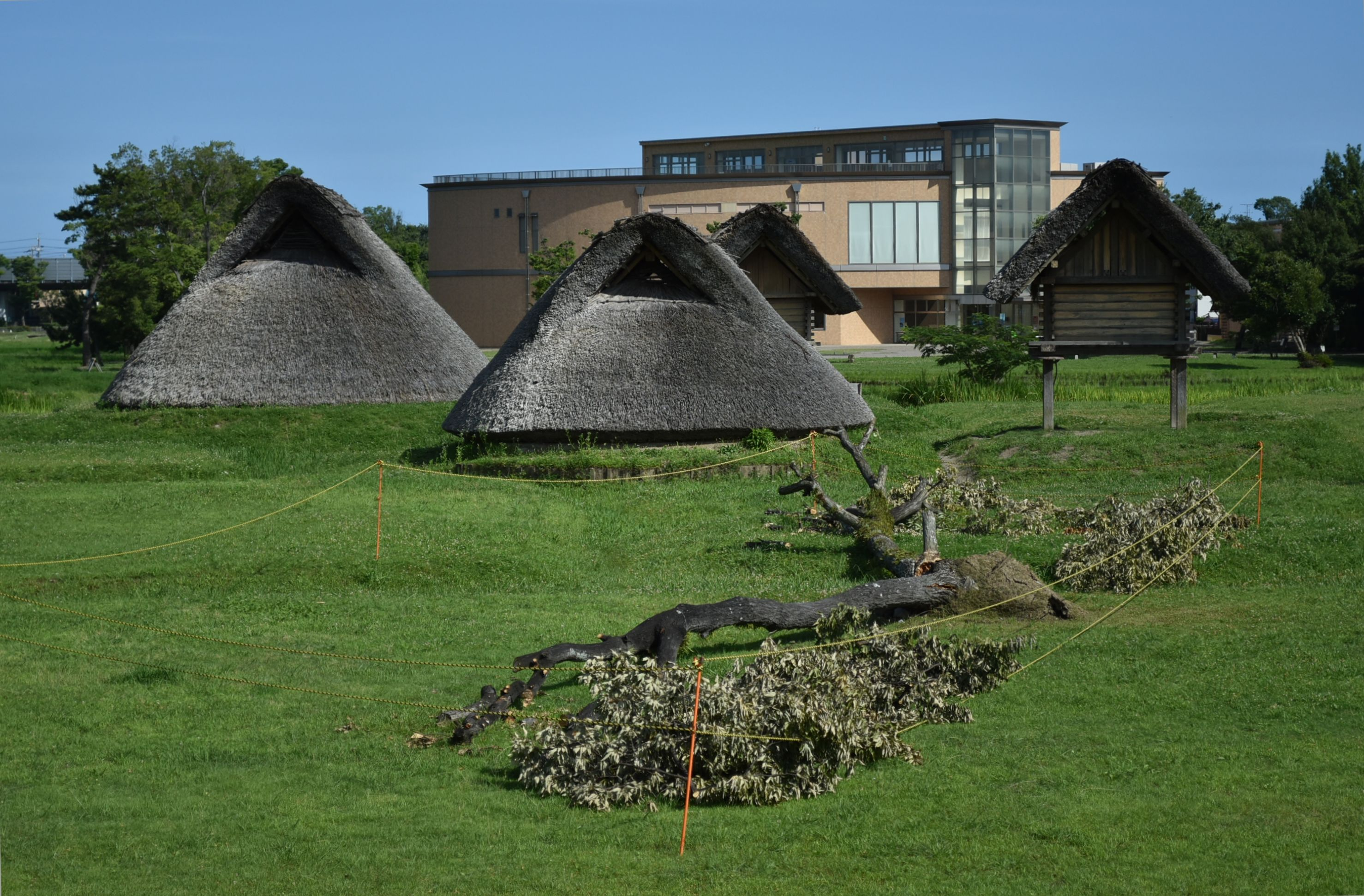
View from the entry to the site

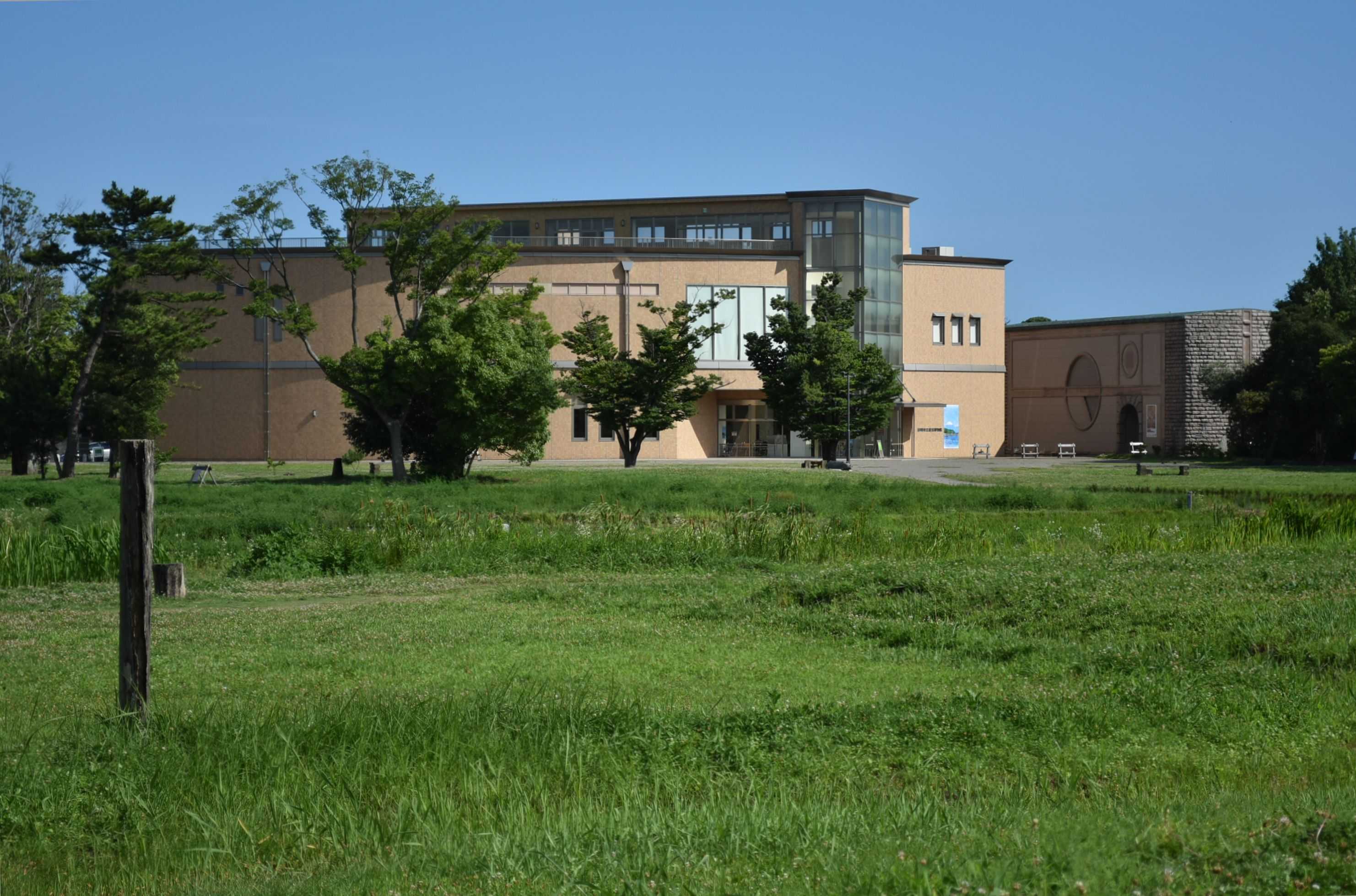
Museum

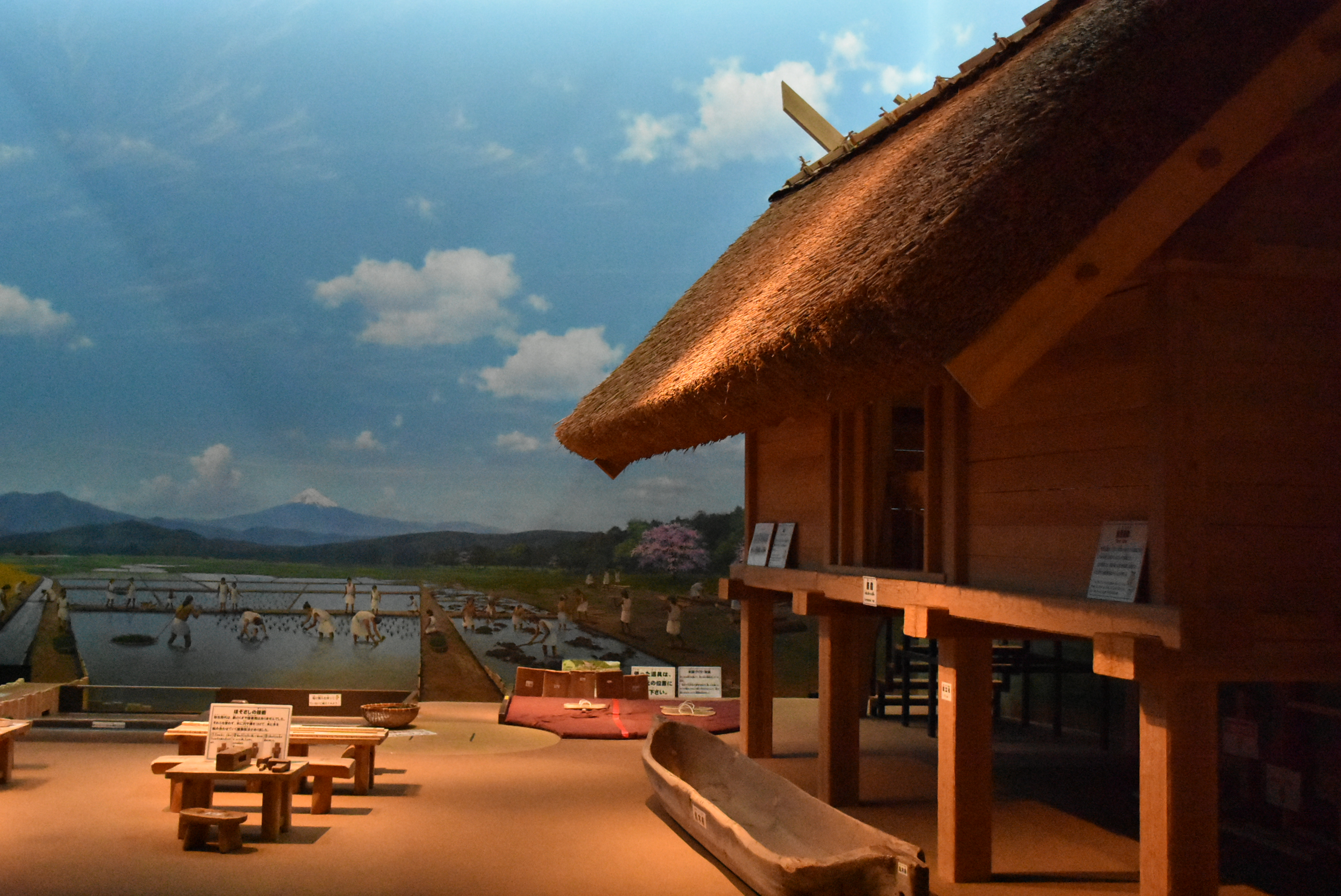
Diorama in the museum

restored pit dwelling

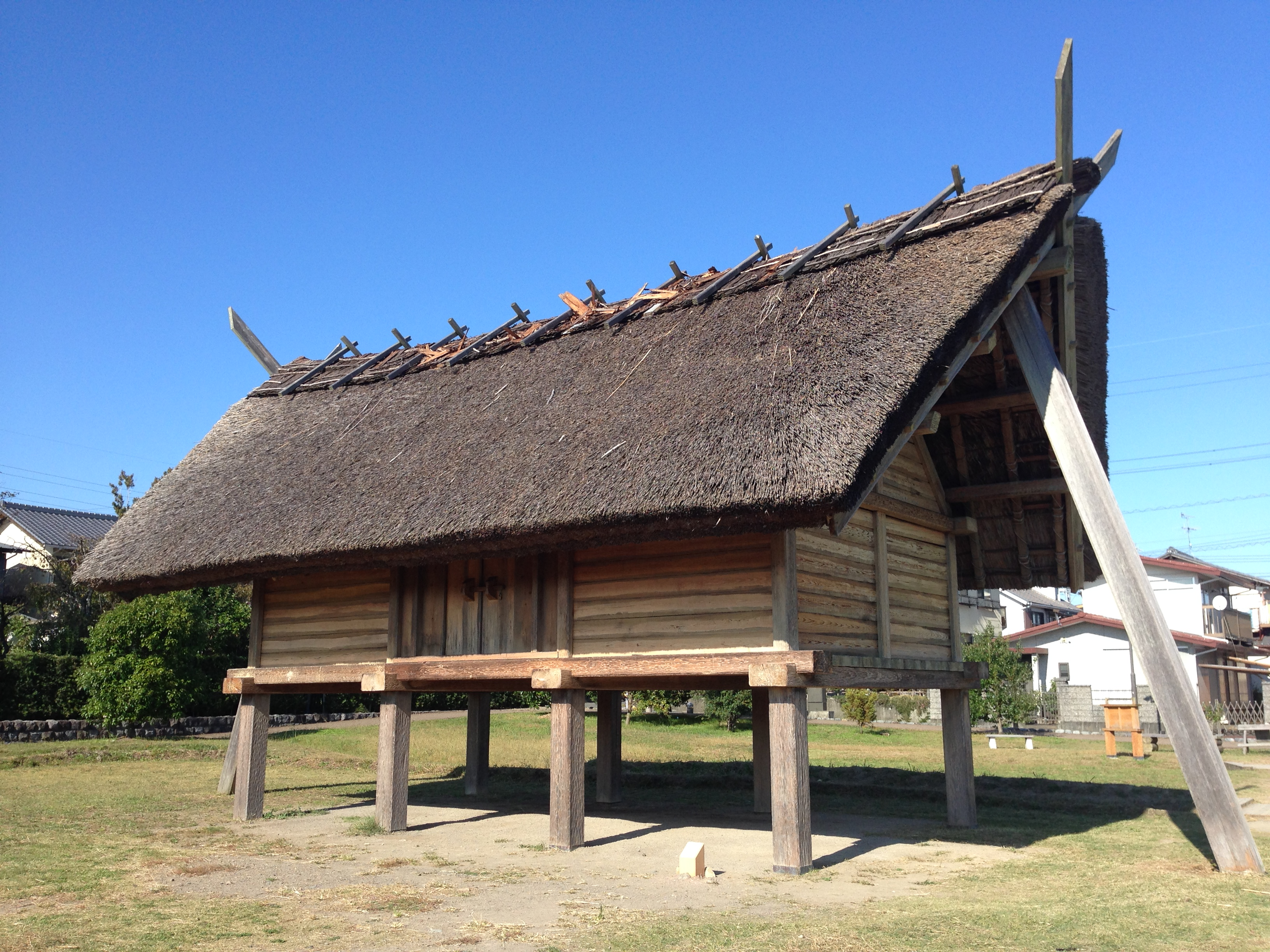
restored ceremonial building

== See also ==
- List of Special Places of Scenic Beauty, Special Historic Sites and Special Natural Monuments
- List of Historic Sites of Japan (Shizuoka)
- Yoshinogari site
