= Samu (Zen) =

Physical work done with mindfulness

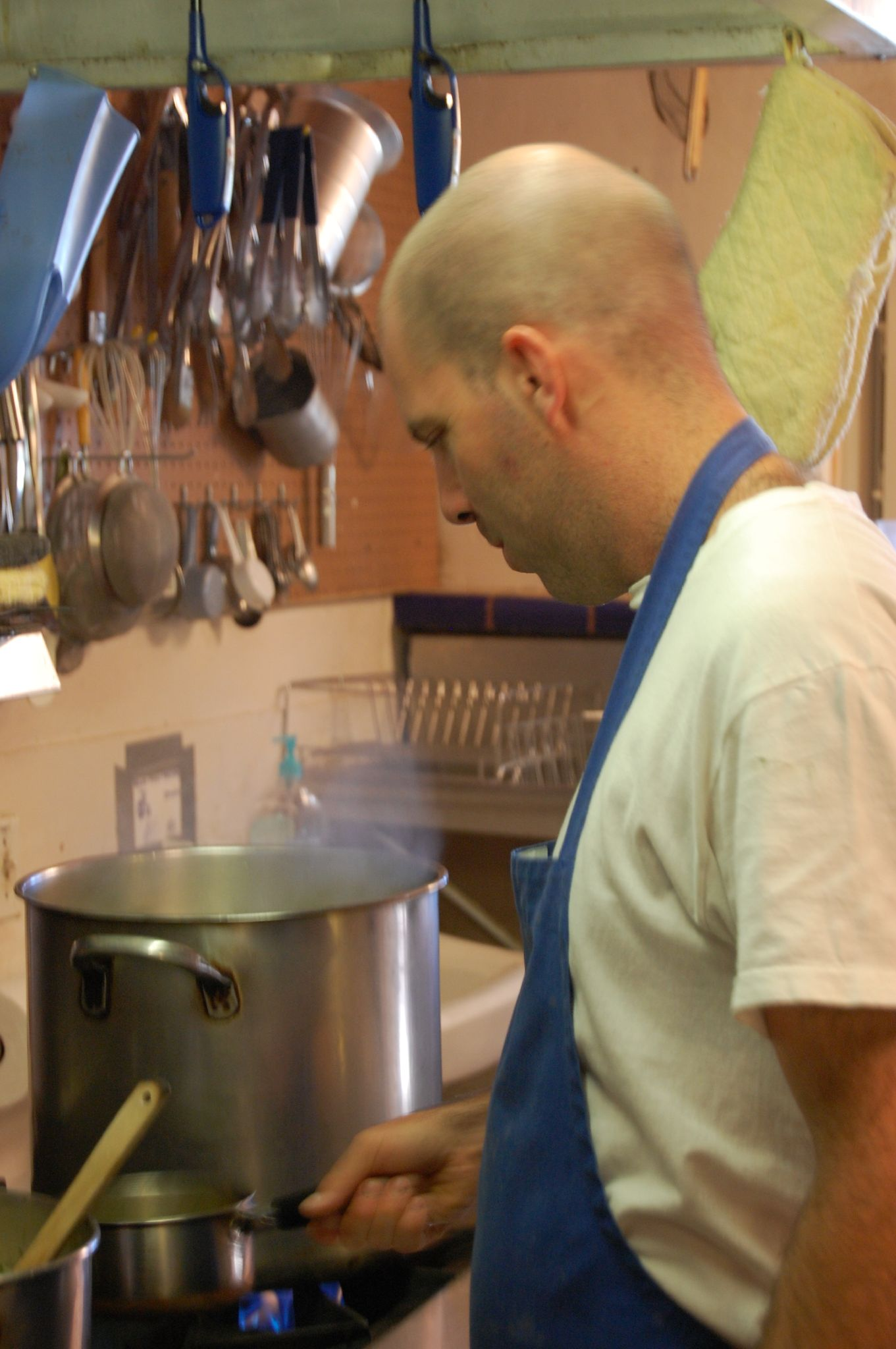
Samu in the kitchen

Samu (作務) is participation in the physical work needed to maintain the Zen monastery. According to tradition, it was emphasized by Baizhang Huaihai, who is credited with establishing an early set of rules for Chan (Chinese Zen) monastic discipline, the Pure Rules of Baizhang. As the Zen monks farmed, it helped them to survive the Great Anti-Buddhist Persecution more than other sects which relied more on donations. These rules are still used today in many Zen monasteries. From this text comes the well-known saying "A day without work is a day without food" (一日不做 一日不食 "One day not work, one day not eat").

== See also ==
- Samue – work clothes when engaged in samu

== Sources ==
- Bresnan, Patrick S. (2017), Awakening: An Introduction to the History of Eastern Thought, Routledge
- Dumoulin, Heinrich (2005), Zen Buddhism: India and China, World Wisdom, Inc, ISBN 978-0-941532-89-1
- Heine, Steven; Wright, Dale (2010), Zen Masters, New York: Oxford University Press, ISBN 978-0-19-979885-8
- Seager, Richard Hughes (2012), Buddhism in America, Columbia University Press
