= Samue =

Work clothing of Japanese Buddhist monks and nuns

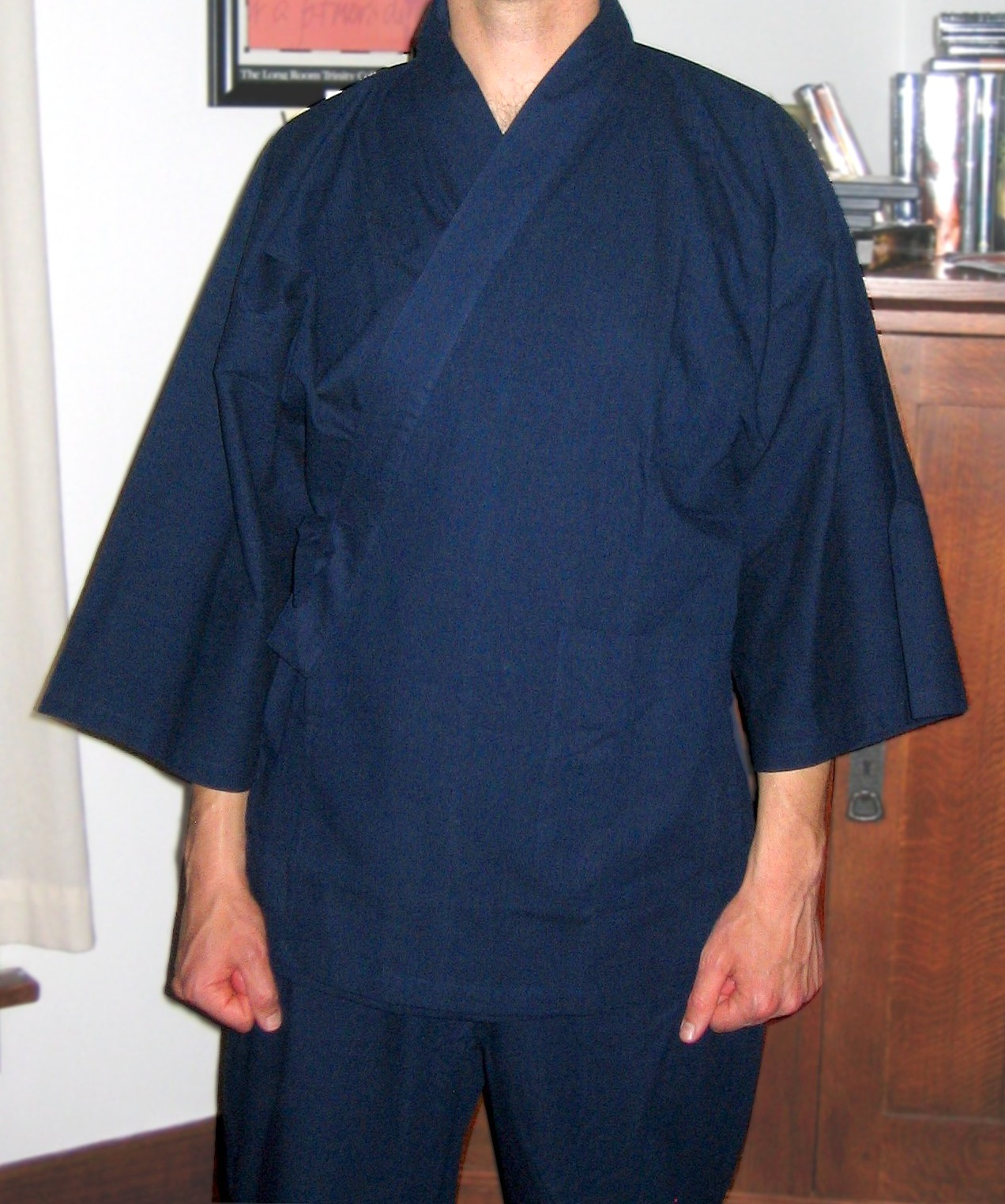
A samue being worn

The samue (作務衣) is the work clothing of Japanese Buddhist monks and nuns, worn when engaged in samu.

== Features ==
Made from cotton or linen and traditionally dyed brown or indigo to distinguish them from formal vestments, samue are worn by monks of most Japanese Buddhist traditions performing labour duty such as temple maintenance and field work.

== Usage ==
In modern times, they have become popular as general casual or work wear. Modern-day Shakuhachi players, because of the instrument's historical association with Zen Buddhism, sometimes wear samue.

Samue are often worn by many farmers, and home owners when performing general landscaping and gardening tasks as well.

== See also ==
- Jinbei
- Yukata
