= Muryōkōin =

Coordinates: 34°12′54″N 135°35′12″E

Muryōkōin 無量光院
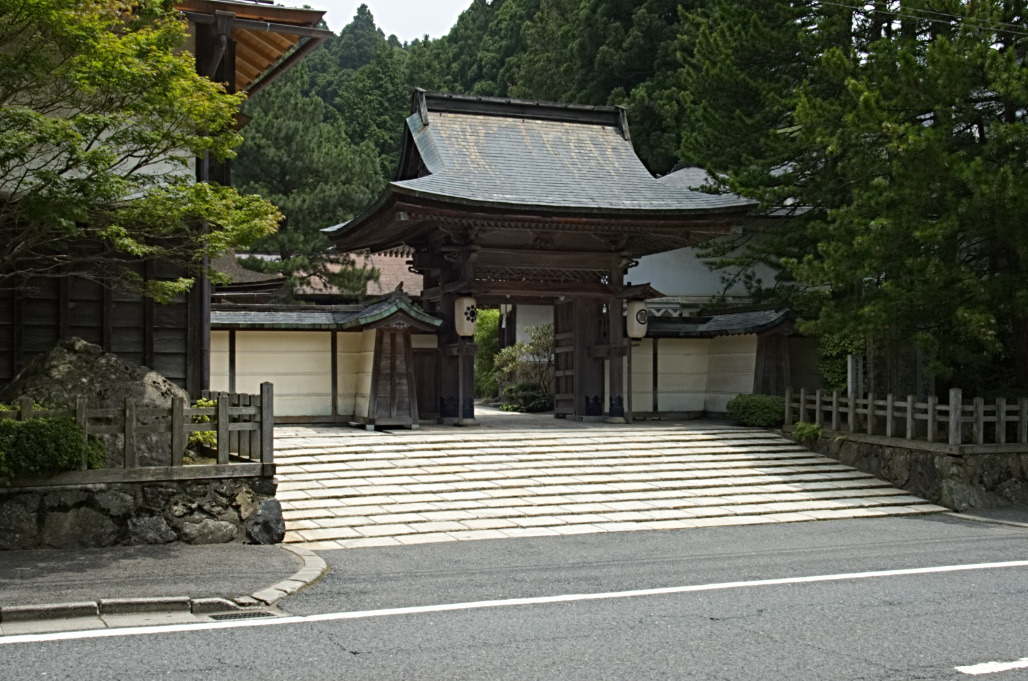
- Gate of Muryokoin, Koyasan

Religion
- Affiliation: Kōyasan School of Shingon Buddhism
- Deity: Amida Nyorai (Amitābha)

Location
- Location: 611 Kōyasan, Kōya-chō, Ito-gun, Wakayama Prefecture
- Country: Japan
- Interactive map of Muryōkōin 無量光院

Architecture
- Founder: Kakuhō Shinō

Website
- https://www.muryokoin.org/ (English)

Muryōkōin (無量光院) is a temple of Koyasan Shingon Buddhism, located on Mount Kōya (高野山, Kōya-san), Wakayama prefecture, Japan. Its name means "Temple of limitless light" and is the Japanese transliteration of Amitābha.

The temple was first constructed during the Heian period by Prince Kakuhō Shinō (覚法法親王; 1092-1153), a son of Emperor Shirakawa (白河天皇; 1053-1129; r. 1073-1087). The exact year is unknown. After the devastating fire in 1888 on Mount Kōya (高野山, Kōya-san), the temple was united with Shicchin (悉地院) and relocated to its current location.
