= Hokutolite =

Mineral

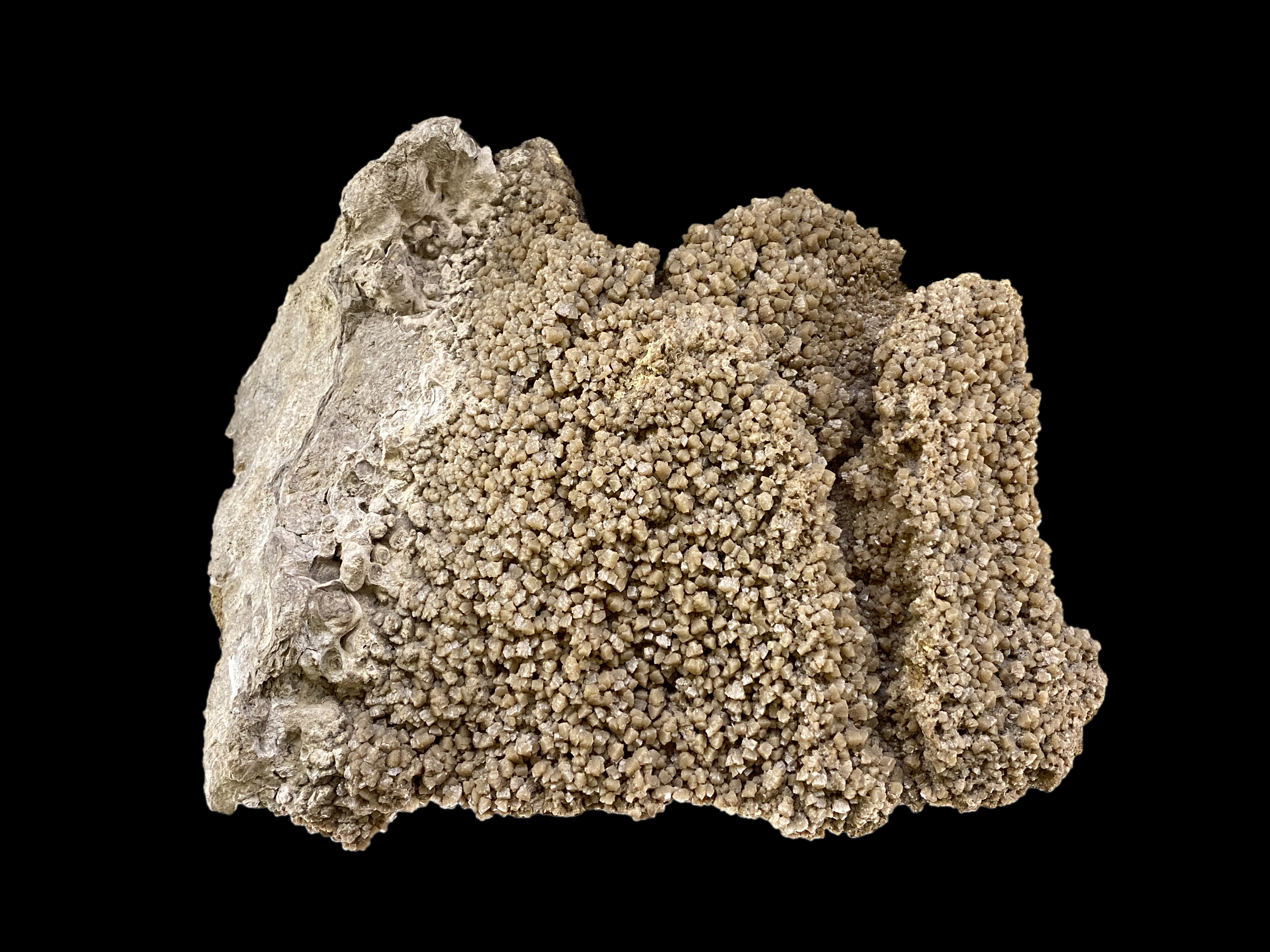

General
- Category: Sulfate mineral
- Formula: (Ba,Pb)SO_{4}
- Crystal system: Orthorhombic

Identification
- Color: White, yellowish-brown
- Mohs scale hardness: 3 - 3.5
- Luster: Greasy, vitreous
- Streak: White
- Diaphaneity: Opaque
- Specific gravity: 4.69 - 4.83

Hokutolite is the only mineral variety named after a Taiwanese place (Hokuto is the Japanese name for Beitou). Hokutolite is a rare mineral containing radioactive radium elements generated by the hot spring environment, and is currently found only in Beitou Hot Spring in Taipei City, and Tamagawa Hot Spring in Akita Prefecture, Japan. In Japan, the Ministry of Education, Culture, Sports, Science, and Technology has designated it as a "Special Natural Monument". In Taiwan, it is designated as a Natural Cultural Landscape, and the Taipei City Government has designated a natural reserve in the Beitou River upstream of the Beitou Hot Spring Museum.

== Characteristics ==
Hokutolite is a variety of baryte, a sulfate mineral of the orthorhombic system. The chemical composition of Hokutolite varies greatly, especially when it has a structure of light and dark interphase rings, and the molecular formula of the chemical composition calculated for different rings is between (Pb_{0.35}-Ba_{0.65})SO_{4} and (Pb_{0.20}-Ba_{0.80})SO_{4}. The highest BaO content of Hokutolite is about 42% and the lowest is 32%. The BaO content of pure baryte (BaSO_{4}) should be 65.7%. The molecule ratio of PbSO_{4} to BaSO_{4} can range from 21:79 to 32:68 (its average value is close to 27:73). Therefore, the content of lead and barium is not fixed, but changes in the range of 1:4 to 1:2 (lead:barium), with the content of barium greater than lead. Hokutolite is also radioactive because it contains radium.

== History ==
In 1905 (Meiji 38), Okamoto Yohachiro, who was a technician in the Mining Division of the Bureau of Productive Industries of the Government-General of Taiwan and a displayer at the Museum attached to the Department of Mines and Industry of the Government-General of Taiwan (now the National Taiwan Museum), first discovered sediment in the Beitou River near Beitou's Long Nice Hot Spring, but did not study it in depth at that time.

In 1907 (Meiji 40), Okamoto found mineral crystals of Hokutolite, and after preliminary tests, it was found to have a high density and to contain lead (Pb), which was produced in an acidic hot spring environment, so it was temporarily called anglesite (PbSO_{4}), a commonly known mineral. Later, Okamoto placed the mineral crystals on an unexposed glass negative in a laboratory darkroom, and after 10 days of development, the negative was found to be completely light-sensitive, confirming the presence of radioactive elements in the mineral crystals. In the same year, Professor Kotora Jimbo of Tokyo Imperial University discovered this mineral specimen, which is the same as the specimen collected by Hirosaburo Sakurai at Tamagawa Hot Spring in 1898 in the Mineral Specimen Room of Tokyo Imperial University.

In 1912 (Taisho 1), Professor Kotora Jimbo brought the specimens of minerals collected by Okamoto in Beitou to the International Mineral Conference in St. Petersburg, the capital of Russia, and submitted an application for the examination of new mineral species discovery. Together with Professor Vernardsky, the Chairperson of the Russian Committee for Radium Mining Investigation, Professor Kotora Jimbo jointly named the newly discovered mineral Hokutolite (Hokuto is the Japanese name for Beitou, and -lite is a suffix given to rocks and minerals in English). The government also immediately enacted a mining ban along Beitou River.

On April 25, 1923 (Taisho 12), the Crown Prince Hirohito visited Beitou and surveyed the Beitou River, and later set up a memorial monument (currently located in the vicinity of the Long Nice Hot Spring) to commemorate this event.

== Related research ==
In 1915, the Bureau of Productive Industries of the Government-General of Taiwan published the Hokutolite Survey Report, which introduced the distribution area of Hokutolite, mineralogical research data, and its radiological phenomena.

In 1928, the eleventh list of new mineral names was published (Spexcer, L. J. et al., Eleventh list of new mineral names), stating that one of the minerals in the British Museum was named lead barite, a variant of anglesite with a chemical composition of 5PbSO_{4}．BaSO_{4}, discovered by mineralogist Kolbeck in 1907, is of Chilean origin, named after Professor Julius Albin Weisbach of Germany, and is the same mineral as Hokutolite.

Due to the lack of radiation sources, a component of Hokutolite, polonium (Po), was often used as a reference material for atomic nucleus experiments during the Japanese colonial rule, making Hokutolite of great significance in the history of physics in Taiwan. On the evening of July 25, 1934 (Showa 9), the team of Bunsaku Arakatsu of the Physics Chair of the Taipei Imperial University successfully completed an artificial impact experiment on atomic nuclei. This was the first successful experiment in Asia and the second in the world. One of the key factors in the success of the lead was the use of the polonium from Hokutolite as a comparative value.

In 1961, the former director of the Academia Sinica of the Republic of China, Yuan-Tseh Lee, wrote his master's thesis on "A Study of the Radioactivity of Beitou Stone" when he was a student at National Tsing Hua University, also with Hokutolite as a research topic.

In 1995, Lian-Sheng Tzeng found that the natural radioactive nuclei of Hokutolite contained 2.256×10^{−9} grams of radium-226 and 4.87×10^{−13} grams of radium-228.

== Protection and rehabilitation ==
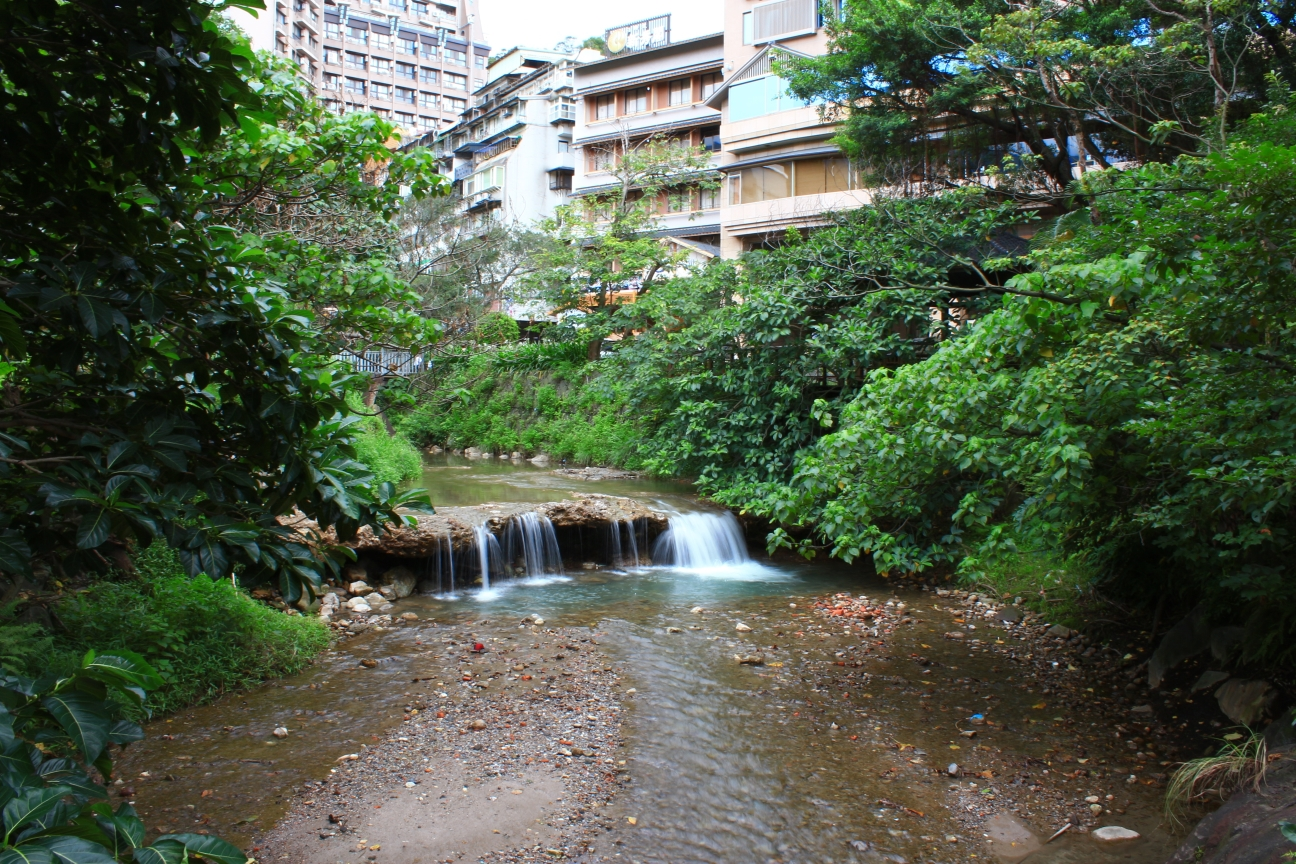
Hokutolite Natural Reserve

On November 26, 1933 (Showa 8), the Government-General Taiwan designated Hokutolite as a Natural Monument in accordance with the Law for the Preservation of Historic and Natural Monuments.

In 1952 (Showa 27), the Ministry of Education designated it as a Special Natural Monument.

In 2000, the Cultural Heritage Panel of the Executive Yuan designated Hokutolite as a Natural Cultural Landscape and established the Beitou River (Hokutolite) Nature Reserve, which was the first mineral in Taiwan to be included in the preservation designation.

On August 19, 2011, Beitou Hot Spring and Tamagawa Hot Spring became sister hot springs.

On December 26, 2013, the Taipei City Government established the Hokutolite Natural Reserve, the first instance in Taiwan where a local government set up a natural reserve to protect a mineral ore.
