= Tamagawa Hot Spring =

Hot spring in Akita Prefecture, Japan

Tamagawa Hot Spring 玉川温泉
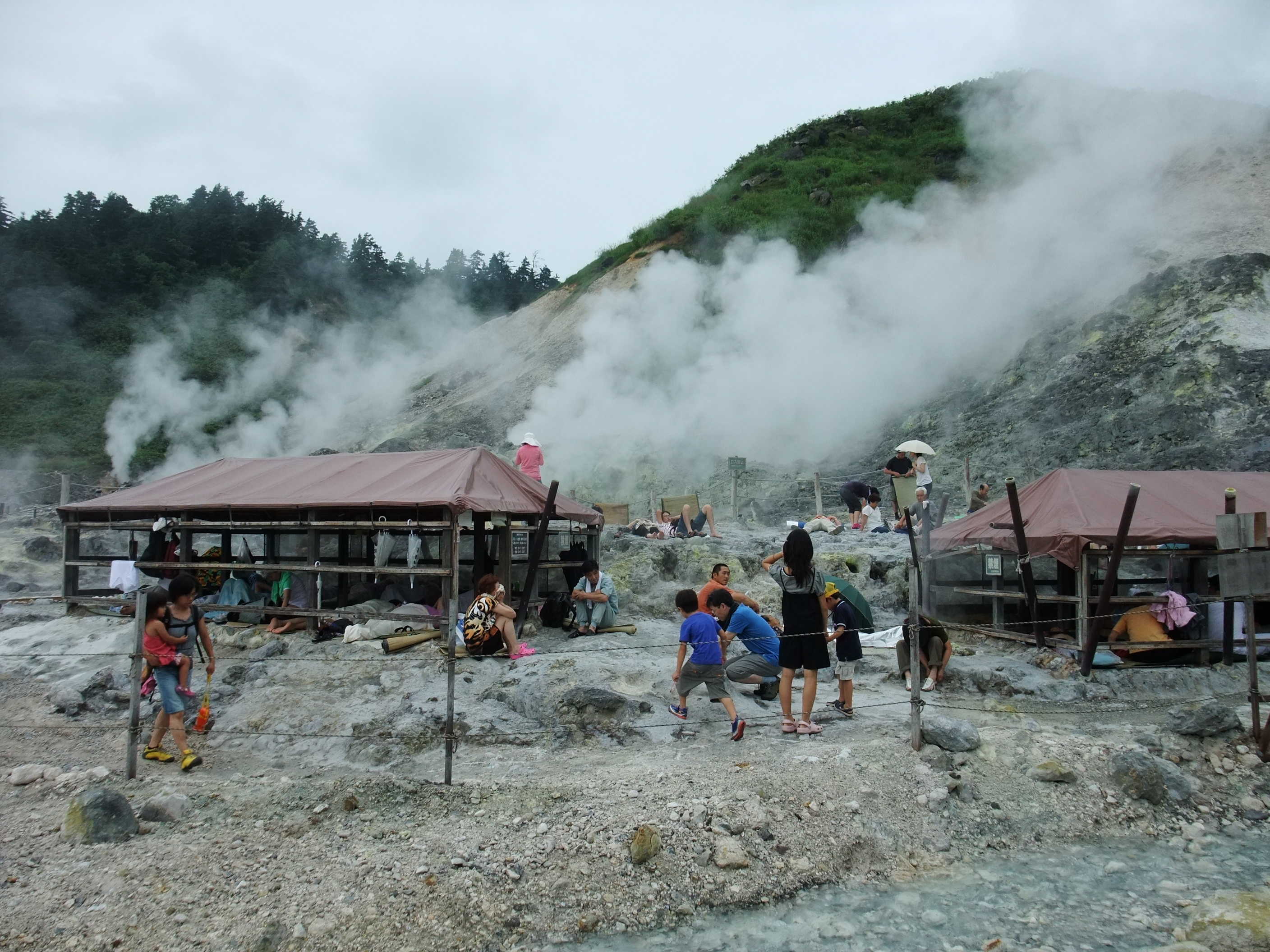
- Panorama view

- Location within Akita Prefecture Location within Japan
- Interactive map of Tamagawa Hot Spring 玉川温泉
- Location: Semboku, Akita, Japan
- Coordinates: 39°57′47.5″N 140°43′29″E
- Type: acidic saline
- Discharge: 9000 liters/min
- Temperature: 98.0 deg C

Tamagawa Hot Spring (玉川温泉, Tamagawa onsen) is a hot spring located in the city of Semboku, Akita in northern Japan.

== Water profile ==
The spring has a flow of 9000 liters/minute and feeds a 3-meter wide stream with a temperature of 98 °C. The water from Tamagawa Hot Spring is extremely acidic, with a pH of about 1.2, making it one of the most acidic hot springs in Japan.

== Spring overview ==
The spring contains hydrochloric acid as a main component, along with carbon dioxide, iron, and aluminum-chloride. Due to deposits of radioactive hokutolite near the spring, the water is also slightly radioactive, with a level of 15-20 mSv / year. Hokutolite is composed of a type of barite (barium sulfate), including lead and traces of strontium and calcium, and is about ten times as radioactive as the standard background radiation. Radium also exists in the hot springs water.

== History ==
The springs were discovered by a local matagi hunter in 1680, but the area was used primarily as a sulfur mine and it was not until 1885 that the first lodging was erected.

Initially called the Kanoyu Onsen, it was renamed to Tamagawa Onsen by an Asahi Shimbun reporter, who praised its effectiveness against many diseases. Due to the isolation of the site, it could only be reached on horseback with some difficulty until after World War II.

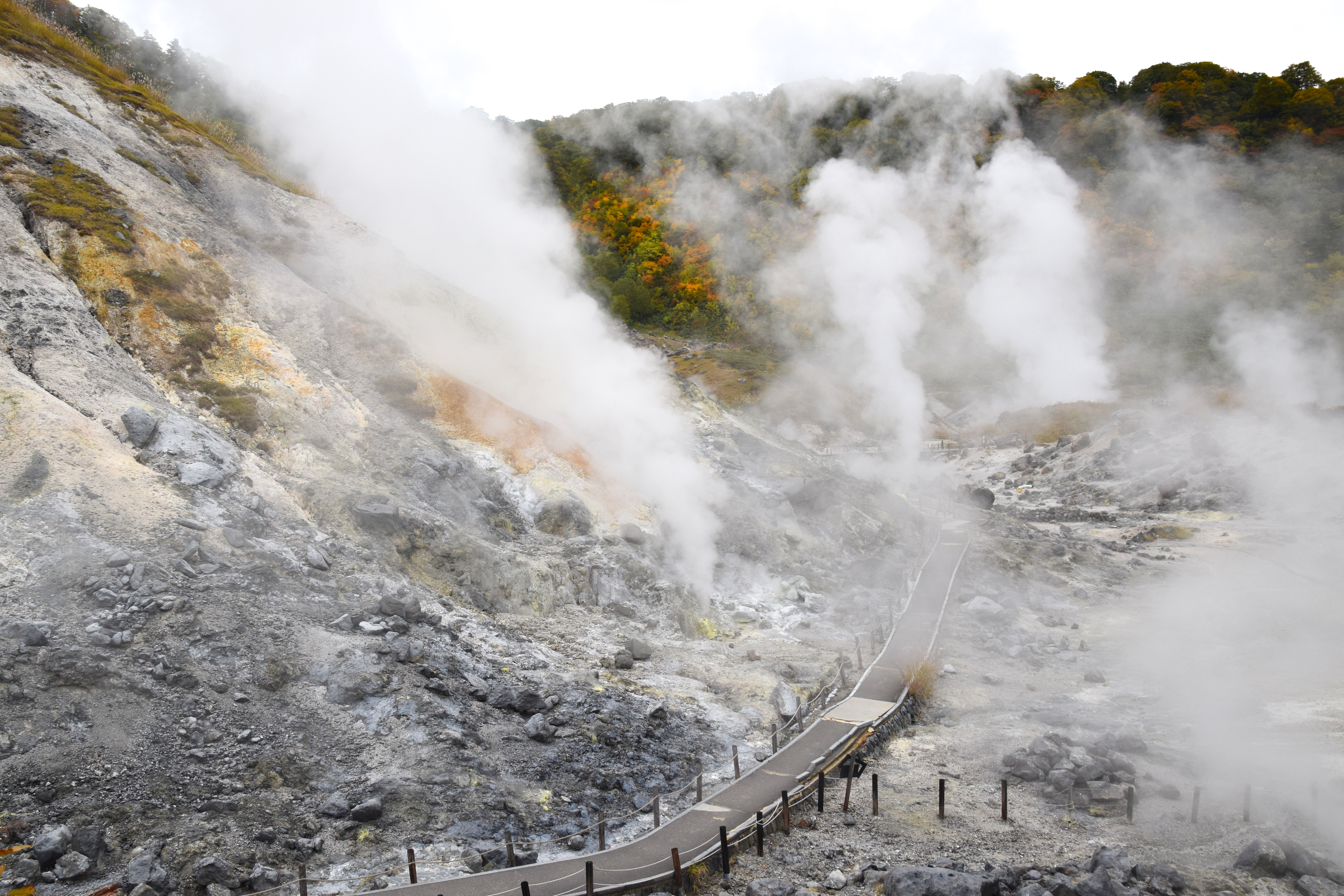
Sulphuric gasses at Tamagawa Onsen

It was designated a National Health Resort in 1959. The waters from the spring have traditionally been touted as a cure for hypertension, arteriosclerosis, gynecological diseases, neuralgia, skin diseases, asthma, and especially for malignant tumors (cancer).

There are two lodging facilities available in the area, Tamagawa Onsen, an inn located near the spring (opens from mid April to December, and closed for winter since 2012 due to the avalanche on February 1, 2012, which killed 3 people), and Shin-Tamagawa Onsen, a hotel about a kilometer down from the spring which opens year-round, run by the same owner of Tamagawa Onsen inn. Tamagawa Onsen inn and the spring area are only accessible by a snowcat in December after the road is closed for the traffic by the end of November due to the heavy snowfall in the area.
