= Okunoyama Kofun =

- 奥の山古墳 (Japanese)
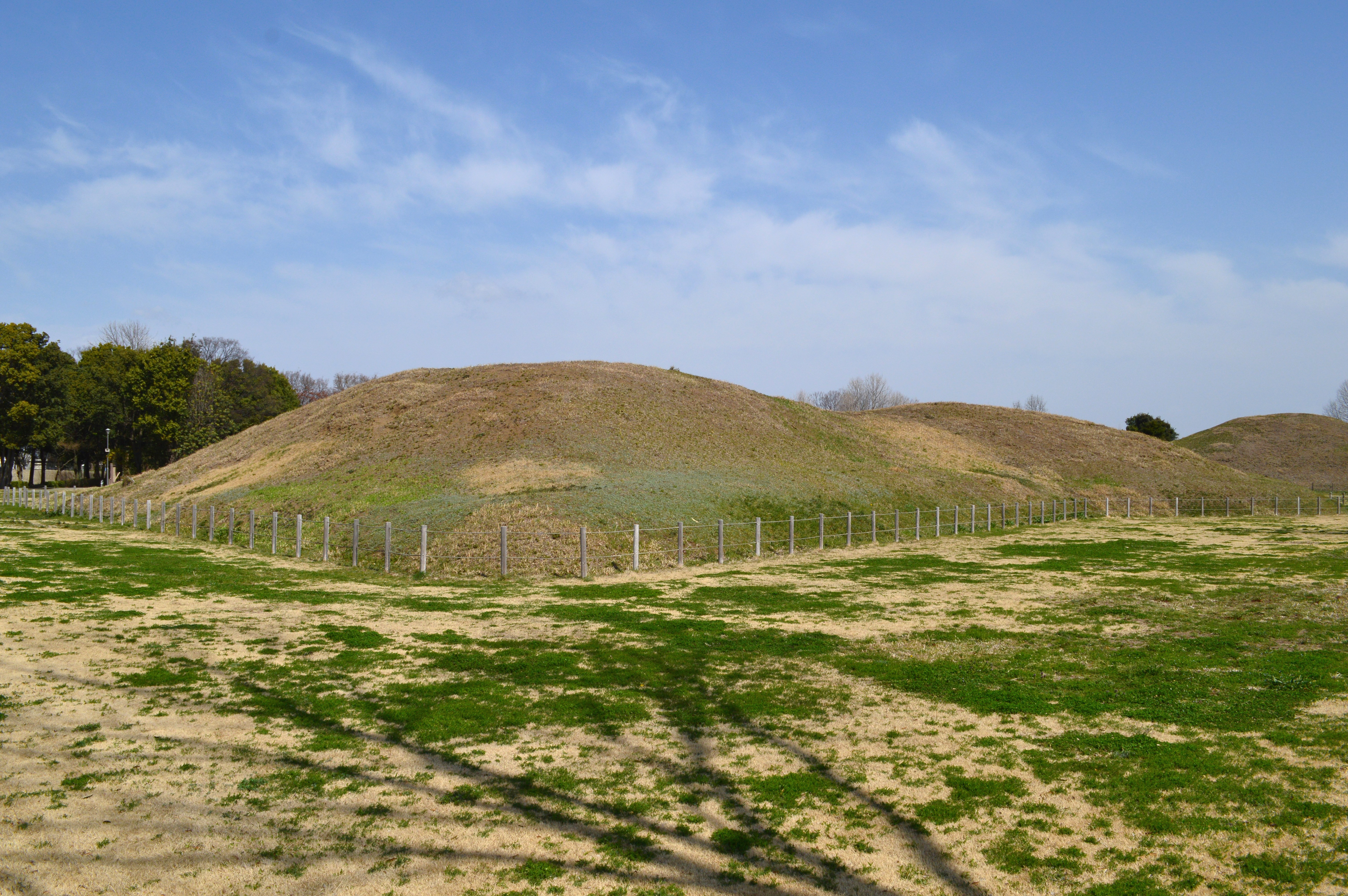
- Okunoyama Kofun

- Okunoyama Kofun Okunoyama Kofun (Japan)
- 36°7′22.4″N 139°28′37.59″E
- Type: Kofun
- Periods: Kofun period
- Location: Gyōda, Saitama, Japan
- Region: Kantō region

History
- Built: 6th century AD

Site notes
- Public access: Yes

The Okunoyama Kofun (奥の山古墳) is a kofun burial mound located in the city of Gyōda, Saitama Prefecture, in the Kantō region of Japan. The tumulus was designated a National Historic Site in 1938 and re-designated as a Special National Historic Site of Japan in 2020 as part of the Sakitama Kofun Cluster.

== Overview ==
The Okunoyama Kofun has a total length of 70 meters, and is thus the second smallest tumulus in the Saitama Kofun Cluster. It is a zenpō-kōen-fun (前方後円墳), which is shaped like a keyhole, having one square end and one circular end, when viewed from above. As with the other keyhole-shaped tumuli in this cluster, the Okunoyama Kofun had a rectangular double moat; however, part of the outer moat overlaps that of the adjacent Teppōyama Kofun, which was built slightly later. It is believed to have been built in the middle of the 6th century AD, based on haniwa excavated from the inner moat in 1968. These included cylindrical, horse-shaped, equestrian statue-shaped, and shield-bearer shaped haniwa.

In an excavation of the main tumulus in 2018, it was found that the middle bank in the southwest corner protrudes partly to the outside. This is a feature which also appears in the Inariyama Kofun, Gyōda Futagoyama Kofun, and Shogunyama Kofun in the Sakitama Kofun Group, but is rarely found in other locations. Called a "Tsukuridashi", the shield-bearer shaped haniwa were also found lined up on the southwestern corner, indicating that this location was of some especial ritual significance. Also of note was a decorated Sue ware jar, with a round-bottom and long-neck, together with three smaller jars of the same shape. These are thought to have been placed on an offering stand that was also excavated. There are very few examples of such Sue jars excavated in the Kantō region, and the fact that it was excavated from the second smallest burial mound towards the back of the cluster indicate that this tumulus had an importance greater than is reflected by its relatively small size.

Overall length
70 meters
Posterior circular portion
43 meter diameter x 6.8 meter high
Anterior rectangular portion
47 meters wide x 7.4 meters high

== See also ==
- List of Historic Sites of Japan (Saitama)
