= Sakitama Kofun Cluster =

Saikitama Kofun Cluster
- 埼玉古墳群 (Japanese)
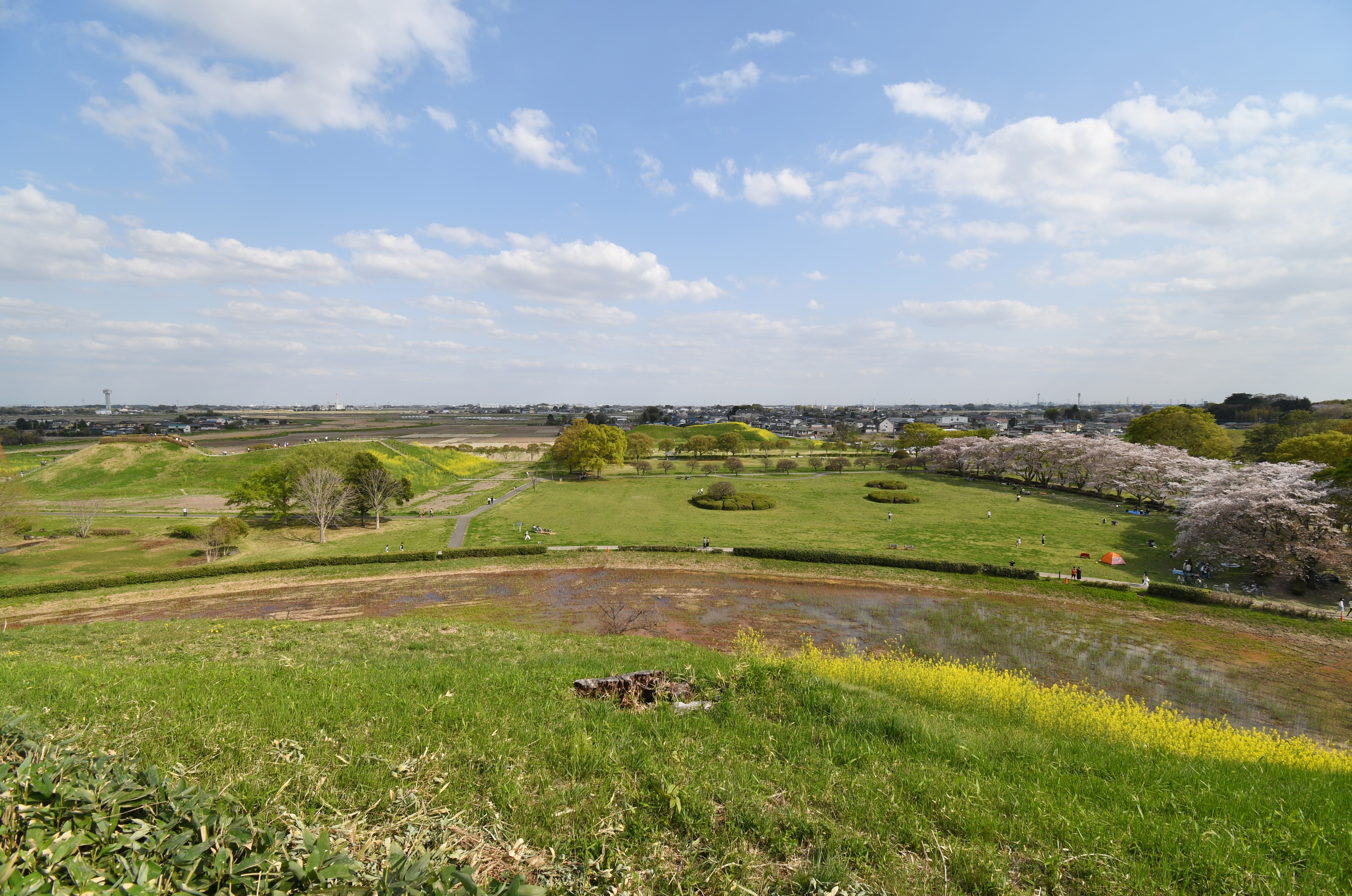
- Saikitama Kofun Cluster

- Saikitama Kofun Cluster Sakitama Kofun Cluster (Japan)
- 35°07′42″N 139°28′36″E
- Type: kofun
- Periods: Kofun period
- Location: Gyōda, Saitama, Japan
- Region: Kantō region

History
- Built: 5th to 7th centuries AD

Site notes
- Public access: Yes (museum)

The Saikitama Kofun Cluster (埼玉古墳群, Sakitama kofun-gun) is a group of burial mounds located in the city of Gyōda, Saitama Prefecture, in the Kantō region of Japan. The site was designated a National Historic Site in 1938, and was upgraded in status to a Special National Historic Site of Japan in 2020. The site consists of nine large kofun, which were built in the 5th to 7th centuries AD, i.e. from the late Kofun period into the Asuka period, when the construction of burial mounds was already out of fashion in western Japan.

== Overview ==
The area of "Sakitama" is the area which gave its name to become modern Saitama Prefecture. The site now consists of eight large zenpō-kōen-fun (前方後円墳), which are shaped like a keyhole, having one square end and one circular end, when viewed from above, and one large circular-type (empun (円墳)) kofun. However, the area formerly included an additional 35 smaller circular-type kofun and one more square-type (hōfun (方墳)), all of which have now been destroyed by urban encroachment and land development.

According to the Nihon Shoki chronicle, in 534 AD, Emperor Ankan appointed Nao Kasahara as Kuni no miyatsuko after he won a succession battle in Musashi Province for that post, and miraculously a keyhole-shaped tomb appeared in Kasahara, Saitama Country (present-day Konosu, Saitama) overnight, indicating the favor of the Yamato kingdom. This has led to a theory that the Musashi Kokufu was originally in this location, although the ruins of a provincial capital have been found in southern Musashi in the city of Kokubunji, Tokyo. In any event, the tumuli in this area date from the end of the 5th century to the 7th century AD. The existence of these tumuli were known in the Edo period and were commented upon in local histories, such as the "Shinpen Musashi Fudoki".

In 1893, the Shōgunyama Kofun was excavated and in 1935 a survey of the area indicated that 11 keyhole-shaped and 11 circular-type mounds existed. In 1938, nine largest burial mounds were designated as national historic sites. Maintenance on these tumuli began in 1966, and in 1968, then Inariyama Kofun was excavated, revealing a gold-inlaid iron sword (the Inariyama Sword). The area was developed into the Sakitama Kofun Park (さきたま風土記の丘, Sakitama Fudoki no Oka), and in addition to the tumuli, a number of traditional minka farm houses were relocated to the historic park for preservation. A museum, the Saitama Prefectural Museum of the Sakitama Ancient Burial Mounds (埼玉県立さきたま史跡の博物館, Saitama Kenritsu Sakitama Shiseki no Hakubutsukan) was also opened.

Saitama Prefecture and the city of Gyōda are promoting the site for inclusion as a UNESCO World Heritage Site, as a preliminary step, the site's designation was changed from a National Heritage Site to a Special National Heritage Site in 2020.

== List of kofun ==
Name	Length [m]	width[m]	Height [m]	Coordinates
Maruhakayama Kofun (丸墓山古墳)	105	≈100	18,9	36°7′45″N 139°28′42″E
Inariyama Kofun (稲荷山古墳)	120	74	11,7	36°7′45″N 139°28′50″E
Gyōda Futagoyama Kofun (行田二子山古墳)	138	90	13,0	36°7′34″N 139°28′44″E
Teppōyama Kofun (鉄砲山古墳)	109	69	9,0	36°7′25.5″N 139°28′40.5″E
Shōgunyama Kofun (将軍山古墳)	90	68	≥8,2	36°7′38″N 139°28′52″E
Nakanoyama Kofun (中の山古墳)	79	44	5,1	36°7′20″N 139°28′41.5″E
Kawarazuka Kofun (瓦塚古墳)	73	47	5,1	36°7′29″N 139°28′36″E
Okunoyama Kofun (奥の山古墳)	66	40	5,6	36°7′22″N 139°28′37.5″E
Atagoyama Kofun (愛宕山古墳)	53	30	3,4	36°7′34″N 139°28′36.5″E

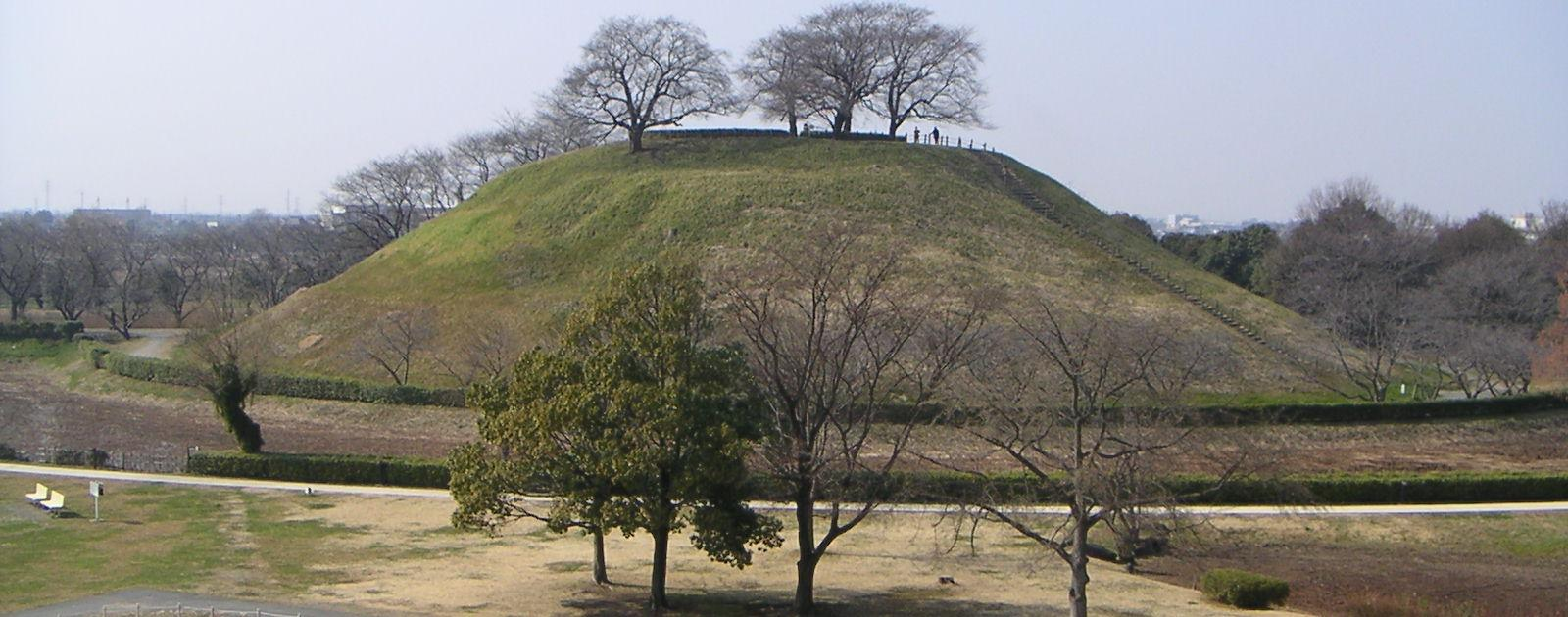
Maruhakayama Kofun

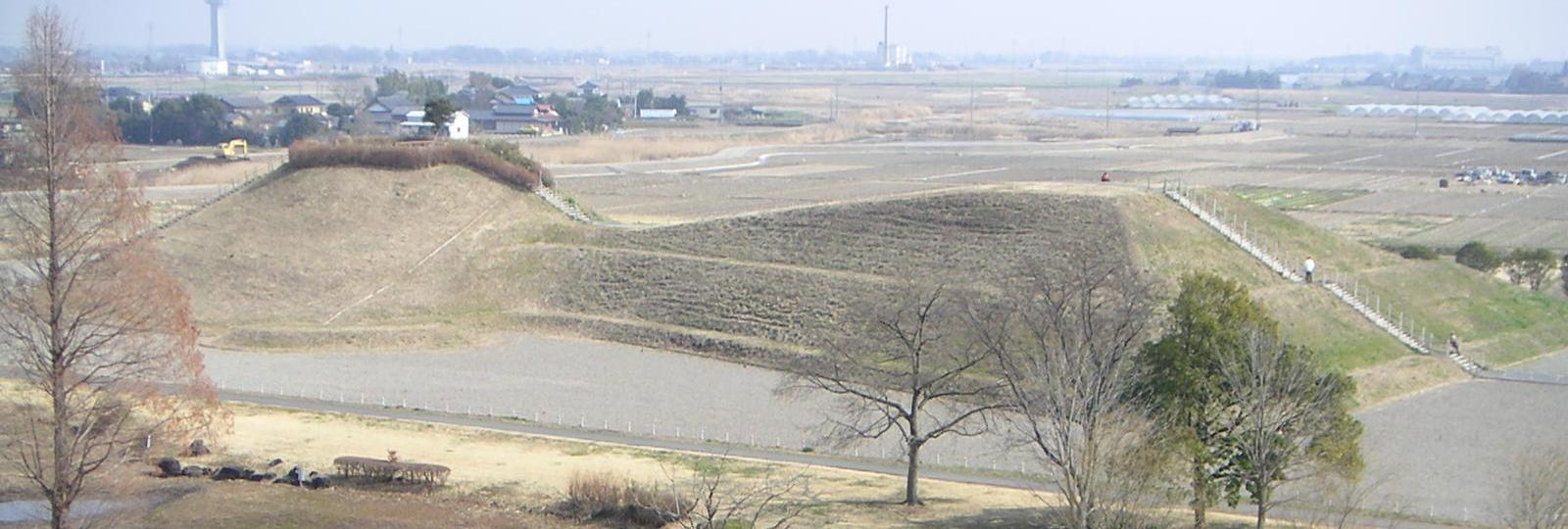
Inariyama Kofun

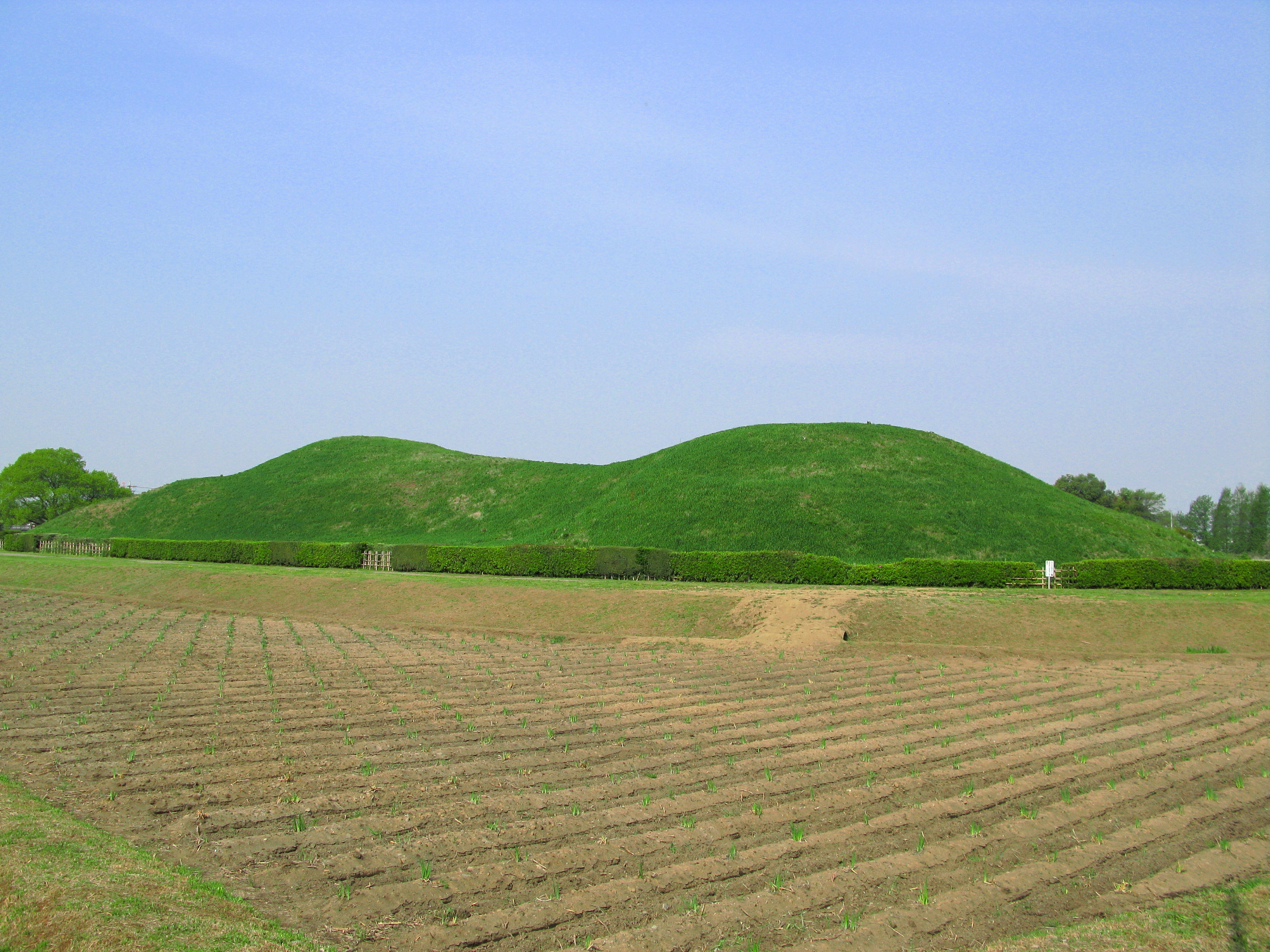
Gyōda Futagoyama Kofun

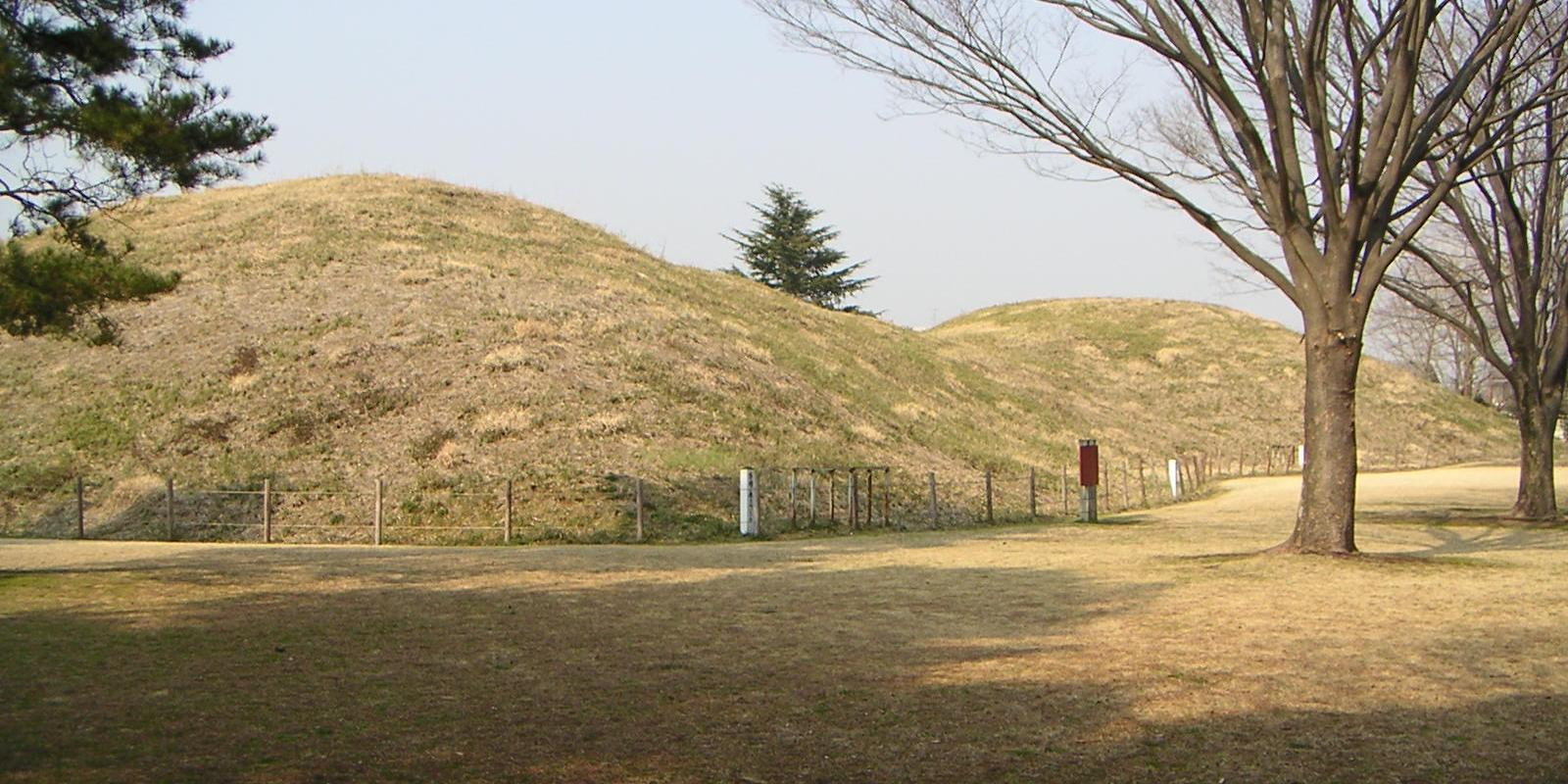
Teppōyama Kofun

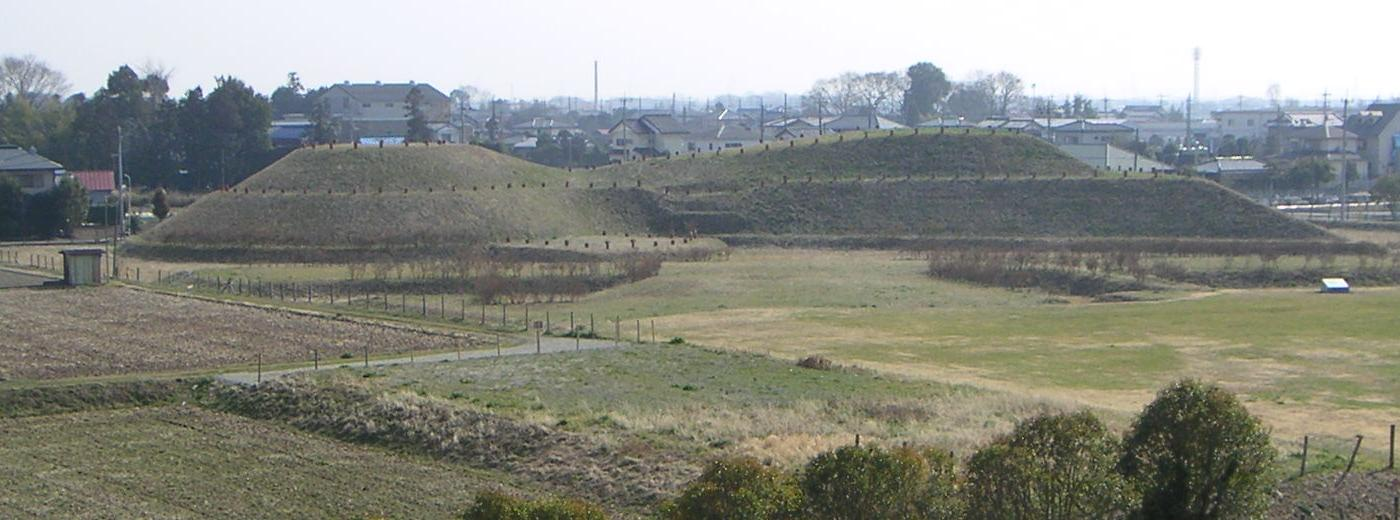
Shogunyama Kofun

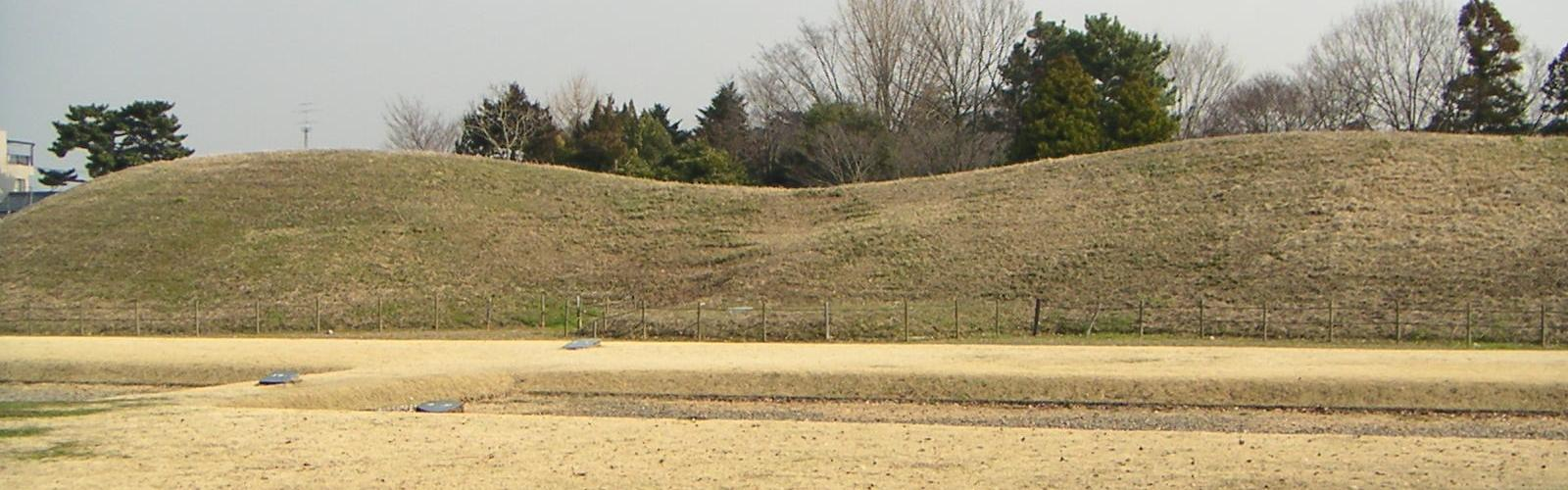
Kawarazuka Kofun

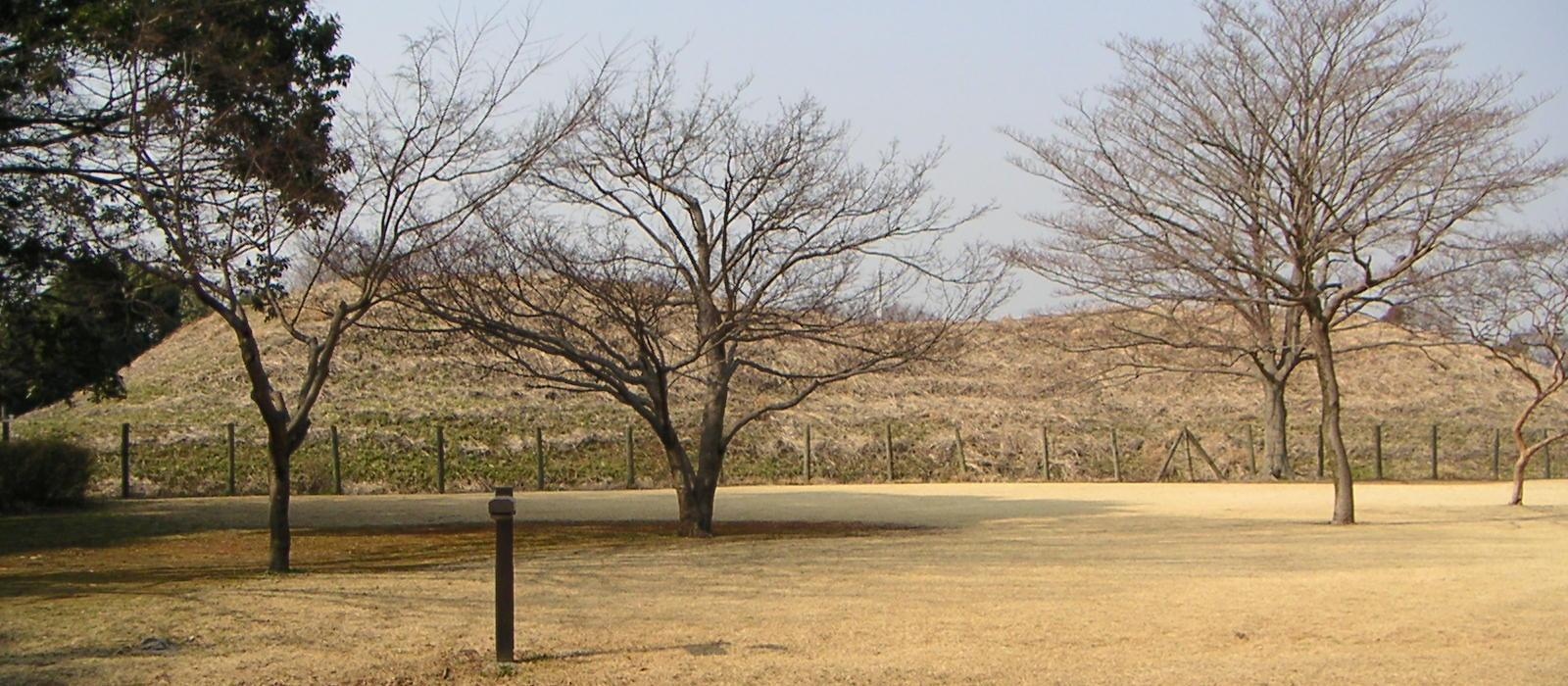
Okunoyama Kofun

== See also ==
- List of Historic Sites of Japan (Saitama)
