= Kawarazuka Kofun =

Kofun burial mound in Japan

- 瓦塚古墳 (Japanese)
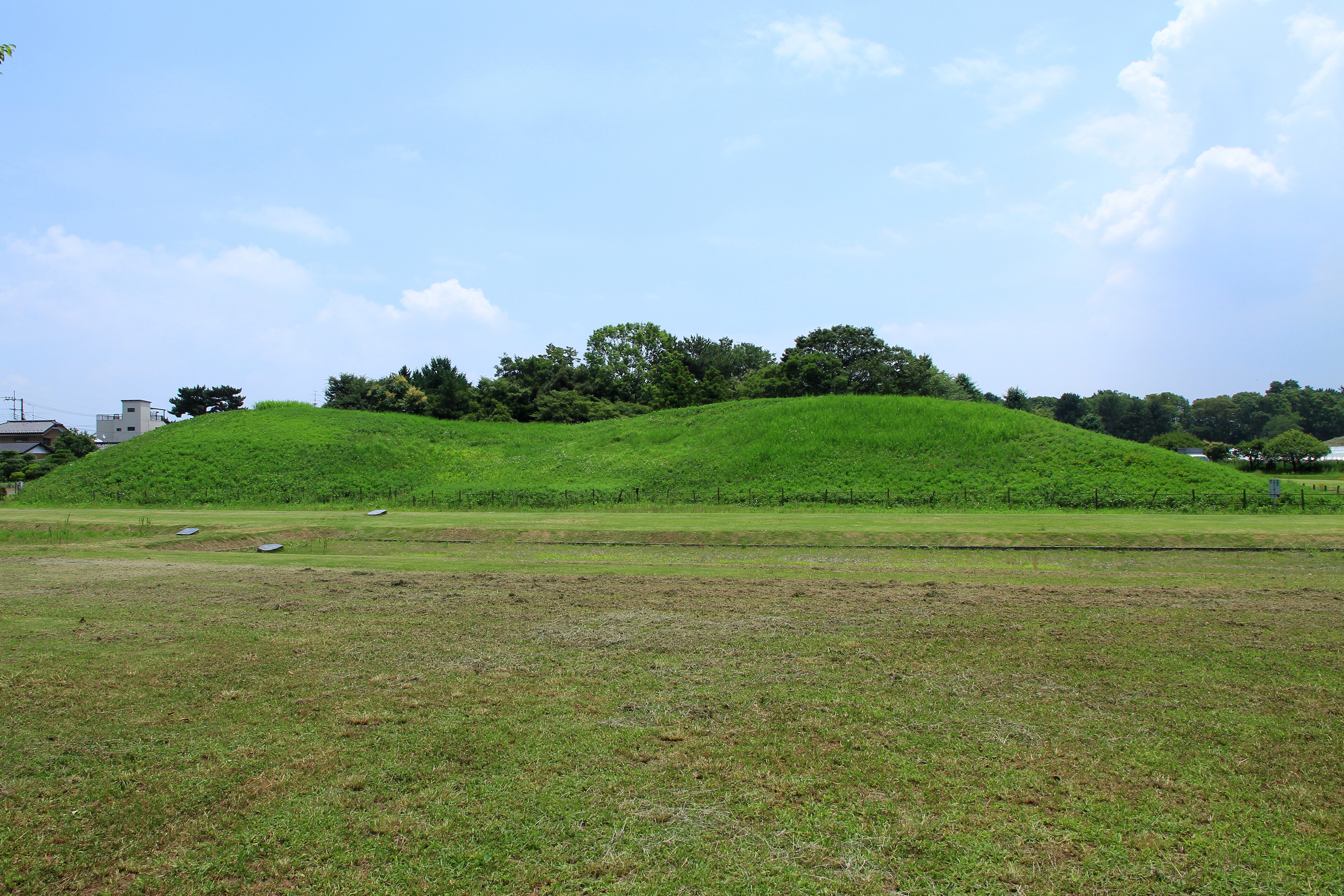
- Kawarazuka Kofun

- Kawarazuka Kofun Kawarazuka Kofun (Japan)
- 36°7′29.62″N 139°28′37.6″E
- Type: Kofun
- Periods: Kofun period
- Location: Gyōda, Saitama, Japan
- Region: Kantō region

History
- Built: 6th-7th century AD

Site notes
- Public access: Yes

The Kawarazuka Kofun (瓦塚古墳) is a kofun burial mound located in the city of Gyōda, Saitama Prefecture, in the Kantō region of Japan. The tumulus was designated a National Historic Site in 1938 and re-designated as a Special National Historic Site of Japan in 2020 as part of the Sakitama Kofun Cluster.

== Overview ==
The Kawarazuka Kofun has a total length of 73 meters, and is the sixth largest tumulus in the Saitama Kofun Cluster. It is a zenpō-kōen-fun (前方後円墳), which is shaped like a keyhole, having one square end and one circular end, when viewed from above. As with the other keyhole-shaped tumuli in this cluster, the Kawarazuka Kofun had a rectangular double moat. A large number of haniwa have beenexcavated from this tumulus, including haniwa shaped as houses, waterfowl, men with shields, boys playing musical instruments leading horses, and girls with necklaces, from which a glimpse of the clothes, hairstyles, and festivals of the Kofun period can be deduced. The tumulus dates from the first half of the 6th century AD.

The tumulus has been reconstructed, and is located immediately in front of the Saitama Prefectural Museum of the Sakitama Ancient Burial Mounds (埼玉県立さきたま史跡の博物館, Saitama Kenritsu Sakitama Shiseki no Hakubutsukan) .

Overall length
73 meters
Posterior circular portion
36.5 meter diameter x 5.1 meter high
Anterior rectangular portion
47 meters wide x 4.9 meters high

== See also ==
- List of Historic Sites of Japan (Saitama)
