= Atagoyama Kofun =

Kofun period burial mound in Gyōda, Japan

- 愛宕山古墳 (Japanese)
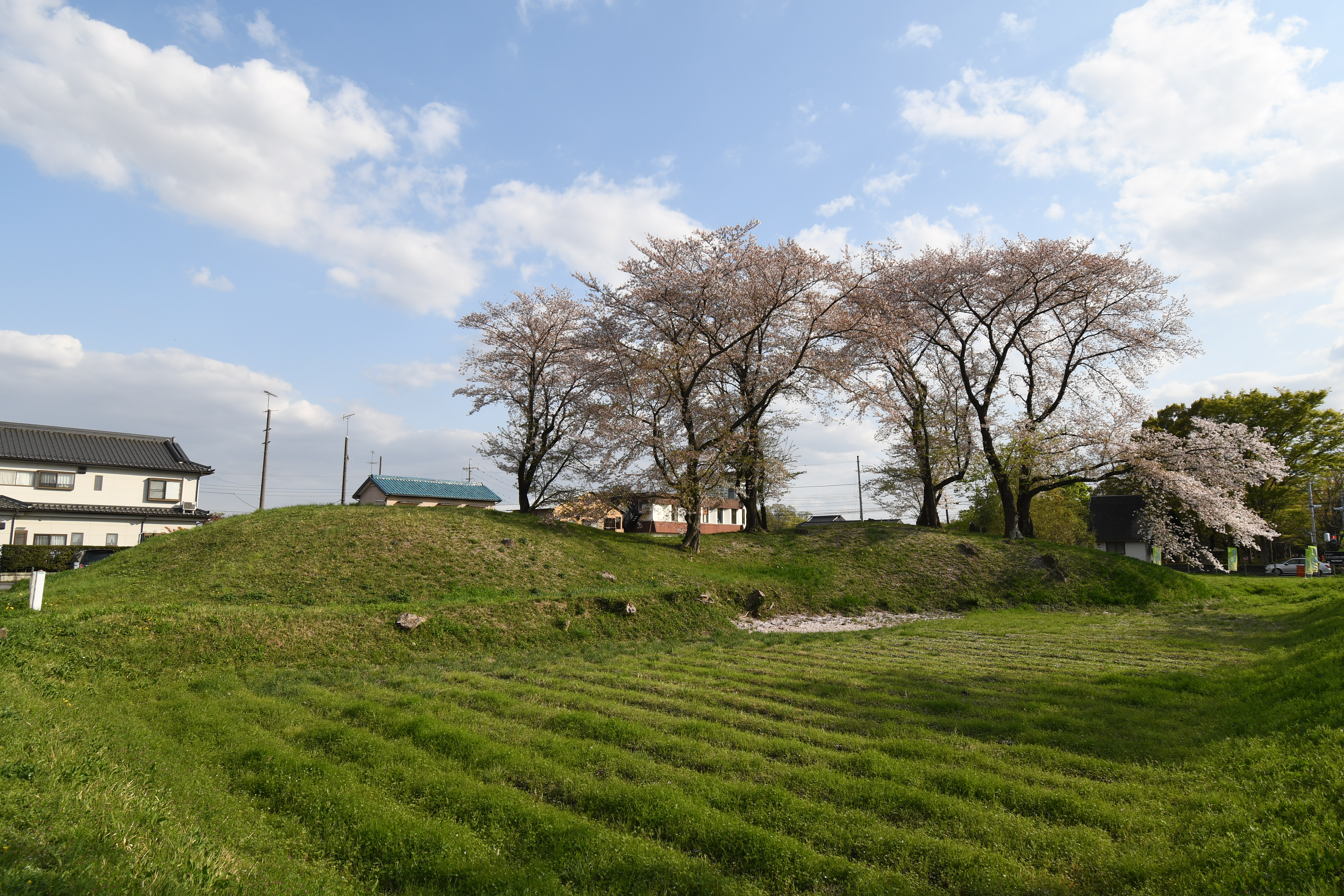
- Atagoyama Kofun

- Atagoyama Kofun Atagoyama Kofun (Japan)
- 36°7′34.7″N 139°28′37.1″E
- Type: Kofun
- Periods: Kofun period
- Location: Gyōda, Saitama, Japan
- Region: Kantō region

History
- Built: 6th-7th century AD

Site notes
- Public access: Yes

The Atagoyama Kofun (愛宕山古墳) is a kofun burial mound located in the city of Gyōda, Saitama Prefecture, in the Kantō region of Japan. The tumulus was designated a National Historic Site in 1938 and re-designated as a Special National Historic Site of Japan in 2020 as part of the Sakitama Kofun Cluster.

== Overview ==
The Atagoyama Kofun has a total length of 53 meters, and is the smallest tumulus in the Saitama Kofun Cluster. It is a zenpō-kōen-fun (前方後円墳), which is shaped like a keyhole, having one square end and one circular end, when viewed from above. As with the other keyhole-shaped tumuli in this cluster, the Atagoyama Kofun had a rectangular double moat. A large number of haniwa have been excavated from this tumulus, including haniwa shaped as cylinders, "morning-glory", houses, horses, men with swords, and other male figures. The tumulus dates from the middle of the 6th century AD. The burial chamber has not been excavated as the mound was in very poor repair and was in danger of collapsing. Its name comes from an Atago Shrine which was once located on the tumulus.

The Atagoyama Kofun is near the parking lot to the Sakitama Kofun archaeological park, and is adjacent to the Gyōda Futagoyama Kofun, the largest kofun in the cluster.

Overall length
53 meters
Posterior circular portion
30 meter diameter x 3.4 meter high
Anterior rectangular portion
30 meters wide x 3.3 meters high

== See also ==
- List of Historic Sites of Japan (Saitama)
