= Inariyama Kofun =

Burial mound in Gyōda, Saitama, Japan

- 稲荷山古墳 (Japanese)
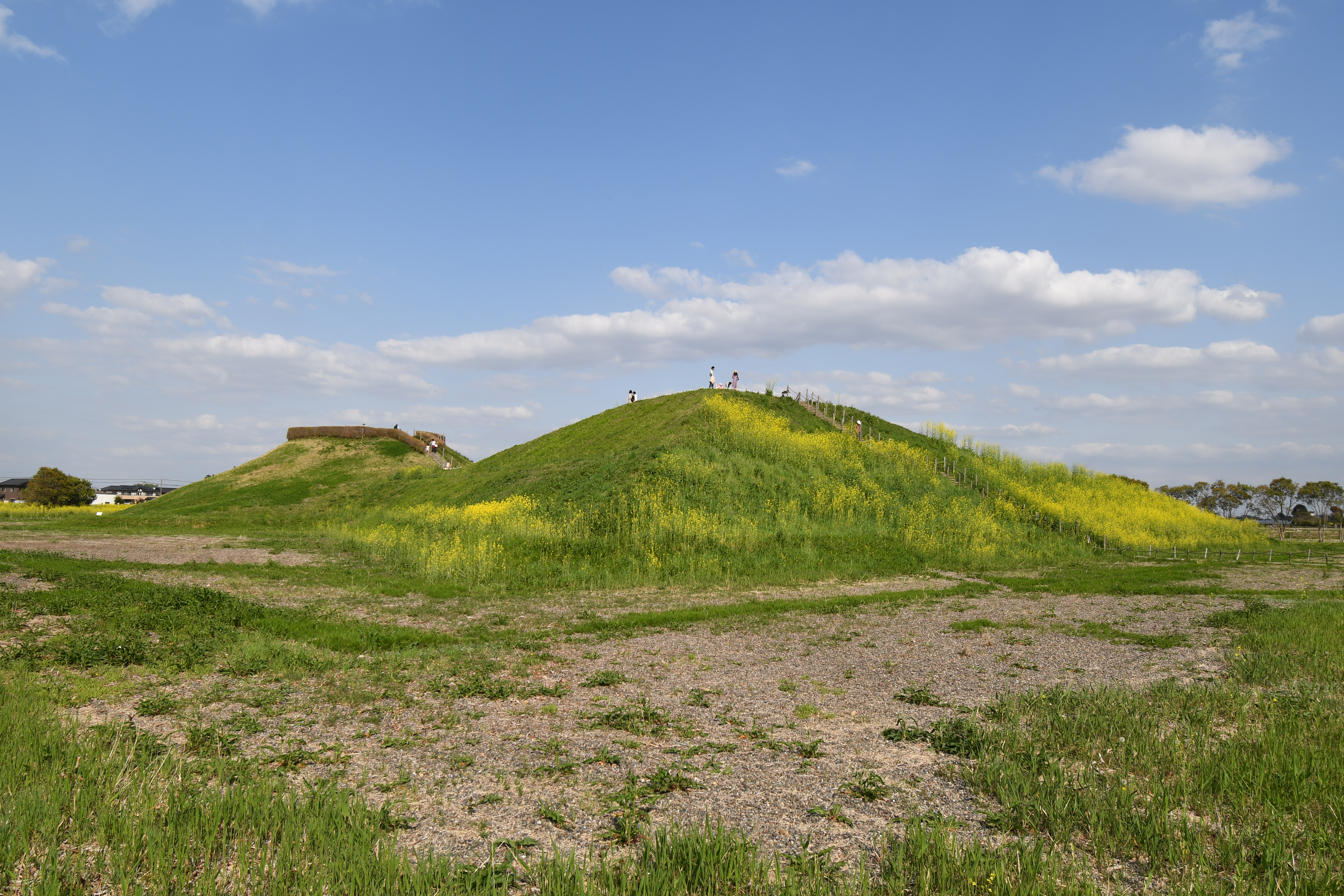
- Inariyama Kofun

- Inariyama Kofun Inariyama Kofun (Japan)
- 36°7′45.81″N 139°28′51.66″E
- Type: Kofun
- Periods: Kofun period
- Location: Gyōda, Saitama, Japan
- Region: Kantō region

History
- Built: 5th century AD

Site notes
- Public access: Yes

The Inariyama Kofun (稲荷山古墳) is a kofun burial mound located in the city of Gyōda, Saitama Prefecture, in the Kantō region of Japan. The tumulus was designated a National Historic Site in 1938 and re-designated as a Special National Historic Site of Japan in 2020 as part of the Sakitama Kofun Cluster. It is also referred to as the Sakitama Inariyama Kofun (埼玉稲荷山古墳) or the Gyōda Inariyama Kofun (行田稲荷山古墳) to disambiguate it from other tumuli using the name of "Inariyama" in other parts of the country.

== Overview ==
The Inariyama Kofun has a total length of 120 meters, and is thus the second largest tumulus in the Saitama Kofun Cluster. The construction period is thought to be the latter half of the 5th century, the latter part of the Kofun period. It was the first to be built in the Saitama Kofun cluster. The tumulus is a zenpō-kōen-fun (前方後円墳), which is shaped like a keyhole, having one square end and one circular end, when viewed from above. Proportionately, it is a one-quarter scale version of the Tomb of Emperor Nintoku in Sakai, Osaka. The Gyōda Futagoyama Kofun and the Teppōyama Kofun are also built to these same proportions, albeit on a smaller scale, and since the Inariyama Kofun was built earlier, it must have served as the template for these later burial mounds. The main axis of the tumulus is aligned in the direction of Mount Fuji, approximately 100 kilometers away, and which can be seen from the summit of the posterior circular portion.

The mound is built in two steps, and there is no evidence that fukiishi were used. As with most other tumuli at this site, it has a double rectangular moat. The depth of the moat is estimated to be about 1.8 meters from the ground surface at the time of construction, and were dry moats, but accumulated water when the water level rose. The anterior portion of the tumulus was demolished as landfill soil during the reclamation work of the surrounding swamps in 1937. Archaeological excavations explored the burial chamber in 1968 and the surrounding moat in 1973. A portion of the inner moat was restored in 1976. The tumulus was in very poor condition and in danger of collapse until restoration work was performed in 2003. Investigations with a ground penetrating radar in 2016 showed that there are other unexcavated chambers in the burial mound.

An unusual feature of this tumulus is a protrusion extending from the western side of the tumulus, near the joint between the rectangular and circular portions. This is a feature which also appears in the Gyōda Futagoyama Kofun, Teppōyama Kofun and Shogunyama Kofun in the Sakitama Kofun Group, but is rarely found in other locations. Called a "Tsukuridashi", it was apparently a platform used for rituals.

The burial chamber contained a wooden coffin that was surrounded by a clay wrap resting on a layer of gravel. Artifacts included iron swords, a bronze mirror, magatama, two silver rings, bronze and gold metal fittings, fragments of armor and horse harnesses. The excavated items were designated as an Important Cultural Property in 1981 and a National Treasure in 1983. Due to the rich grave goods, it very likely that the buried person was a high-ranking figure who was related to the Yamato court. The most important find within the burial chamber was an iron sword with a gold-inlay inscription. Known as the Inariyama Sword, the inscription gives a date of either 471AD or 531AD and the name of the person buried in the tomb as "Wowake".The sword is held in Saitama Prefectural Museum of the Sakitama Ancient Burial Mounds (埼玉県立さきたま史跡の博物館). The inscription also mentions a person named "Ōhatsuse-wakatakeru-no-mikoto" who is mentioned in the Nihon Shoki, as an alias of Emperor Yūryaku. It is unknown if "Wowake" was a local ruler, or was someone who had been dispatched by the Yamato kingdom to rule over this year, but from the design of the tumulus and its grave goods, the connection with western Japan was very strong.

Overall length
120 meters
Posterior circular portion
62 meter diameter x 11.7 meter high
Anterior rectangular portion
74 meters wide x 10.7 meters high

== Gallery ==
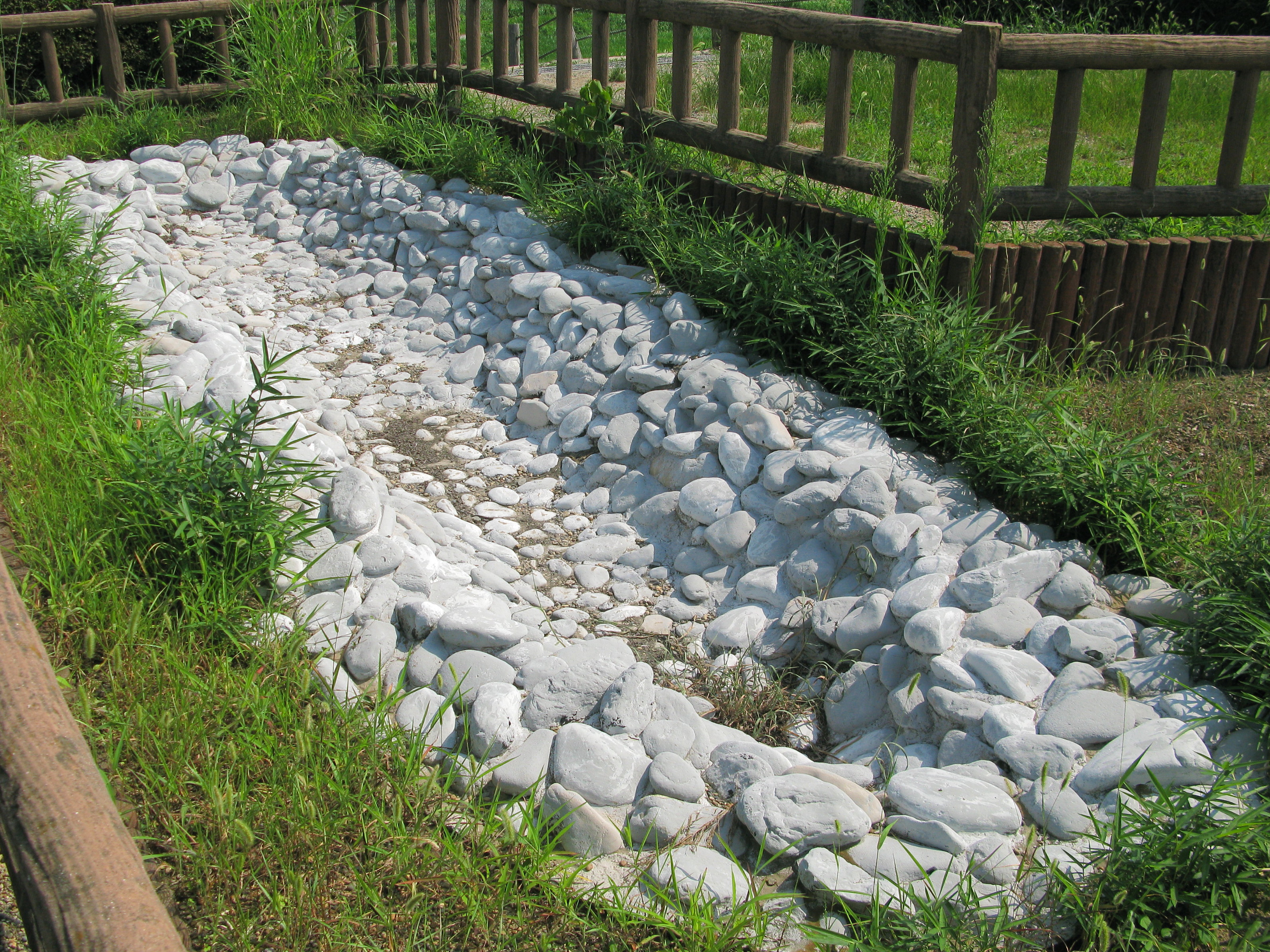
Reconstruction of burial chamber floor

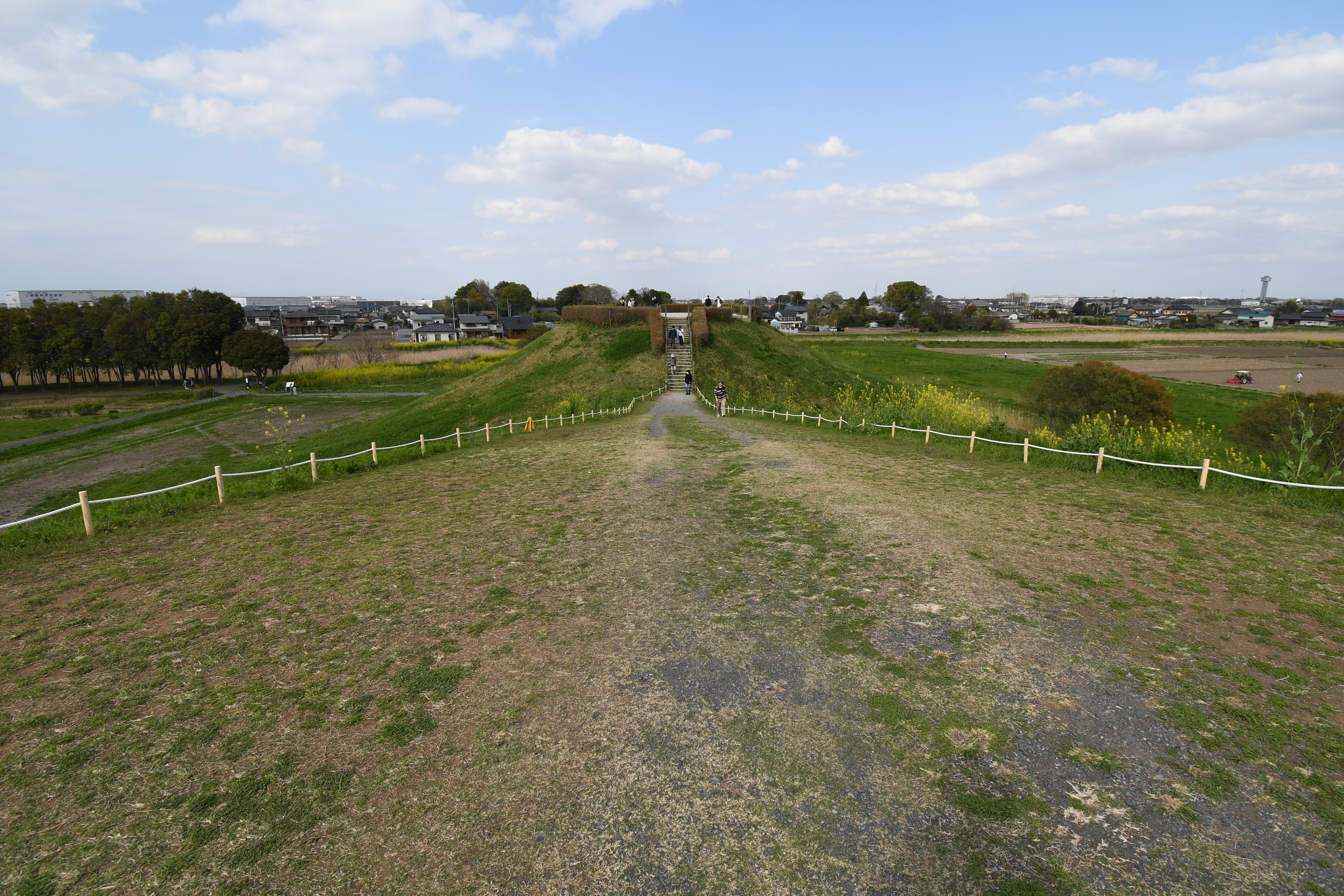
posteior towards anterior

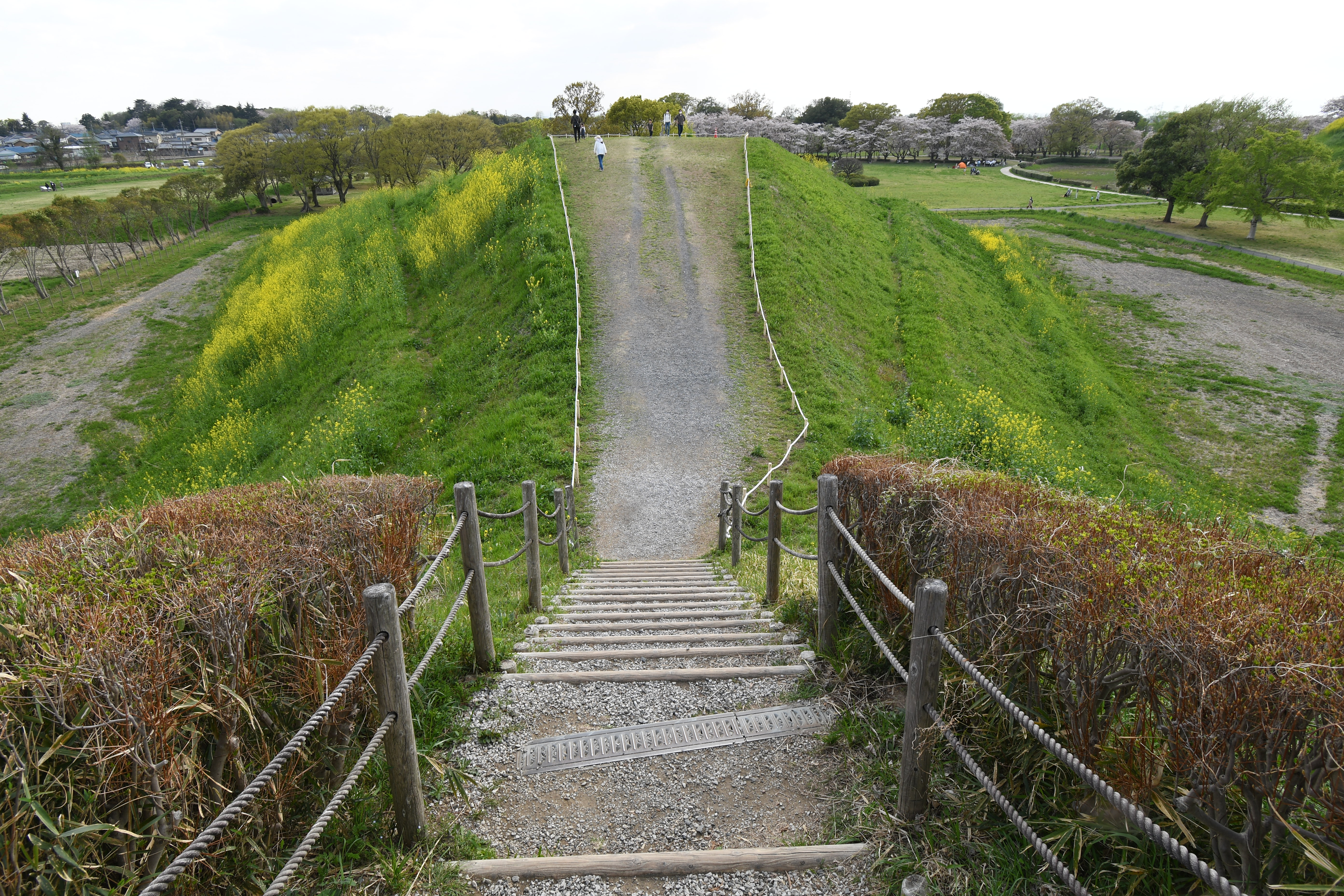
anterior towards posterior

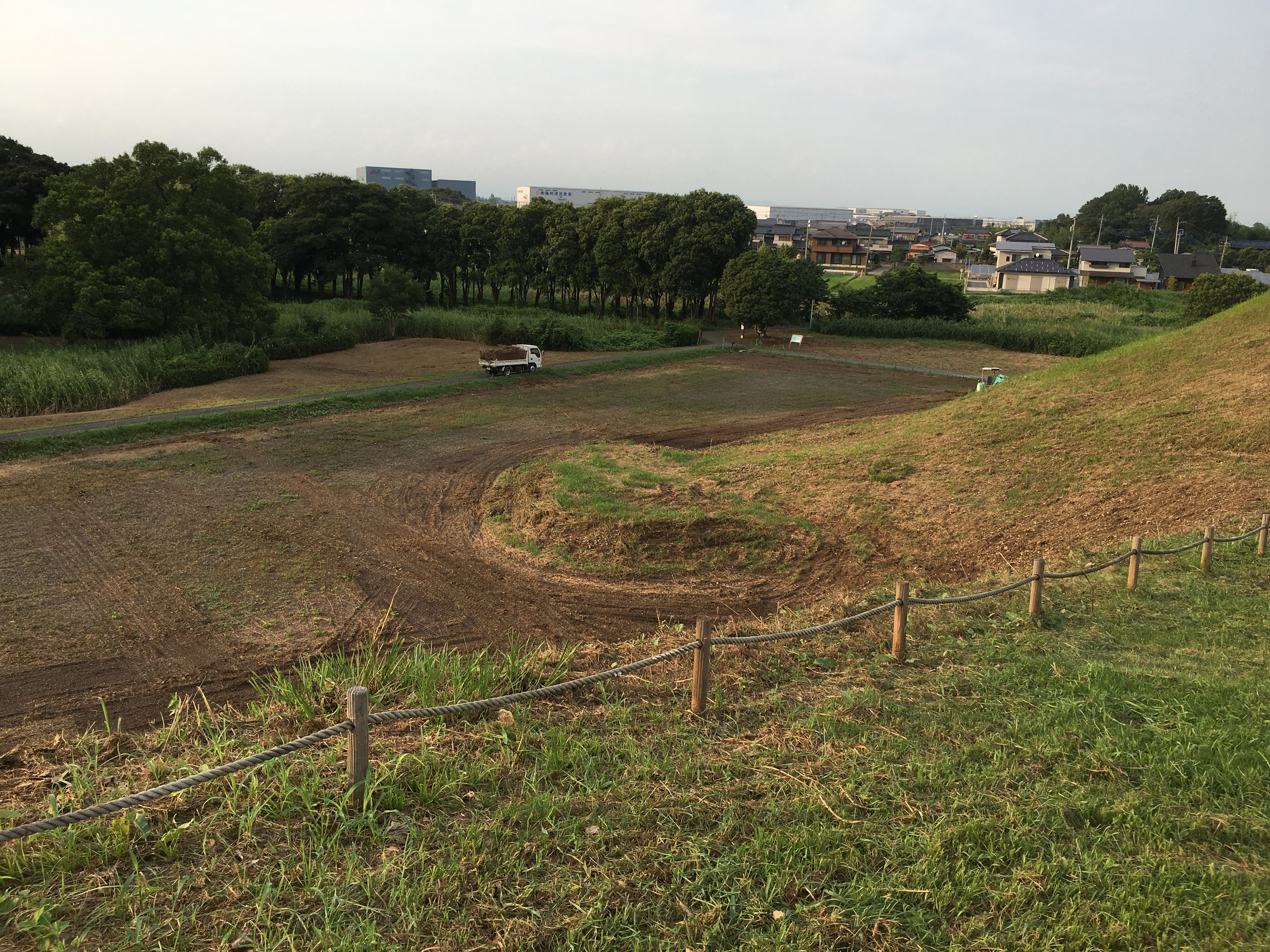
Tsukuridashi

== See also ==
- List of Historic Sites of Japan (Saitama)
