= Maruhakayama Kofun =

Kofun period burial mound in Gyōda, Japan

- 丸墓山古墳 (Japanese)
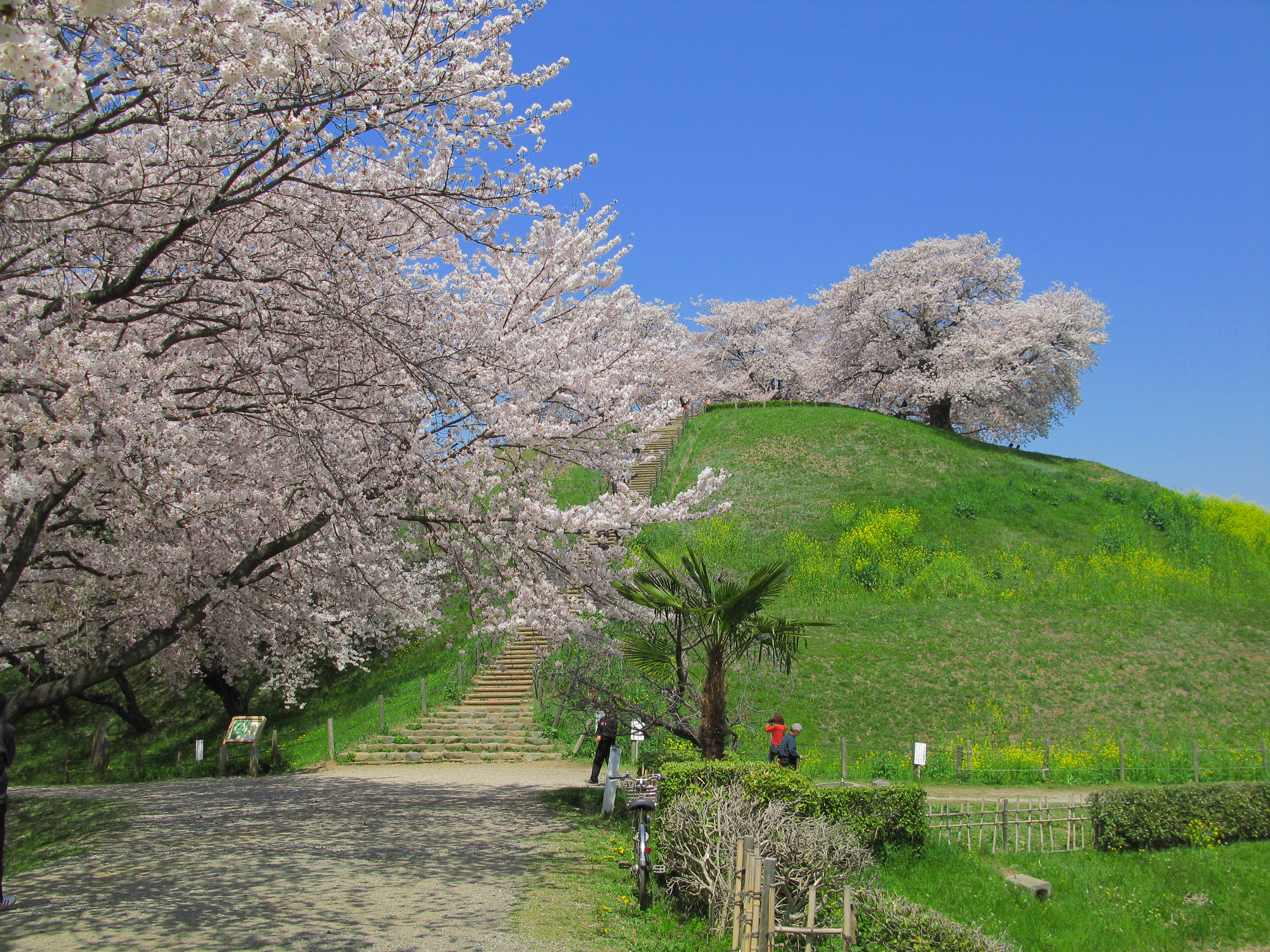
- Maruhakayama Kofun

- Maruhakayama Kofun Maruhakayama Kofun (Japan)
- 36°7′45.51″N 139°28′42.62″E
- Type: Kofun
- Periods: Kofun period
- Location: Gyōda, Saitama, Japan
- Region: Kantō region

History
- Built: 6th century AD

Site notes
- Public access: Yes

The Maruhakayama Kofun (丸墓山古墳) is a kofun burial mound located in the city of Gyōda, Saitama Prefecture, in the Kantō region of Japan. The tumulus was designated a National Historic Site in 1938 and re-designated as a Special National Historic Site of Japan in 2020 as part of the Sakitama Kofun Cluster.

== Overview ==
The Maruhakayama Kofun is a circular-type (empun (円墳)) kofun with a diameter of 105 meters and height of 18.9 meters, and is thus one of the largest circular tumuli in Japan. Archaeological excavations have not been conducted and details of the burial chamber are unknown. The surface of the tumulus appears to have been covered only in fukiishi, with no haniwa shards having been discovered, and from this it is estimated that the tumulus was built in the early 6th century AD. From 1985 to 1986, maintenance work was conducted on the top and east side of the mound, and on a portion of the moat.

In 1590, during Toyotomi Hideyoshi's campaign against the Odawara Hōjō, Ishida Mitsunari established his field headquarters on top of this tumulus, constructing a semi-circular embankment as part of the Siege of Oshi Castle, which is just visible from the top of the mound.

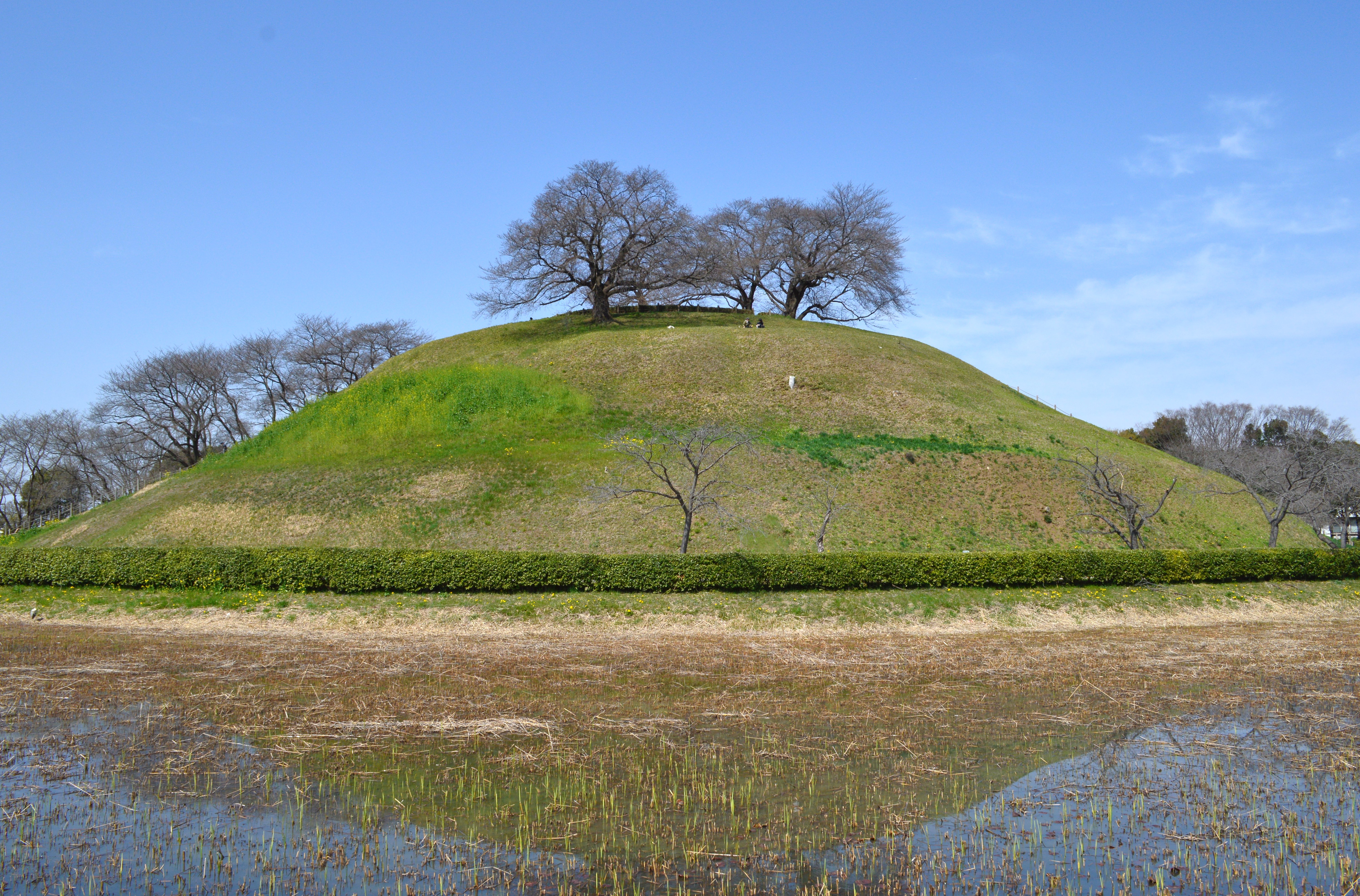
Panoramic view

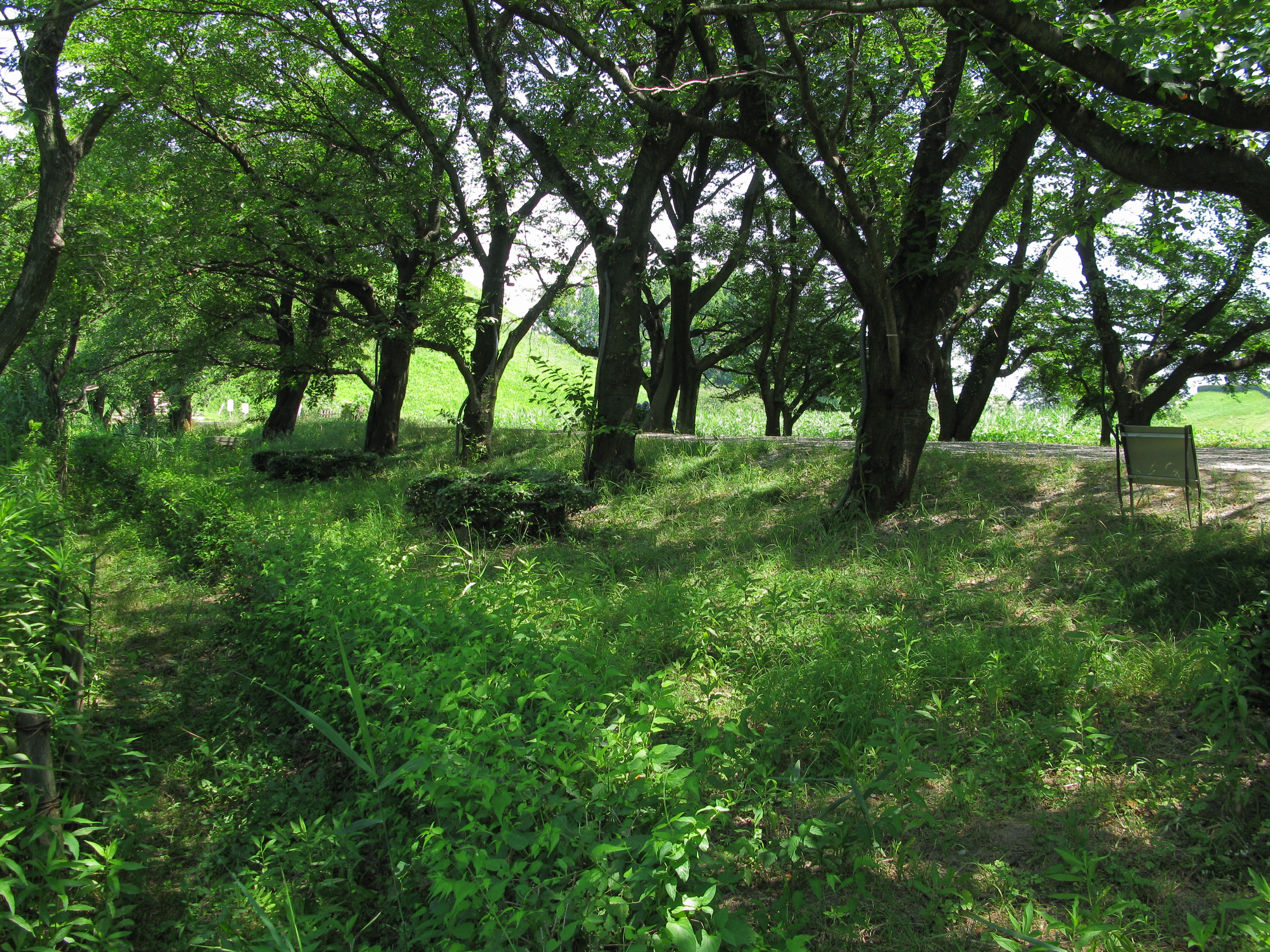
Ishida Embankment

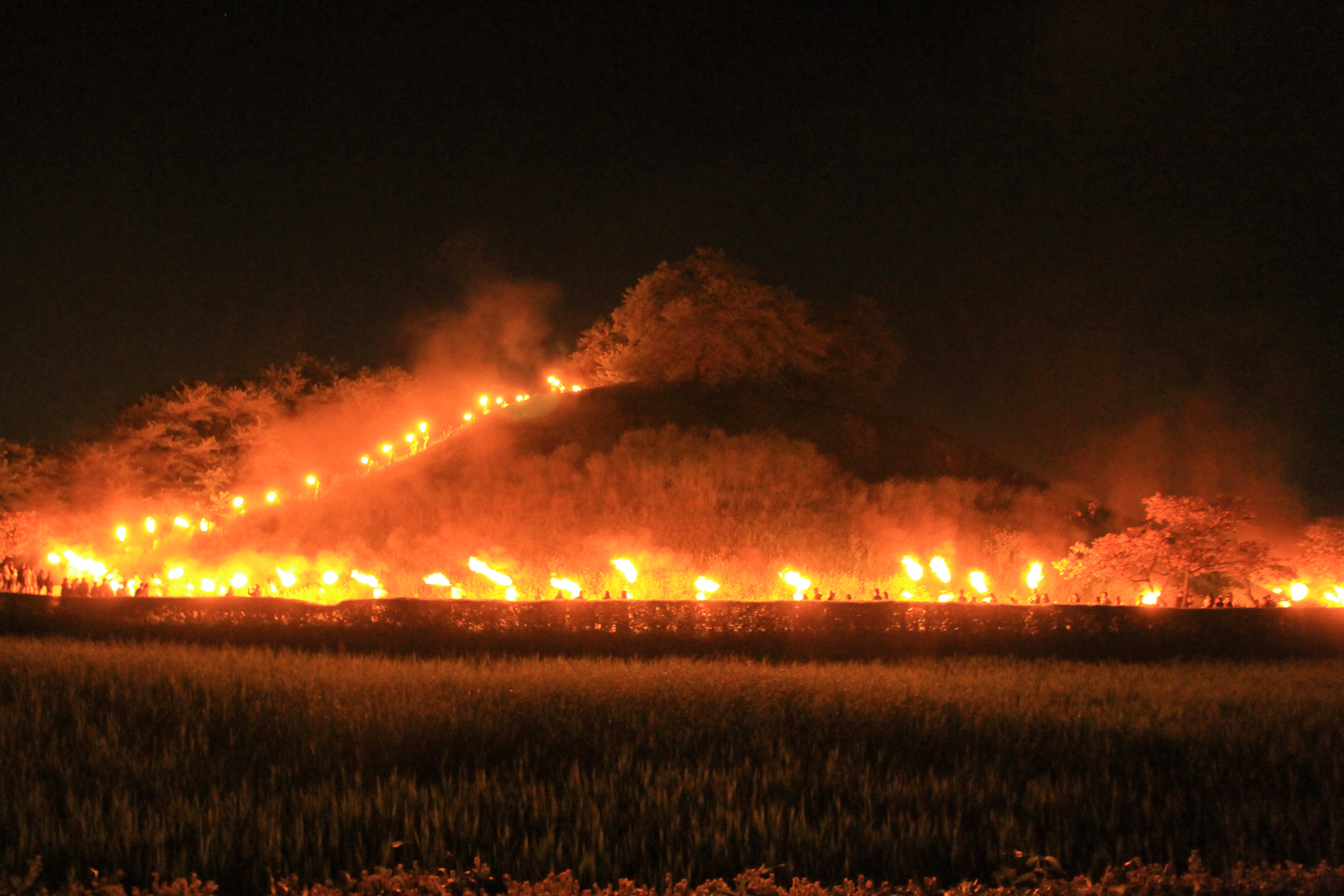
Sakitama Fire Festival

Sakitama Fire Festival in 2018

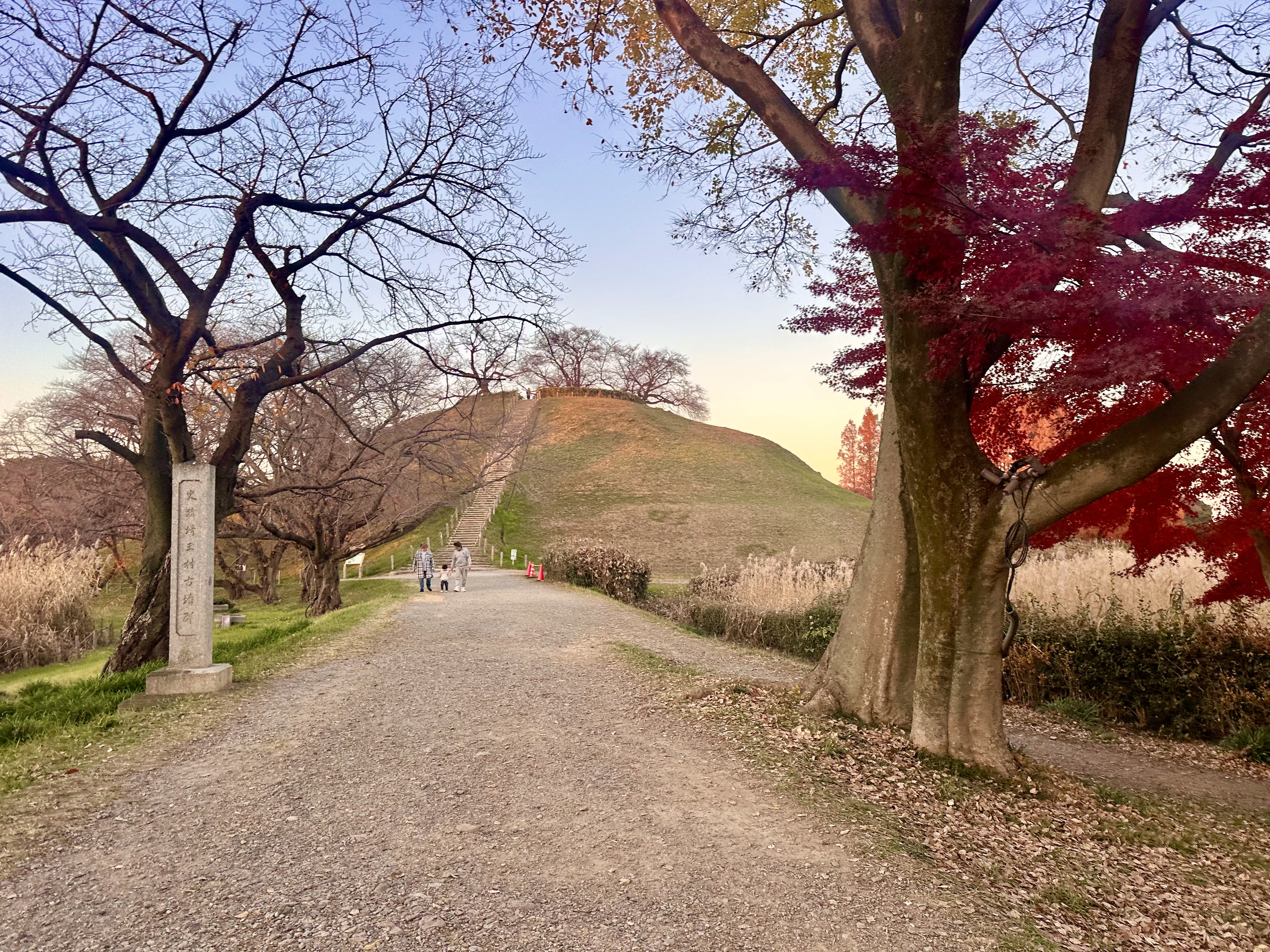
In Autumn, 2025

== See also ==
- List of Historic Sites of Japan (Saitama)
