= Nakanoyama Kofun =

- 中の山古墳 (Japanese)
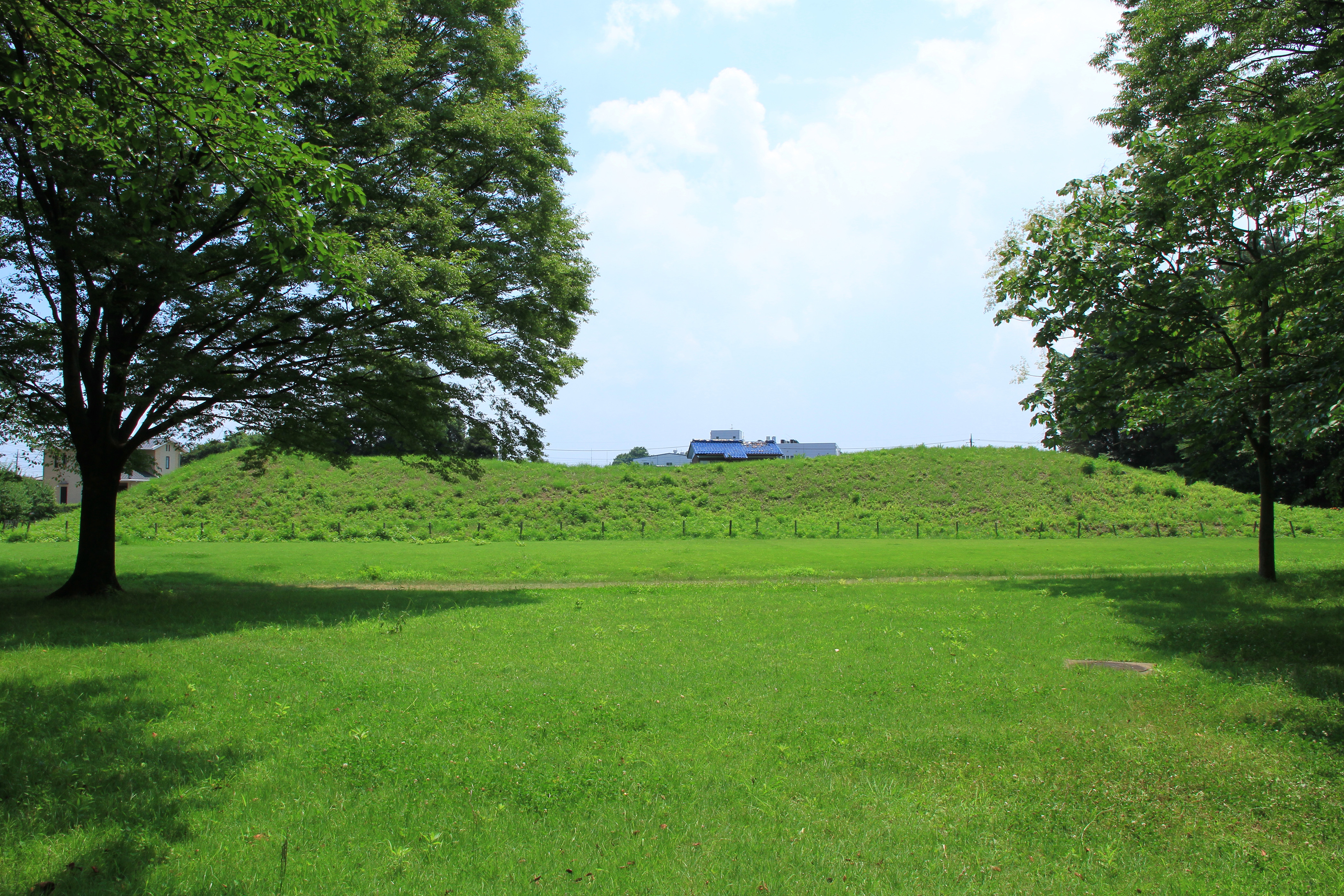
- Naka-no-yama Kofun

- Nakanoyama Kofun Nakanoyama Kofun (Japan)
- 36°7′19.9″N 139°28′41.7″E
- Type: Kofun
- Periods: Kofun period
- Location: Gyōda, Saitama, Japan
- Region: Kantō region

History
- Built: 6th-7th century AD

Site notes
- Public access: Yes

The Nakanoyama Kofun (中の山古墳) is a kofun burial mound located in the city of Gyōda, Saitama Prefecture, in the Kantō region of Japan. The tumulus was designated a National Historic Site in 1938 and re-designated as a Special National Historic Site of Japan in 2020 as part of the Sakitama Kofun Cluster.

== Overview ==
The Nakanoyama Kofun has a total length of 79 meters, and is the third smallest tumulus in the Saitama Kofun Cluster. It is a zenpō-kōen-fun (前方後円墳), which is shaped like a keyhole, having one square end and one circular end, when viewed from above. As with the other keyhole-shaped tumuli in this cluster, the Nakanoyama Kofun had a double moat which is presumed to be rectangular as with the other tumuli in this cluster, but this has yet to be confirmed. Archaeological excavation were performed in 1981, 1987, 1990, and 2010, indicating that it was made from the end of the 6th century to the beginning of the 7th century AD, making it the last of the keyhole-shaped tumuli to have been built in this cluster.

A grey Sue ware jar was found in an excavation of the moat, instead of the usual haniwa. This jar has a trumpet-shaped mouth and a hole in the bottom. Although analysis showed that it was made at a kiln in Yorii, Saitama about 30 kilometers away, no other examples have been found in the Kantō region, although similar jars have been found at the Asahi Tenjinyama Kofun in Hita, Oita and at the Fushiiwasato No. 2 Tumulus in Naju, South Jeolla Province, South Korea in what was once the kingdom of Baekje.

Overall length
79 meters
Posterior circular portion
42 meter diameter x 5.1 meter high
Anterior rectangular portion
44 meters wide x 5.4 meters high

== See also ==
- List of Historic Sites of Japan (Saitama)
