= Shichirō =

- Gender: Male

Origin
- Origin: Japanese
- Meaning: Different meanings depending on the kanji used

Shichirō, Shichiro or Shichirou (written: 七郎) is a masculine Japanese given name. Notable people with the name include:

- Shichirō Fukazawa (深沢 七郎) (1914–1987), Japanese writer and guitarist
- Kataoka Shichirō (片岡 七郎) (1854–1920), Imperial Japanese Navy admiral
- Shichirō Kihara (木原 七郎) (1884–1951), Japanese mayor
- Shichirō Murayama (村山 七郎) (1908–1995), Japanese linguist
