= Institute of Technologists =

Coordinates: 36°06′52″N 139°27′28″E

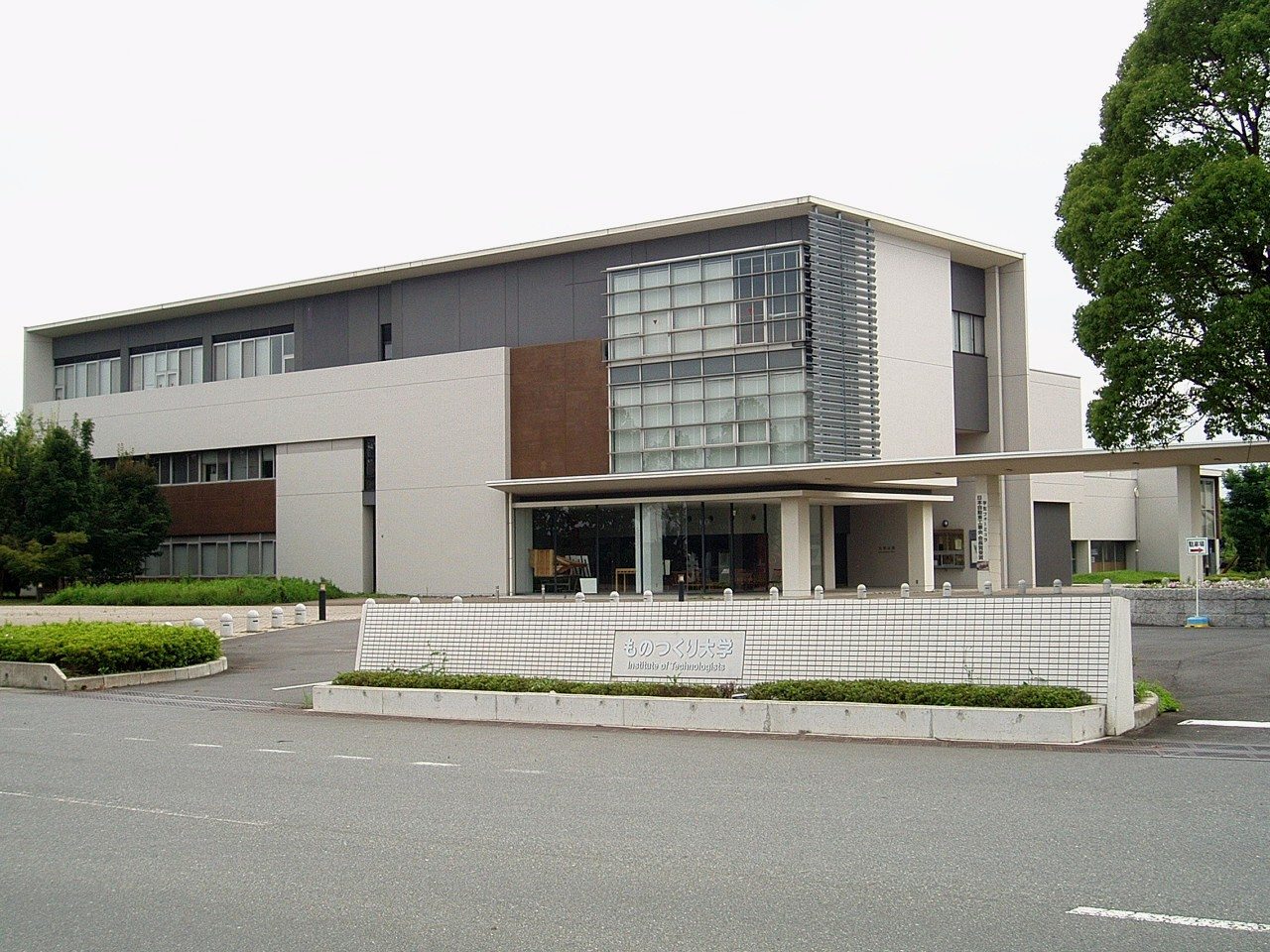
Main entrance

Institute of Technologists (ものつくり大学, Monotsukuri daigaku) is a private university in Gyōda, Saitama, Japan, established in 2001. The school name was proposed by philosopher Umehara Takeshi, who later became the president of the school.
