= Inariyama Sword =

Japanese iron burial-mound sword

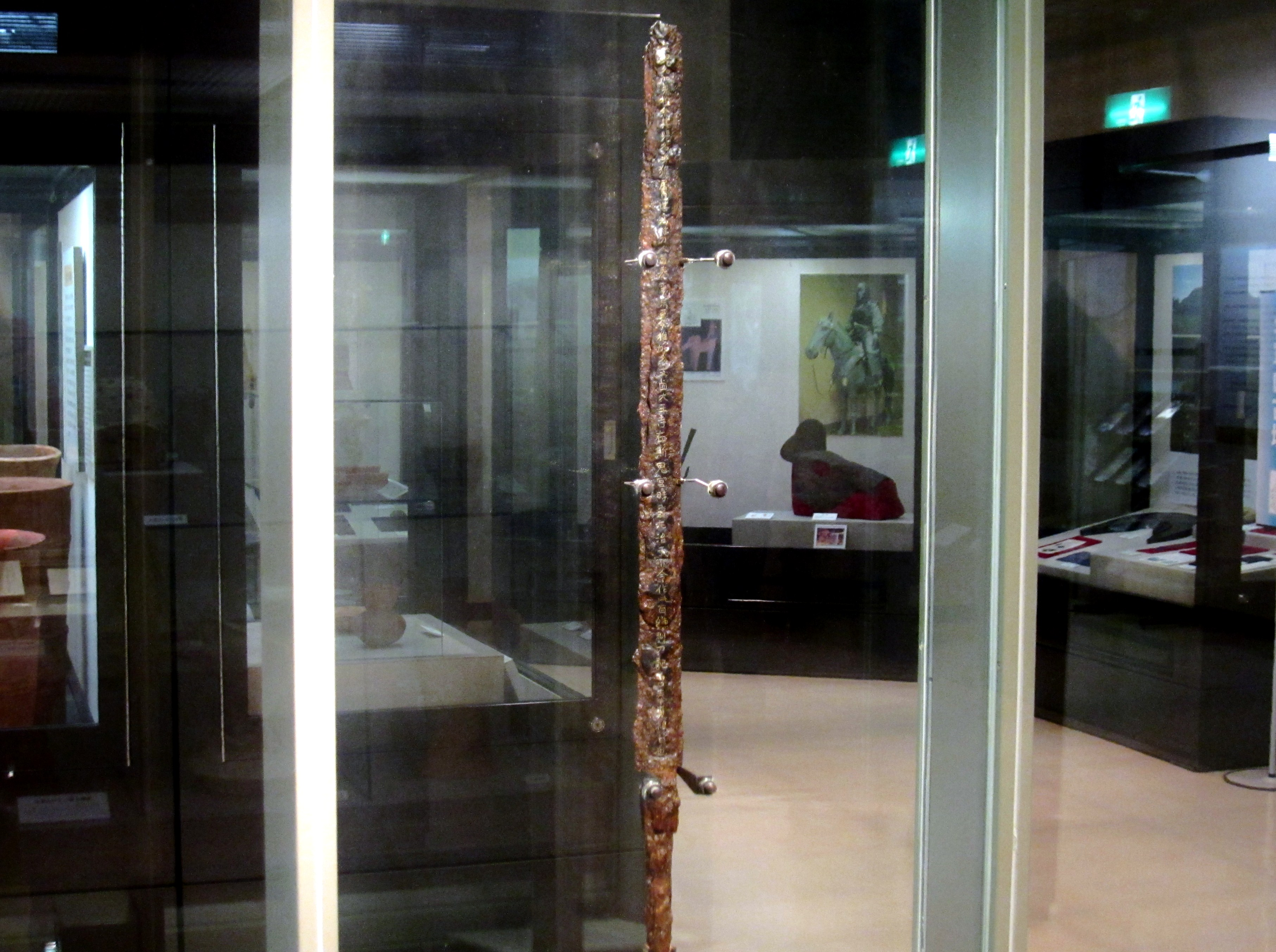
Inariyama Sword

The iron Inariyama burial-mound sword (稲荷山古墳出土鉄剣, inariyama kofun shutsudo tekken) or kinsakumei tekken (金錯銘鉄剣) was excavated in 1968 at the Inariyama Kofun, a megalithic tomb located in Saitama Prefecture. In 1978, X-ray analysis revealed a gold-inlaid inscription that comprises at least 115 Chinese characters. This sword was described as the discovery of the century for the study of ancient Japanese history. The sword is designated a national treasure of Japan and is on display in the Saitama Prefectural Museum of the Sakitama Ancient Burial Mounds.

== Creation ==
Japanese research suggests that the metal used in the sword was smelted from copper-bearing magnetite originating in the Jiangnan region of China, later brought to Japan, and then used to forge the sword.

== Inscription ==
The inscription is in classical Chinese, but includes several Japanese proper names written using Chinese characters as syllabograms. The original inscription and translation (by Murayama Shichirō and Roy Andrew Miller) is as follows.

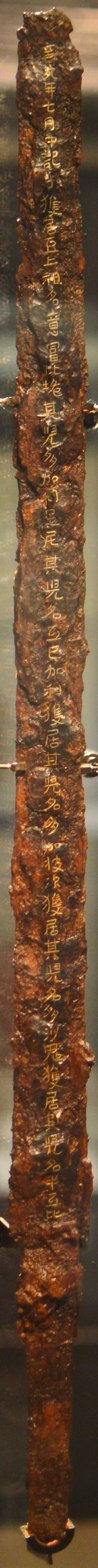
Front

Front

辛亥年七月中記	Inscribed in the seventh lunar month of a xīn-hài year:
乎獲居臣	Wo wakë omi:
上祖名意富比垝	[his] remote ancestor's name, Öpö piko;
其児多加利足尼	his child's name, Takari tsukunie;
其児名弖已加利獲居	his child's name, Teyö kari wakë;
其児名多加披次獲居	his child's name, Takapatsï wakë;
其児名多沙鬼獲居	his child's name, Tasakï wakë;
其児名半弖比	his child's name, Pandepi;

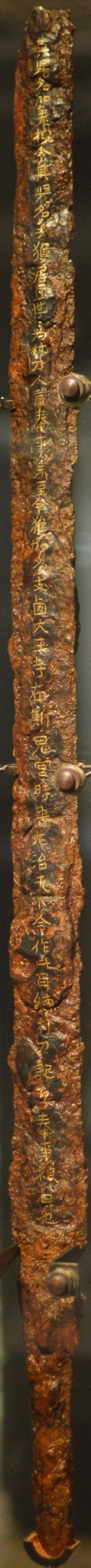
Reverse

Reverse

其児名加差披余	his child's name, Katsapaya;
其児名乎獲居臣	his child's name, Wo wakë omi.
世々爲杖刀人首	From generation unto generation, we have served as the sword-bearers' chiefs,
奉事來至今	down to the present time.
獲加多支鹵大王寺在斯鬼宮時	When the great king Waka Takiru's court was in the Sikï palace,
吾左治天下	I, assisting in the governance of the realm,
令作此百練利刀	caused to be fashioned this well-wrought efficacious sword,
記吾奉事根原也	recording my origins in service.

== Interpretation ==
The year is denoted as "xin-hai" (that is "Year of the Metal Pig") according to the Chinese sexagenary cycle, in which the name of the year is recycled every 60 years. It is generally regarded in Japan to correspond to 471 AD, but Seeley suggests that 531 is a more likely date. The person buried in the tomb, named Wowake, was an influential warrior in the region. King Waka Takiru in the transcription is thought to be the same person as Ōhatsuse-wakatakeru-no-mikoto as mentioned in the Nihon Shoki, an alias of Emperor Yūryaku. The name Waka Takiru is also apparently mentioned on another inscribed sword, the Eta Funayama Sword.

The remote ancestor mentioned in the engraving, Öpö piko, is thought to refer to Prince Ōhiko (大彦命), the eldest son of the legendary emperor Emperor Kōgen.

== Notes ==
=== Works cited ===
- Murayama, Shichirō; Miller, Roy Andrew (1979). "The Inariyama Tumulus Sword Inscription". Journal of Japanese Studies. 5 (2): 405–438. doi:10.2307/132104. JSTOR 132104.
- Seeley, Christopher (1991). A History of Writing in Japan. Brill Academic Publishers. pp. 19–23. ISBN 90-04-09081-9.
