= Teppōyama Kofun =

- 鉄砲山古墳 (Japanese)
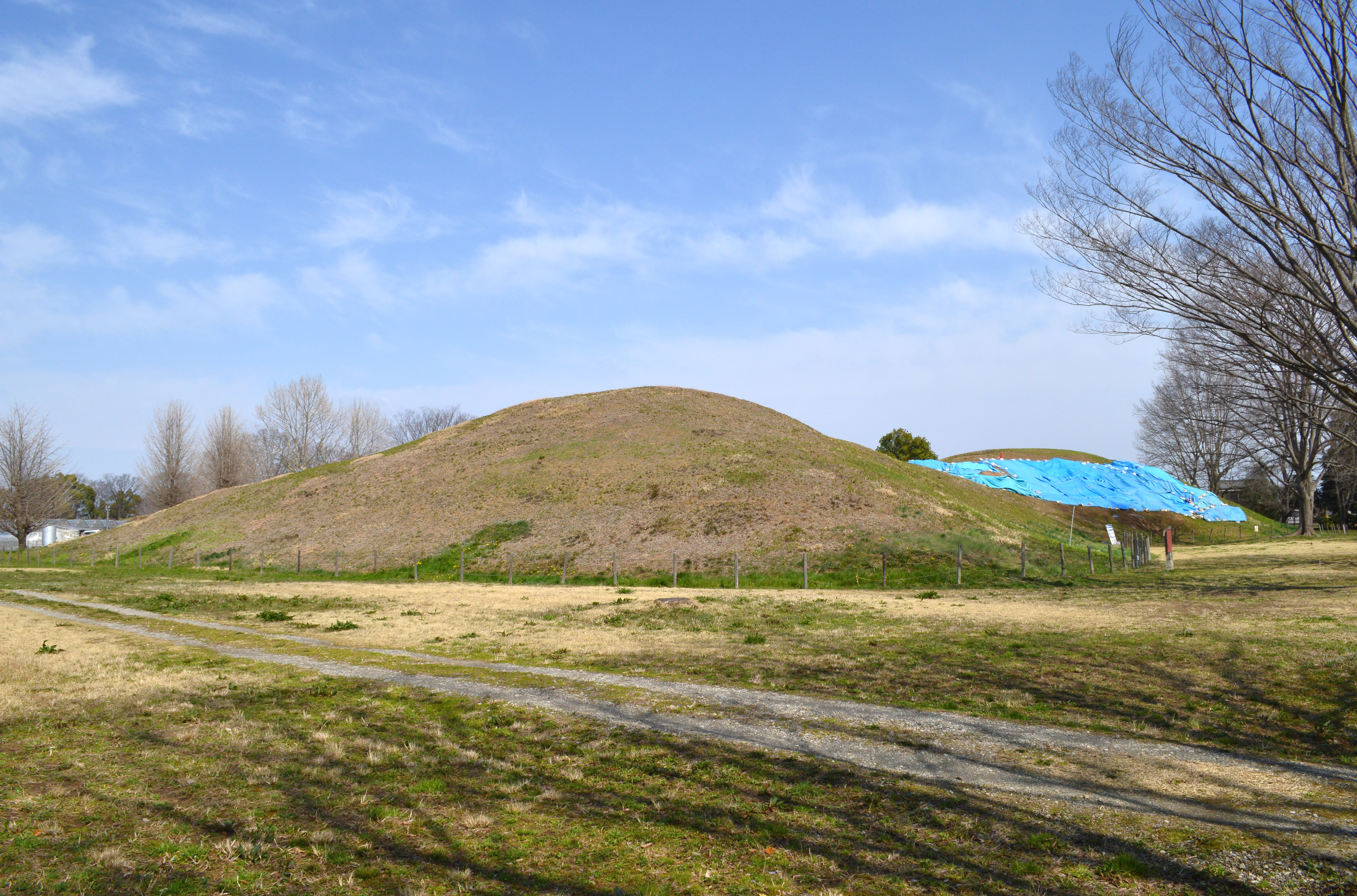
- Teppōyama Kofun

- Teppōyama Kofun Teppōyama Kofun (Japan)
- 36°7′25.73″N 139°28′41.56″E
- Type: Kofun
- Periods: Kofun period
- Location: Gyōda, Saitama, Japan
- Region: Kantō region

History
- Built: 6th century AD

Site notes
- Public access: Yes

The Teppōyama Kofun (鉄砲山古墳) is a kofun burial mound located in the city of Gyōda, Saitama Prefecture, in the Kantō region of Japan. The tumulus was designated a National Historic Site in 1938 and re-designated as a Special National Historic Site of Japan in 2020 as part of the Sakitama Kofun Cluster.

== Overview ==
The Teppōyama Kofun has a total length (including moat) of 163 meters, and is thus the third largest tumulus in the Saitama Kofun Cluster. It is a zenpō-kōen-fun (前方後円墳), which is shaped like a keyhole, having one square end and one circular end, when viewed from above. It has the same proportions as the Gyōda Futagoyama Kofun, but shrunk by 80%. Archaeological excavations have been conducted in 1967, 1983, 2008 and 2010 to 2011. Artifacts uncovered include cylindrical and "morning glory-shaped" haniwa, Haji ware, and Sue ware pottery, from which the tumulus is estimated to have been built in the latter half of the 6th century AD.

The kofun is highly unusual in that it has a triple moat, which is a very rare feature; however, traces of the outermost moat have survived only on the western side of the tumulus, and it is not certain if it once completed encircled the mound. Similar triple-moated kofun include The Mitsuke Kofun in Kurume, Fukuoka, Tsukioka Kofun in Ukiha, Fukuoka and the Otsumi Gongenzuka Kofun in Sammu, Chiba.

Another unusual feature is a protrusion extending from the western side of the tumulus, near the joint between the rectangular and circular portions. This is a feature which also appears in the Inariyama Kofun, Gyōda Futagoyama Kofun, and Shogunyama Kofun in the Sakitama Kofun Group, but is rarely found in other locations. Called a "Tsukuridashi", it was apparently a platform used for rituals.

From the results of ground-penetrating radar surveys and excavation on the posterior circular portion of the tumulus, it is known that there is a horizontal-type stone burial chamber that is orientated to the south. However, no excavation of the burial chamber itself has been conducted, and it is unknown whether or not it has been robbed in antiquity. The entrance to the burial chamber was thickly covered with clay. A Sue ware pot with a perforated bottom has been excavated from the vestibule.

The name "Teppōyama" comes from the fact that tumulus was used as a gunnery training center of Oshi Domain during the Edo period. The training ground was located near the northern constriction, and the mound was modified to form the backstop behind targets used in rifle practice with an embankment constructed to shelter the person near the targets who confirmed whether or not the shooter's aim was correct. A total of 154 bullets in18 varieties have also been found at the site.

Overall length
109 meters
Posterior circular portion
55 meter diameter x 9.0 meter high
Anterior rectangular portion
69 meters wide x 10.1 meters high

== See also ==
- List of Historic Sites of Japan (Saitama)
