= Gyōda Futagoyama Kofun =

Burial Mound in Japan

- 二子山古墳 (Japanese)
- Gyōda Futagoyama Kofun

- Gyōda Futagoyama Kofun Gyōda Futagoyama Kofun (Japan)
- 36°7′34.54″N 139°28′44.61″E
- Type: Kofun
- Periods: Kofun period
- Location: Gyōda, Saitama, Japan
- Region: Kantō region

History
- Built: 6th century AD

Site notes
- Public access: Yes

The Gyōda Futagoyama Kofun (二子山古墳) is a kofun burial mound located in the city of Gyōda, Saitama Prefecture, in the Kantō region of Japan. The tumulus was designated a National Historic Site in 1938 and re-designated as a Special National Historic Site of Japan in 2020 as part of the Sakitama Kofun Cluster.

== Overview ==
The Gyōda Futagoyama Kofun has a total length (including moat) of 132.2 meters, and is thus the largest tumulus in the Saitama Kofun Cluster (and in Musashi Province). It is a zenpō-kōen-fun (前方後円墳), which is shaped like a keyhole, having one square end and one circular end, when viewed from above. As with most other tumuli at this site, it has a double rectangular moat. The current inner moat is filled with water, but it was originally a dry moat. Another unusual feature is a protrusion extending from the western side of the tumulus, near the joint between the rectangular and circular portions. Called a "Tsukuridashi", this is a feature which also appears in the Inariyama Kofun, Teppōyama Kofun and Shogunyama Kofun in the Sakitama Kofun Group, but is rarely found in other locations.

The internal structure of the tumulus and its burial chamber are unknown, as it has not been excavated; however, from a ground penetrating radar curved in 2017, it appears that there is a horizontal-type stone chamber in the east side of the posterior circular portion. Portions of the tumulus were endanger of collapse due to erosion from water in the inner moat, and repair work was conducted from 2013 to 2018. Many cylindrical haniwa over one meter in size have been excavated from the moat, along with some Sue ware and Haji ware pottery, from which the tumulus is estimated to have been built in the first half of the 6th century AD.

Overall length
132.2 meters
Posterior circular portion
67.0 meter diameter x 11.7 meter high
Anterior rectangular portion
83.2 meters wide x 13.7 meters high

== See also ==
- List of Historic Sites of Japan (Saitama)
