= Shichirō Murayama =

Japanese linguist

Shichirō Murayama (村山 七郎, Murayama Shichirō; 25 December 1908 in Ibaraki Prefecture – 13 May 1995) was a Japanese linguist who started his career lecturing at Juntendo University, and went on to become full professor at Kyoto Sangyo University. One of the world’s foremost authorities on the Altaic languages, he later made important contributions to the mixed-language theory of the origins of Japanese. Denis Sinor regarded him, together with Shirō Hattori, Samuel E. Martin, and Osada Natsuki as one of the four scholars who have done the most to throw light on the origins of the Japanese language.

== Career ==
Murayama spent much of the Second World War from 1942 to 1945 in Germany, completing post-graduate studies at Berlin University on Comparative linguistics and Altai languages under the supervision of Nikolaus Poppe with particular attention to written materials in the Mongolian language.

== Publications ==
- with Ōbayashi Taryō, Nihongo no kigen, Kōbundō, Tokyo 1973
- Nihongo no kenkyū-hōhō, Kōbundō, Tokyo 1974
- Nihongo no gogen, Kōbundō, Tokyo 1974
- Nihongo no genkai, Kōbundō, Tokyo 1975
- Nihongo keitō no tankyū, Taishūkan Shoten, Tokyo 1978
- Nihongo no tanjō, Chikuma Shobō, Tokyo 1979
- with Kokubu Naoichi,Genshi nihongo to minzoku bunka, San'ichi Shobō,1979
- Ryūkyūgo no himitsu, Kōbundō, Tokyo 1981
- Nihongo no kigen to gogen, San'ichi Shobō, Tokyo 1981
- Nihongo Tamirugo kigensetsu hihan, San'ichi Shobō, Tokyo 1982
- Ainugo no kigen, San'ichi Shobō, Tokyo 1992

== See also ==
- Classification of the Japanese language
- Altaic languages
