= Saitama Prefectural Museum of the Sakitama Ancient Burial Mounds =

Archaeological museum in Japan

Coordinates: 36.124928°N 139.475590°E

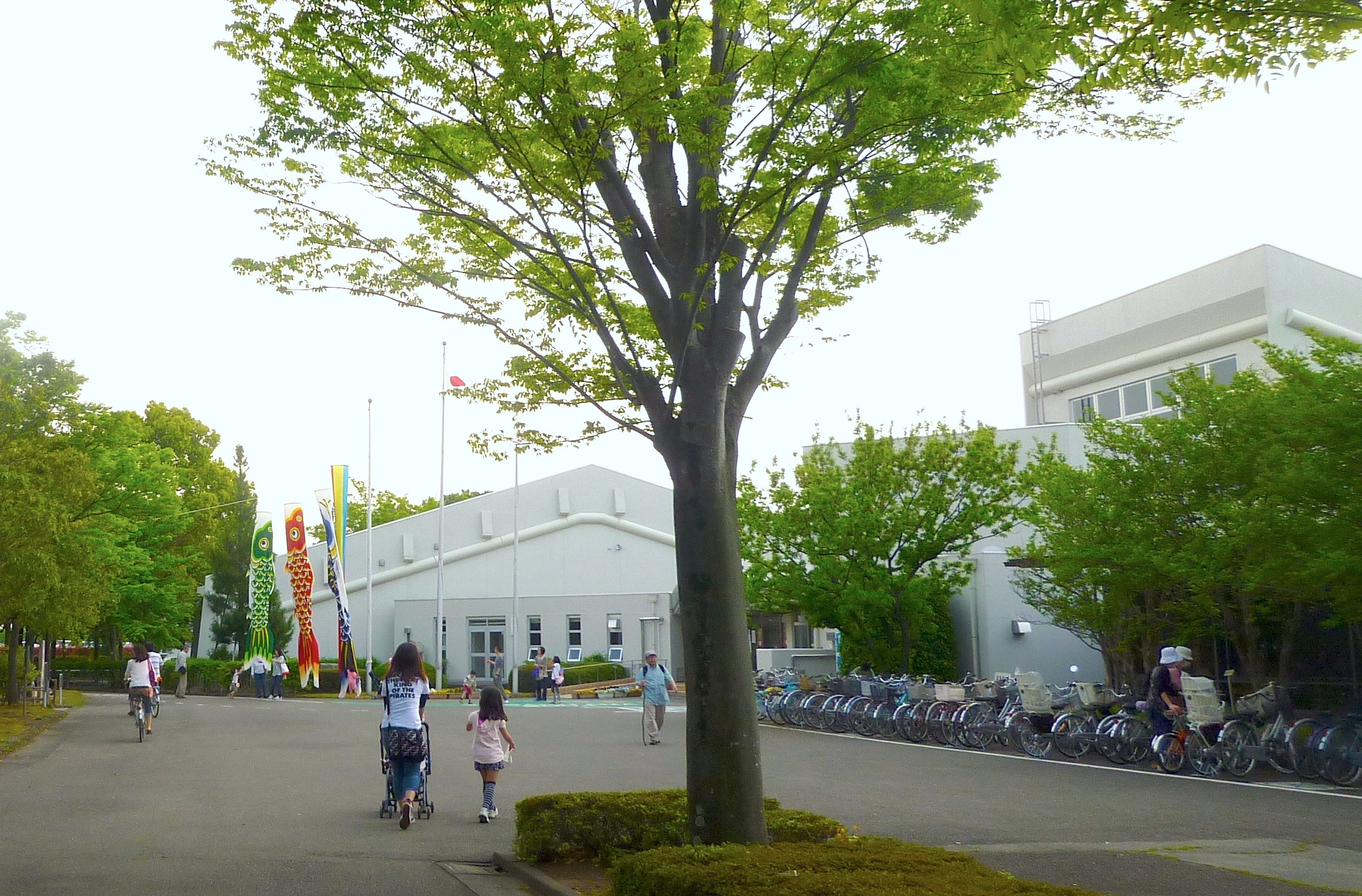
The museum in 2011

The Saitama Prefectural Museum of the Sakitama Ancient Burial Mounds (埼玉県立さきたま史跡の博物館, Saitama Kenritsu Sakitama Shiseki no Hakubutsukan) is a museum in Gyōda, Saitama, Japan. The building is inside of Sakitama Kofun Park. It is one of Japan's many museums which are supported by a prefecture.

The museum was originally established as Sakitama Museum (さきたま資料館) in 1969 as part of the construction of Sakitama Fudoki Hills (さきたま風土記の丘), an archeological preserve encompassing the Sakitama Kofun Cluster. In 2006, Saitama Prefecture renamed the museum as Museum of the Sakitama Ancient Burial Mounds and made its goals the research, collection, preservation of the site's archeological data as well as educating the site's cultural and historical value to its visitors.

Nearly 100,000 visitors come to the museum every year to learn about Sakitama Kofun Cluster and its artifacts, including a national treasure, Inariyama Sword. The museum consists of two buildings, Sakitama Shiseki Hall and Shōgunyama Kofun Exhibit Hall, which opened in 1997 and allows visitors to walk inside of the reconstructed stone chamber of the Shōgunyama Kofun.

== See also ==
- List of National Treasures of Japan (archaeological materials)
