= Gyōda =

Gyōda 行田市
- City
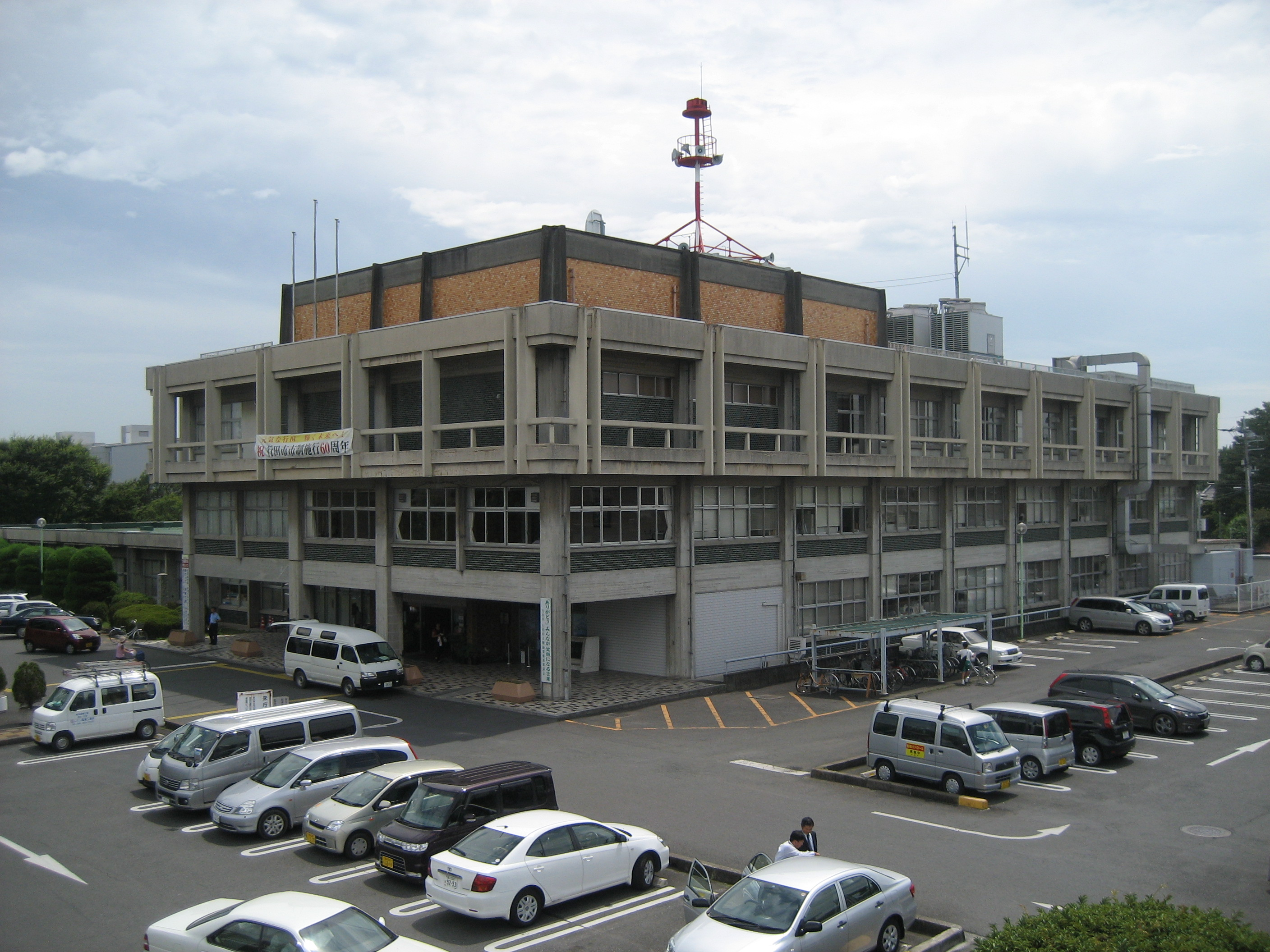
- Gyōda City Hall

- Flag Seal

- Location of Gyōda in Saitama Prefecture

- Location within Japan
- Coordinates: 36°8′20″N 139°27′20.3″E
- Country: Japan
- Region: Kantō
- Prefecture: Saitama
- First official recorded: early 5th century (official)
- Oshi town settled: April 1, 1889
- Gyōda city settled: May 3, 1949

Government
  - Mayor: Kuniko Kōda (since May 2023)

Area
  - Total: 67.49 km^{2} (26.06 sq mi)

Population (March 2025)
  - Total: 77,618
  - Density: 1,150/km^{2} (2,979/sq mi)
- Time zone: UTC+9 (Japan Standard Time)
  - Tree: Ginkgo biloba
  - Flower: Chrysanthemum, Nelumbo nucifera
- Phone number: 048-556-1111
- Address: 2–5 Honmaru, Gyoda-shi, Saitama-ken 361-8601
- Website: Official website

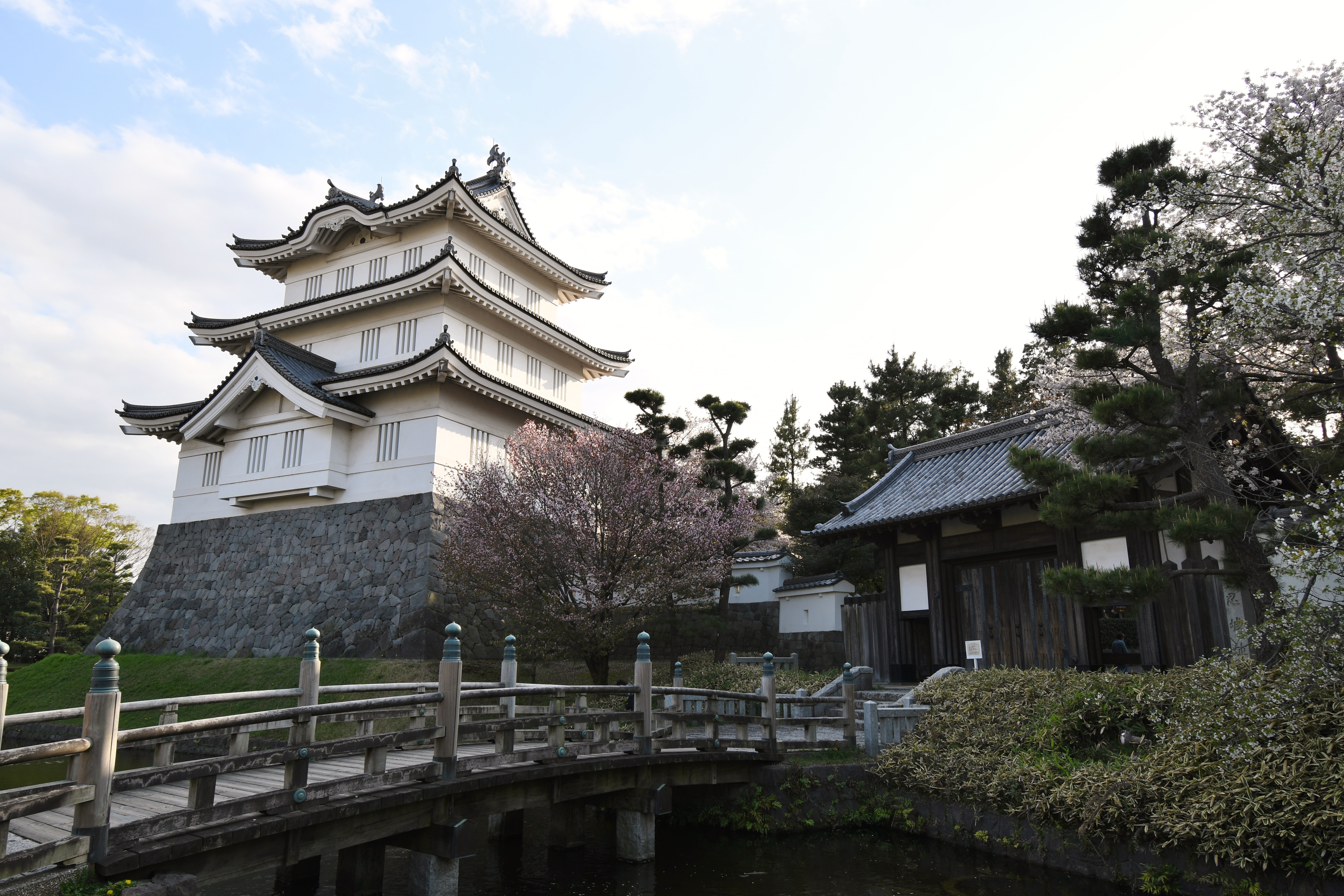
Oshi Castle

Gyōda (行田市, Gyōda-shi) is a city located in Saitama Prefecture, Japan. As of 1 November 2020, the city had an estimated population of 80,236 in 40,482 households and a population density of 1200 persons per km^{2}. The total area of the city is 67.49 square kilometres (26.06 sq mi).

== Geography ==
Gyōda is located in north-central Saitama Prefecture, with the Tone River separating it from Gunma Prefecture. The entire city is located on the alluvial plain of the Tone River and the Arakawa River. The altitude is 19.7 meters above sea level (Gyoda City Hall), and the city as a whole is around 20 meters above sea level. The highest point is 36 meters above sea level (in Saitama Kofun Park).

=== Surrounding municipalities ===
- Gunma Prefecture
  - Chiyoda
  - Meiwa
- Saitama Prefecture
  - Hanyū
  - Kazo
  - Kōnosu
  - Kumagaya

=== Climate ===
Gyōda has a humid subtropical climate (Köppen Cfa) characterized by warm summers and cool winters with light to no snowfall. The average annual temperature in Gyōda is 14.5 °C. The average annual rainfall is 1300 mm with September as the wettest month. The temperatures are highest on average in August, at around 26.7 °C, and lowest in January, at around 3.5 °C.

== Demographics ==
Per Japanese census data, the population of Gyōda peaked around the year 2000 and has declined since.

Historical population
Year	Pop.	±%
1960	58,164	—
1970	63,582	+9.3%
1980	76,960	+21.0%
1990	87,014	+13.1%
2000	90,530	+4.0%
2010	85,786	−5.2%
2020	78,617	−8.4%

== History ==
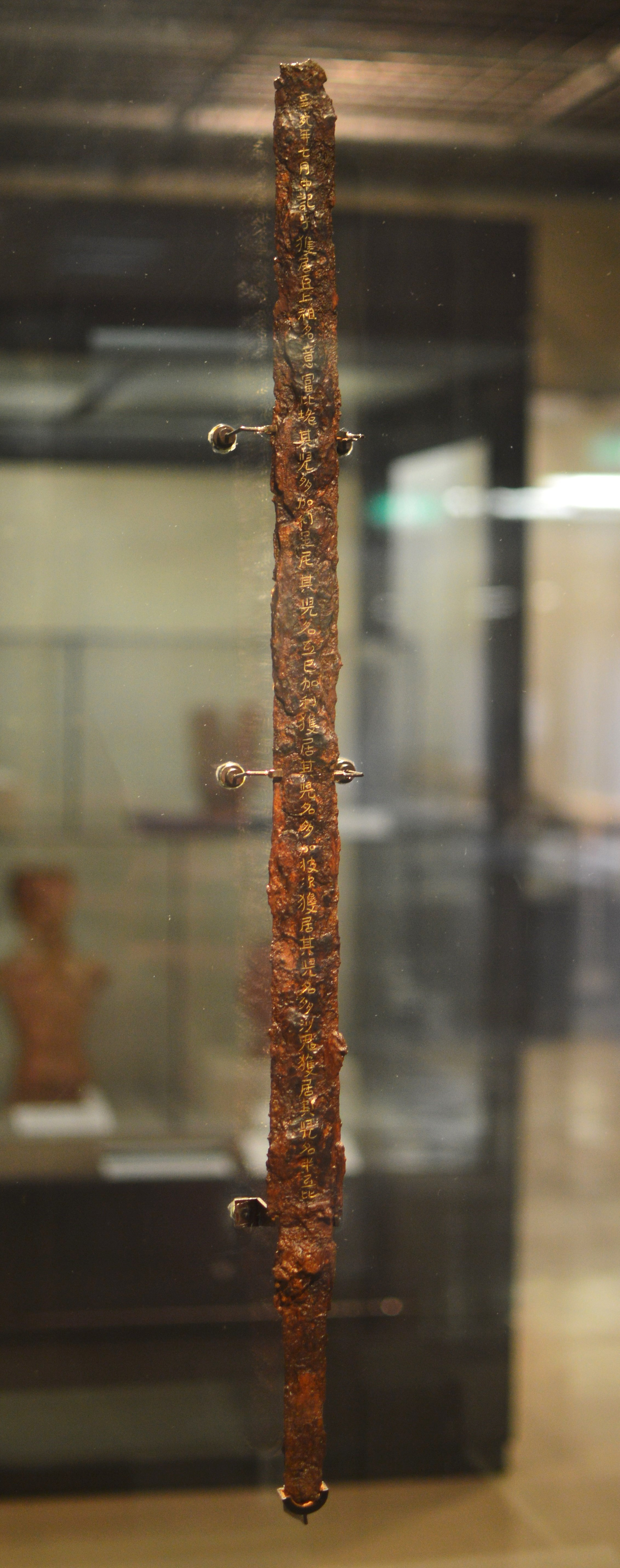
An Iron Age sword excauated from Inariyama burial mound, where discovered by local education board in 1978

Gyōda contains many Kofun period burial mounds and has been inhabited since prehistoric times. "Saitama" is a local place name within Gyōda, and is recorded in Nara period documents. During the Sengoku period, Oshi Castle famously withstood a siege by Ishida Mitsunari in 1590. During the Edo period Tokugawa shogunate, the castle was the center of Oshi Domain, ruled by a branch of the Matsudaira clan until 1871, during which time the castle town prospered from its location on the Nakasendō highway.

The town of Gyōda was created within Kitasaitama District, Saitama with the establishment of the modern municipalities system on April 1, 1889. On April 1, 1937, Gyōda annexed the neighboring villages of Nagano, Hoshikawa and Mochida. It was elevated to city status on April 23, 1949. From 1954 to 1955, the city expanded by annexing the neighboring villages of Araki, Suka, Kitakawahara, Saitama, Hoshimiya, and Ōi. On January 1, 2006, the village of Minamikawara (from Kitasaitama District) was merged into Gyōda.

== Government ==
Gyōda has a mayor-council form of government with a directly elected mayor and a unicameral city council of 20 members. Gyōda contributes one member to the Saitama Prefectural Assembly. In terms of national politics, the city is part of Saitama 12th district of the lower house of the Diet of Japan.

== Economy ==
Gyōda has a mixed economy of agriculture and light manufacturing, especially for automobile components. SHOWA Corporation, a global manufacturer of automotive, motorcycle and outboard suspension systems, is headquartered in the city.

== Education ==
- Institute of Technologists
- Gyōda has 16 public elementary schools and eight public junior high schools operated by the city government, and one public high school operated by the Saitama Prefectural Board of Education. The prefecture also operates one special education school for the handicapped.

== Transportation ==
=== Railway ===
JR East – Takasaki Line

- Gyōda

Chichibu Railway – Chichibu Main Line

- Bushū-Araki – Gyōdashi – Higashi-Gyōda – Mochida

=== Highway ===
- National Route 17
- National Route 125

== Sister cities ==
- Kuwana, Mie, Japan
- Shirakawa, Fukushima, Japan

== Local attractions ==
=== Important historical sites ===
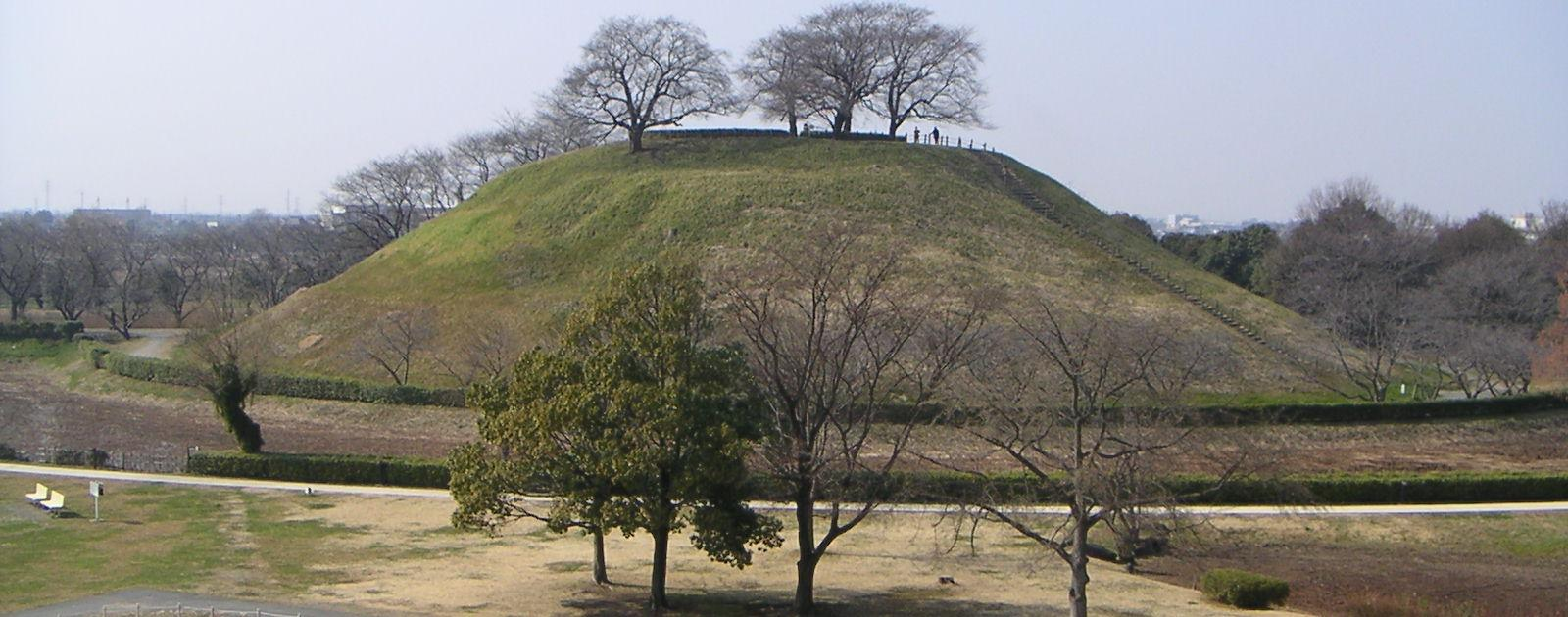
Muruhakayama Kofun

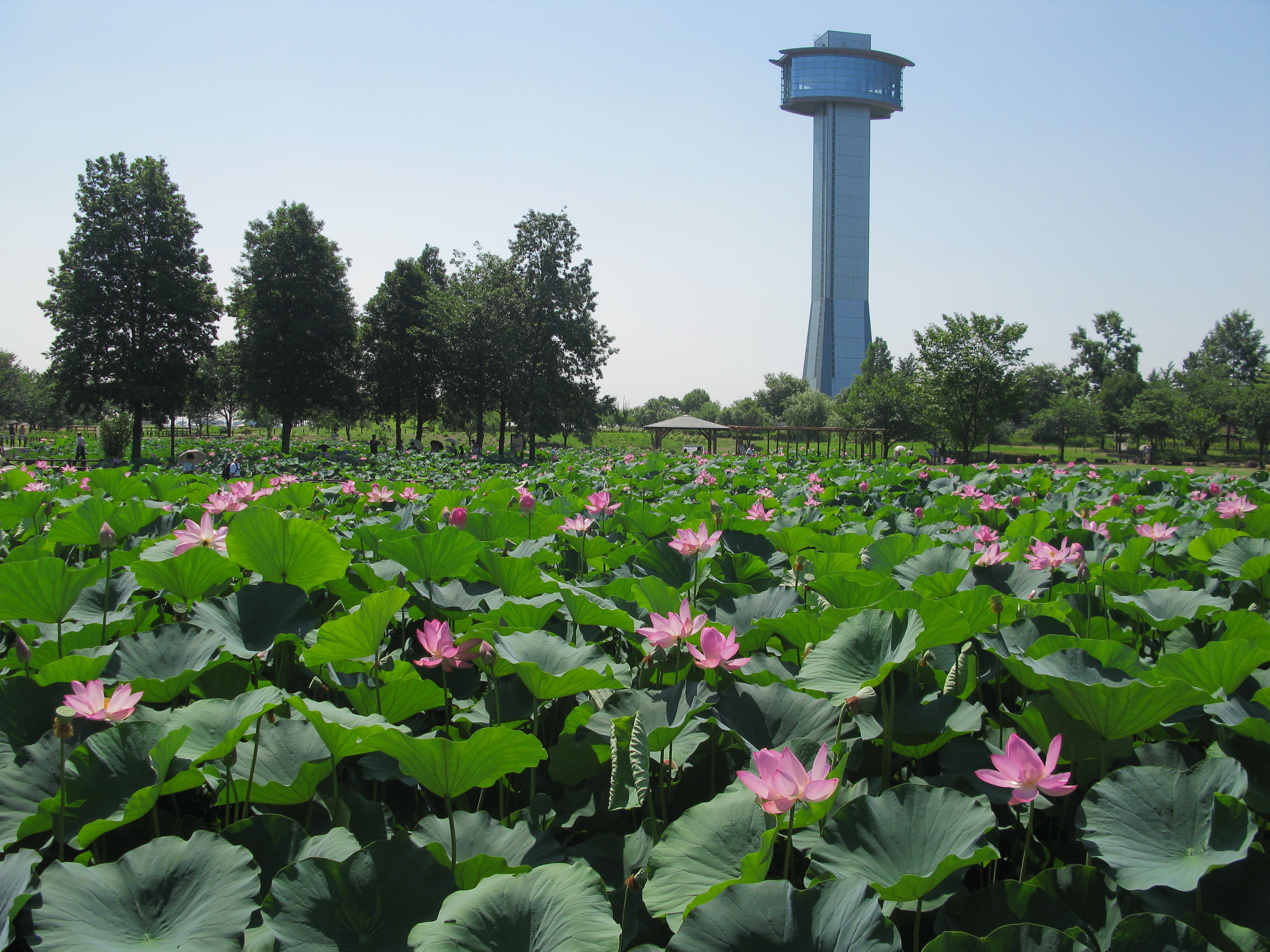
Ancient Lotus Park

- Ancient Lotus Park (古代蓮の里, Kodai hasu no sato) has lotuses that were grow from seeds estimated to date back 1,400 to 3,000 years which had been found by chance during excavation for the building of a waste disposal facility. After a few thousand years of dormancy, they awoke and germinated. The large pink blossoms bloom only in the morning for about a month from mid-July after the close of the rainy season.
- Oshi Castle (忍城御三階櫓, Oshi-jo Gosankai Yagura) is a 1988 reconstruction of the third yagura tower of Oshi Castle. The daimyō Narita Akiyasu built Oshi Castle near the end of the 15th century using the natural levee of the surrounding marshlands and river. It was considered impregnable. When it was attacked by the 20,000 man army of Ishida Mitsunari in 1590, it did not fall even when it was flooded by water drawn in from the nearby river, leading to the rumor that it floated on water. The existing turret was reconstructed in 1988. The castle grounds are also the home of Oshi Tōshō-gū shrine.
- Saitama Kofun Park (さきたま古墳公園) is a 300,000 square metres (3,229,173 sq ft) historic park dotted with large ancient tombs, including the Maruhakayama Kofun, one of the largest round burial mounds in Japan. At Shogunyama Kofun, a key-hole shaped 91 metres (299 ft) long burial mound that is square at the head and rounded at the foot, there is a display room of its interior where the stone cave hut and excavated articles have been restored to their original conditions in the 5th to 7th centuries.

== Food culture ==
Zeri Furai is a local speciality consisting of fried bean curd, carrots, onion, and potato. There are many shops which sell it around town, especially during the warmer seasons.

== Traditional handicrafts ==
Gyōda is a center for traditional tabi socks, worn with kimono. Gyoda still makes half of the tabi made in Japan.
