= Bushū-Araki Station =

Railway station in Gyōda, Saitama Prefecture, Japan

CR04 Bushū-Araki Station 武州荒木駅
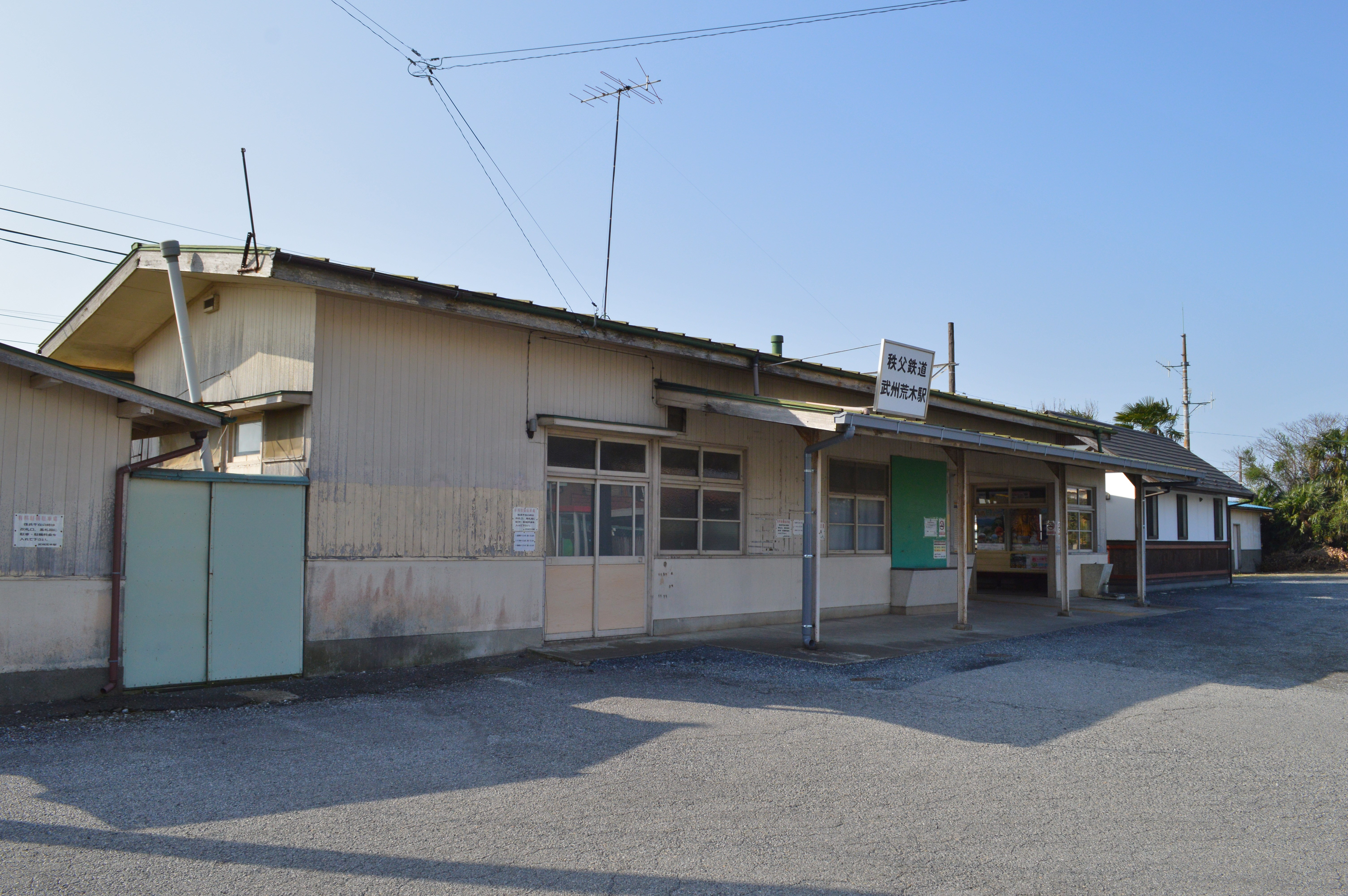
- Bushū-Araki Station in March 2016

General information
- Location: 1411 Araki, Gyōda-shi, Saitama-ken 361–0011; Japan
- Coordinates: 36°9′45.13″N 139°29′17.42″E
- Operator: Chichibu Railway
- Line: ■ Chichibu Main Line
- Distance: 4.8 km from Hanyū
- Platforms: 1 island platform

Other information
- Status: Staffed
- Website: Official website

History
- Opened: 1 April 1921

Passengers
- FY2018: 371 daily

Services
| Preceding station | Chichibu Railway | Following station |
|---|---|---|
| Higashi-Gyōda CR05 towards Mitsumineguchi | Chichibu Main Line Local | Shingō CR03 towards Hanyū |
Location
- Location within Saitama Prefecture Location within Japan

Bushū-Araki Station (武州荒木駅, Bushū-Araki-eki) is a passenger railway station located in the city of Gyōda, Saitama, Japan, operated by the private railway operator Chichibu Railway

== Lines ==
Bushū-Araki Station is served by the Chichibu Main Line from Hanyū to Mitsumineguchi, and is located 4.8 km from Hanyū.

== Station layout ==
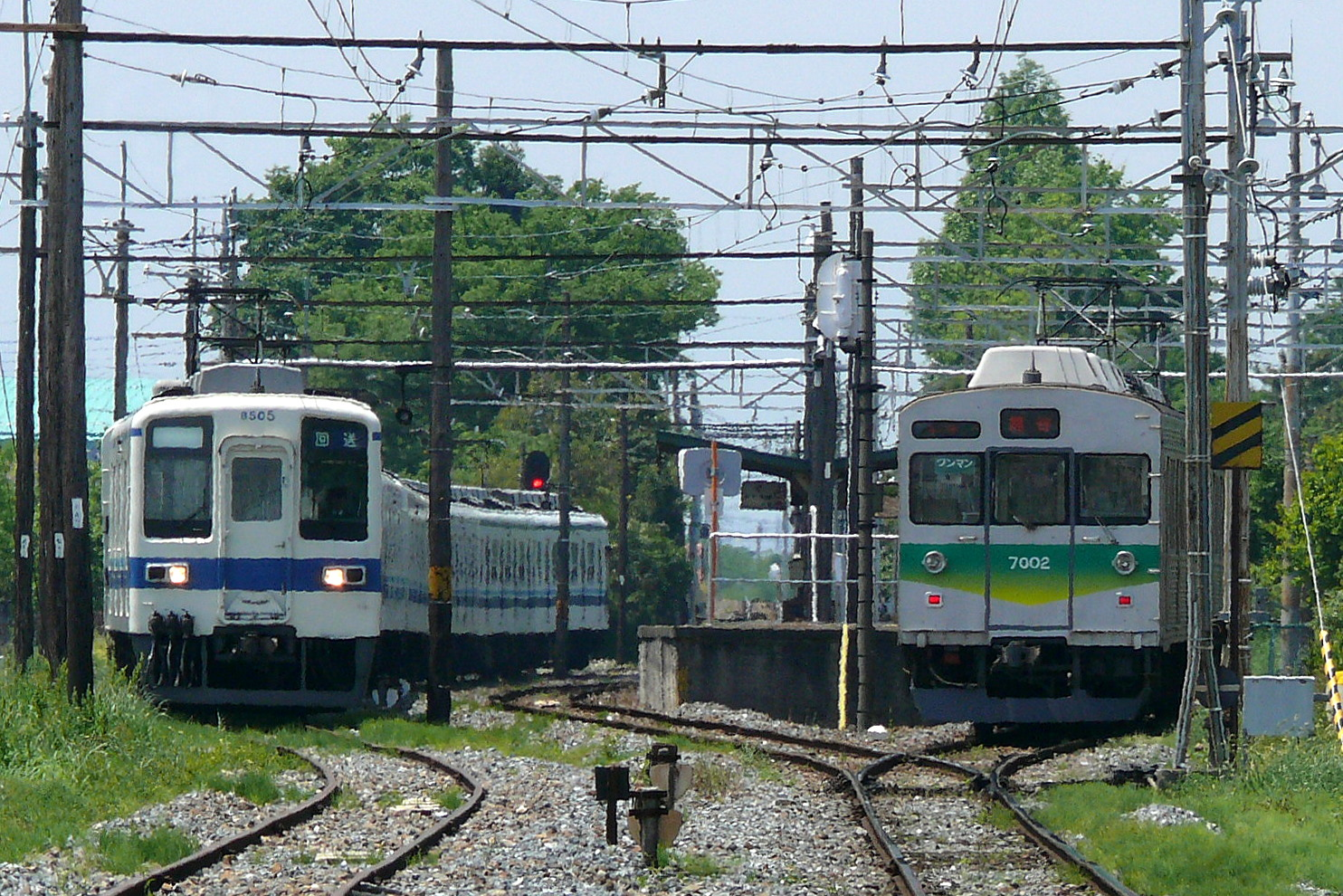
View of the station with a Tobu 8000 series EMU being transferred on the left in May 2010

The station consists of a single island platform serving two tracks.

=== Platforms ===
| 1 | ■ Chichibu Main Line | for Gyōdashi, Kumagaya, Yorii, Chichibu, and Mitsumineguchi |
| 2 | ■ Chichibu Main Line | for Hanyū |

== History ==
Bushū-Araki Station opened on 1 April 1921.

== Passenger statistics ==
In fiscal 2018, the station was used by an average of 371 passengers daily.

== Surrounding area ==
- National Route 125
- Gyōda Araki Elementary School

== See also ==
- List of railway stations in Japan
