= Hanyu =

Hanyu may refer to:

- Hànyǔ (漢語), the Chinese language or language of the Han Chinese
  - Hanyu pinyin, the official romanization system for Standard Chinese in mainland China and to some extent in Taiwan and Singapore
- Hanyū, Saitama, a city in Saitama, Japan

== People ==
- Han Yu (韓愈, 768–824), ancient Chinese essayist
- Kazue Hanyu (羽生 和永, born 1950), Japanese gymnast
- Naotake Hanyu (羽生 直剛, born 1979), Japanese footballer
- Yuzuru Hanyu (羽生 結弦, born 1994), Japanese figure skater

== Fictional characters ==
- Mayuri Hanyu, a supporting character in 2.5 Dimensional Seduction
