= Higashi-Gyōda Station =

Railway station in Gyōda, Saitama Prefecture, Japan

CR05 Higashi-Gyōda Station 東行田駅
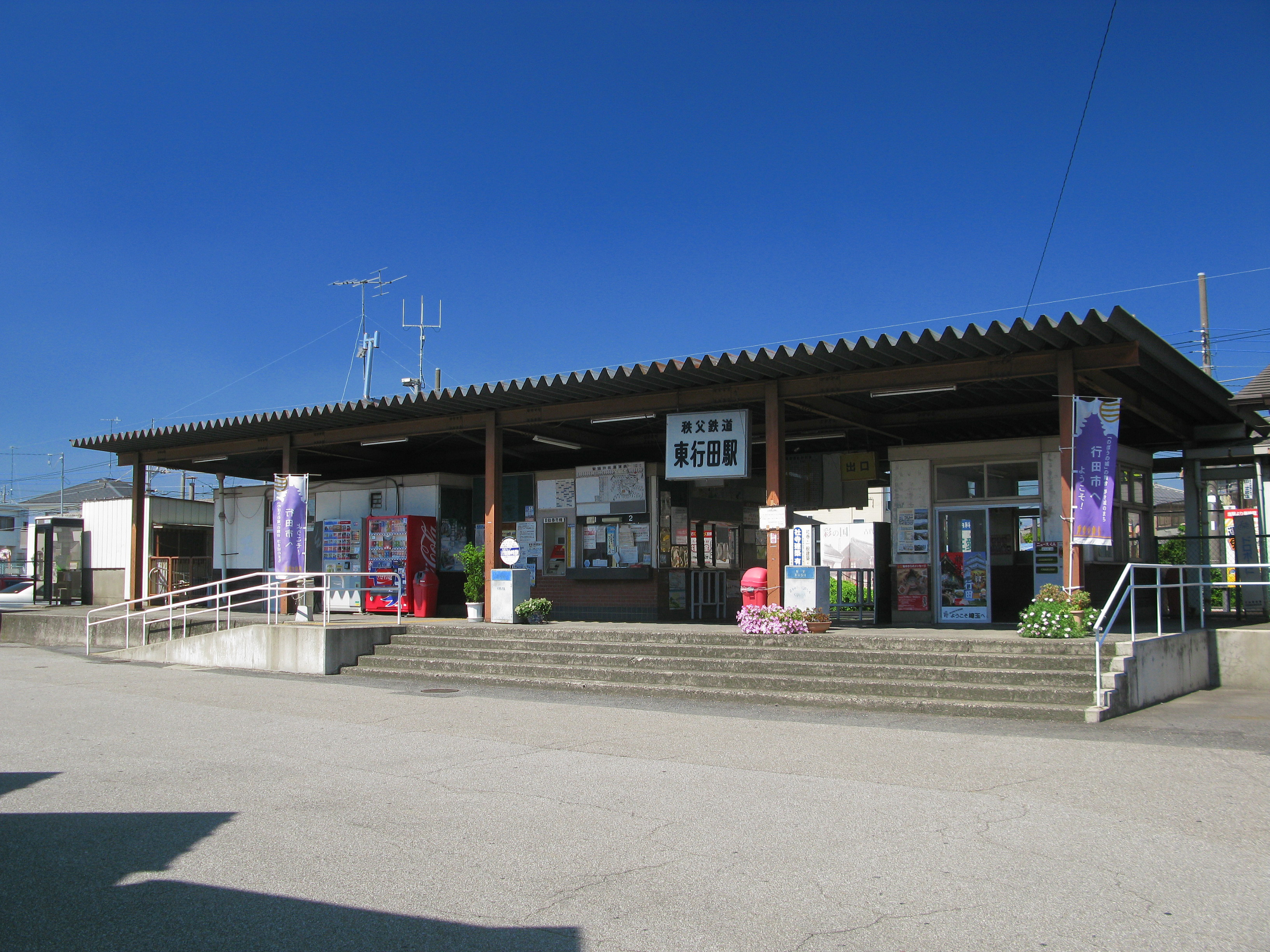
- Higashi-Gyōda Station, August 2012

General information
- Location: 2-23-12 Sakura-chō, Gyōda-shi, Saitama-ken 361-0022; Japan
- Coordinates: 36°08′50″N 139°28′06″E
- Operator: Chichibu Railway
- Line: ■ Chichibu Main Line
- Distance: 7.3 km from Hanyū
- Platforms: 1 island platform
- Connections: Bus stop

Other information
- Website: Official website

History
- Opened: 20 November 1932

Passengers
- FY2018: 2388 daily

Services
Preceding station	Chichibu Railway	Following station
Gyōdashi CR06 towards Mitsumineguchi	Chichibu Main Line Local	Bushū-Araki CR04 towards Hanyū
Location
- Location within Saitama Prefecture Location within Japan

Higashi-Gyōda Station (東行田駅, Higashi-Gyōda-eki) is a passenger railway station located in the city of Gyōda, Saitama, Japan, operated by the private railway operator Chichibu Railway.

== Lines ==
Higashi-Gyōda Station is served by the Chichibu Main Line from Hanyū to Mitsumineguchi, and is located 7.3 km from Hanyū.

== Station layout ==
This station consists of a single side platform, serving a single bi-directional track.

== History ==
Higashi-Gyōda Station opened on 20 November 1932.

== Passenger statistics ==
In fiscal 2018, the station was used by an average of 2388 passengers daily.

== Surrounding area ==
- National Route 125
- Saitama Prefectural Shinshukan Senior High School
