= Shingō Station =

Railway station in Hanyū, Saitama Prefecture, Japan

CR03 Shingō Station 新郷駅
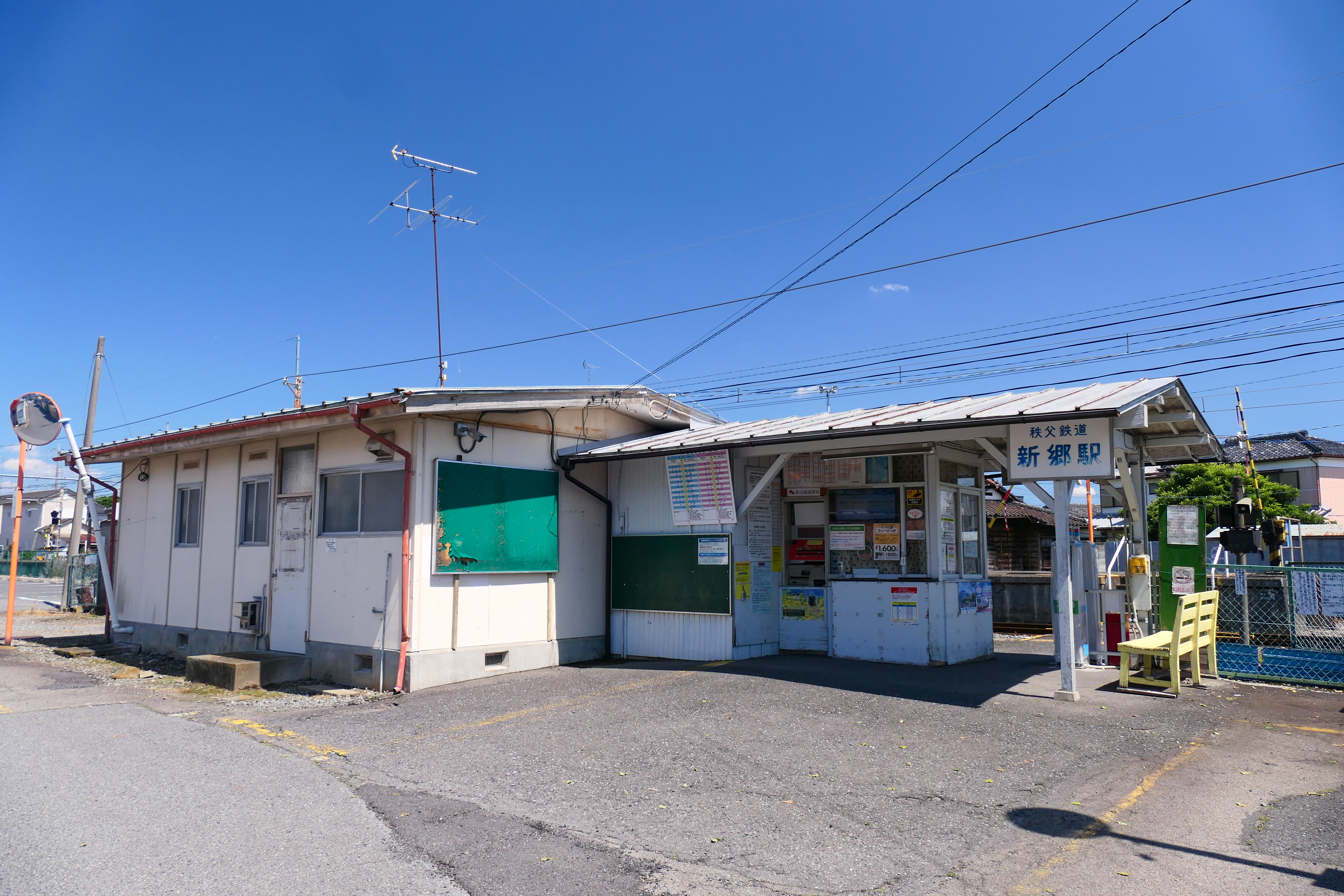
- Shingō Station in June 2022

General information
- Location: 1950-1 Kami-Shingō, Hanyū-shi, Saitama-ken 348-0041; Japan
- Coordinates: 36.1712°N 139.5101°E
- Operator: Chichibu Railway
- Line: ■ Chichibu Main Line
- Distance: 2.6 km from Hanyū
- Platforms: 1 island platform
- Tracks: 2
- Connections: Bus stop

Other information
- Website: Official website

History
- Opened: 1 April 1921

Passengers
- FY2018: 301 daily

Services
Preceding station	Chichibu Railway	Following station
Bushū-Araki CR04 towards Mitsumineguchi	Chichibu Main Line Local	Nishi-Hanyū CR02 towards Hanyū
Location
- Location within Saitama Prefecture Location within Japan

Shingō Station (新郷駅, Shingō-eki) is a passenger railway station located in the city of Hanyū, Saitama, Japan, operated by the private railway operator Chichibu Railway.

== Lines ==
Shingō Station is served by the Chichibu Main Line from Hanyū to Mitsumineguchi, and is located 2.6 km from Hanyū.

== Station layout ==
The station consists of a single island platform serving two tracks.

=== Platforms ===
1	■ Chichibu Main Line	for Gyōdashi, Kumagaya, Yorii, Chichibu, and Mitsumineguchi
2	■ Chichibu Main Line	for Hanyū

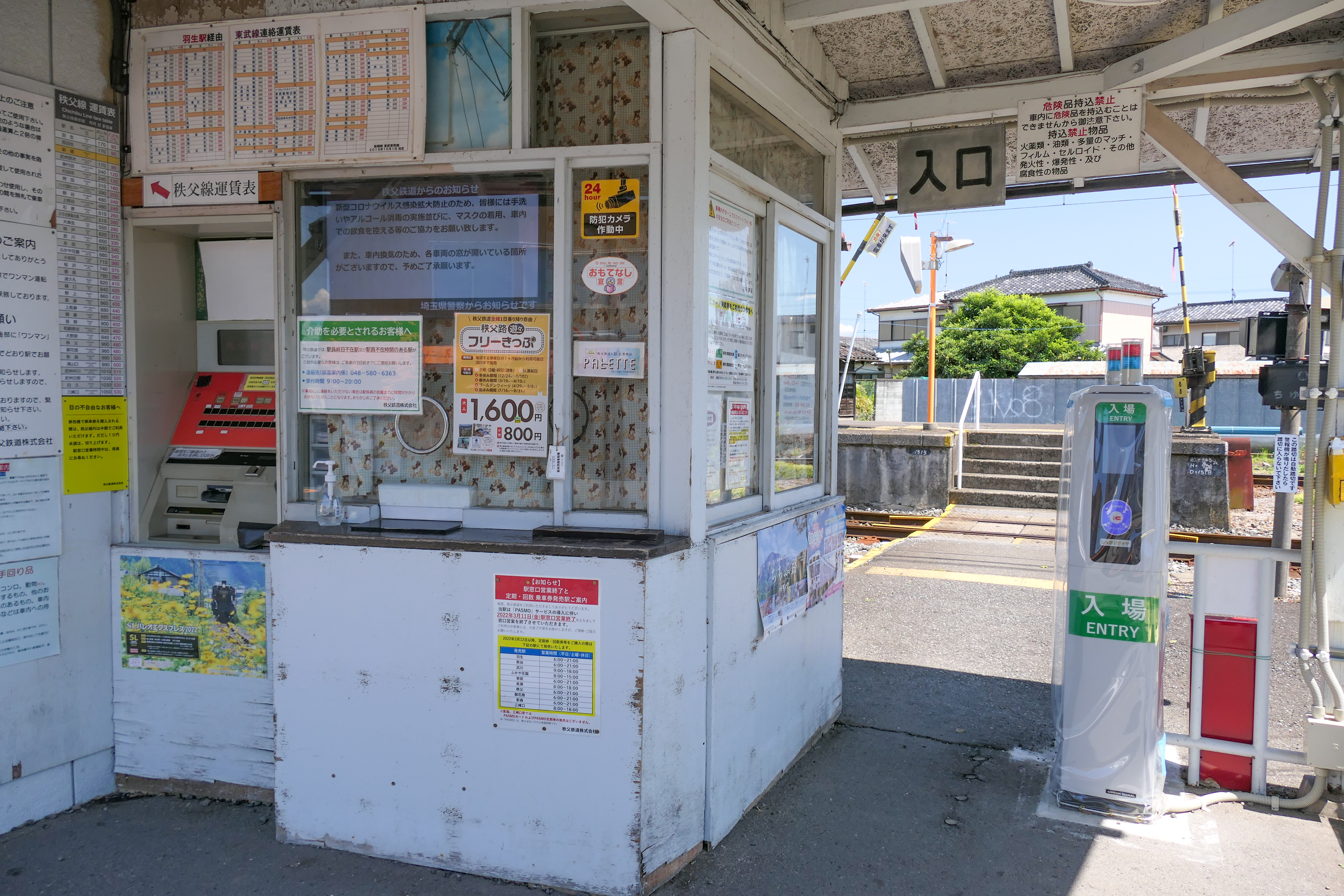
Ticket barriers in June 2022

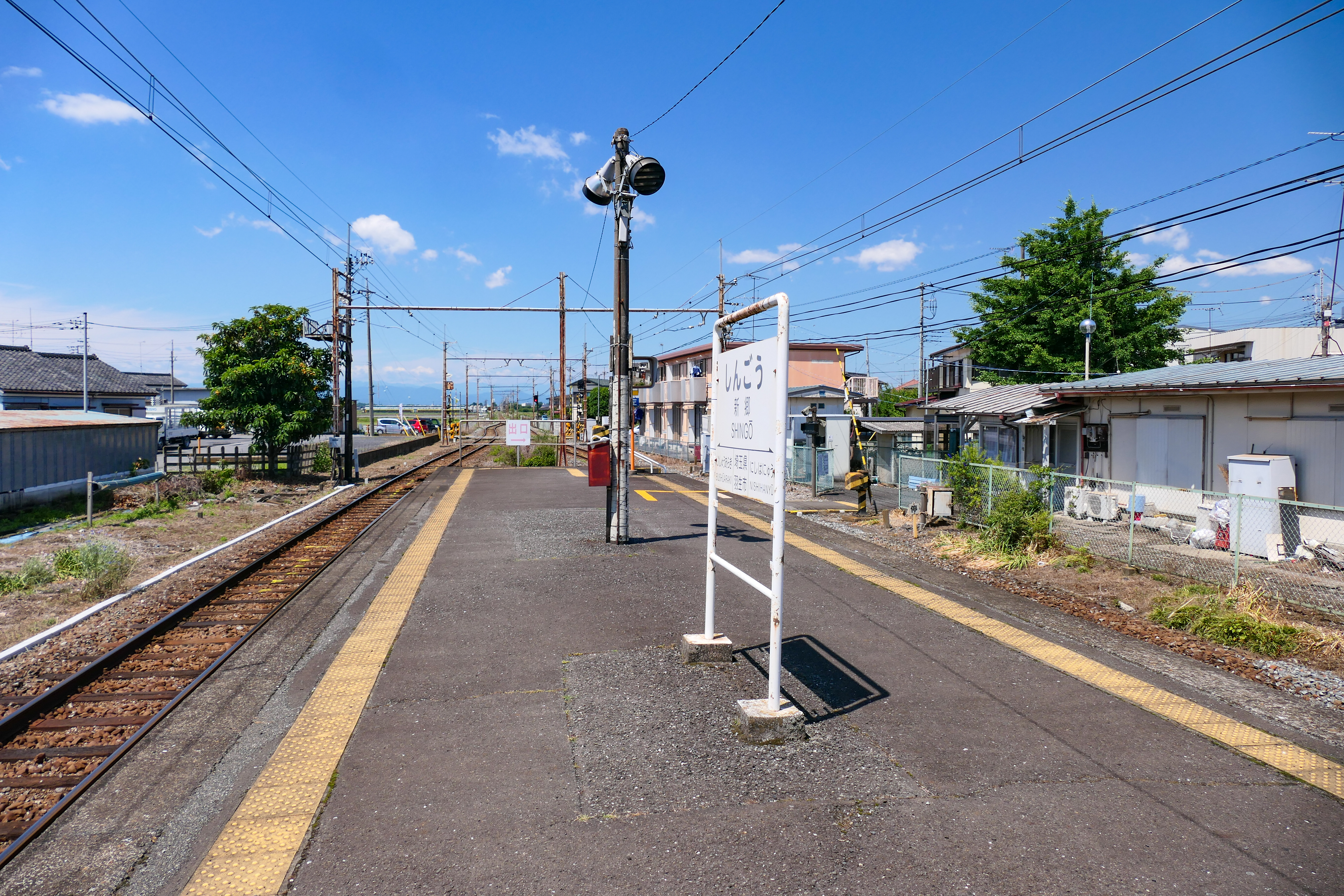
Platforms in June 2022

== History ==
Shingō Station opened on 1 April 1921.

== Passenger statistics ==
In fiscal 2018, the station was used by an average of 301 passengers daily.

== Surrounding area ==
- Hanyū Shingō No. 1 Elementary School

== See also ==
- List of railway stations in Japan
