= Socio Distribution Center Station =

Railway station in Kumagaya, Saitama Prefecture, Japan

CR08 Socio Distribution Center Station ソシオ流通センター駅
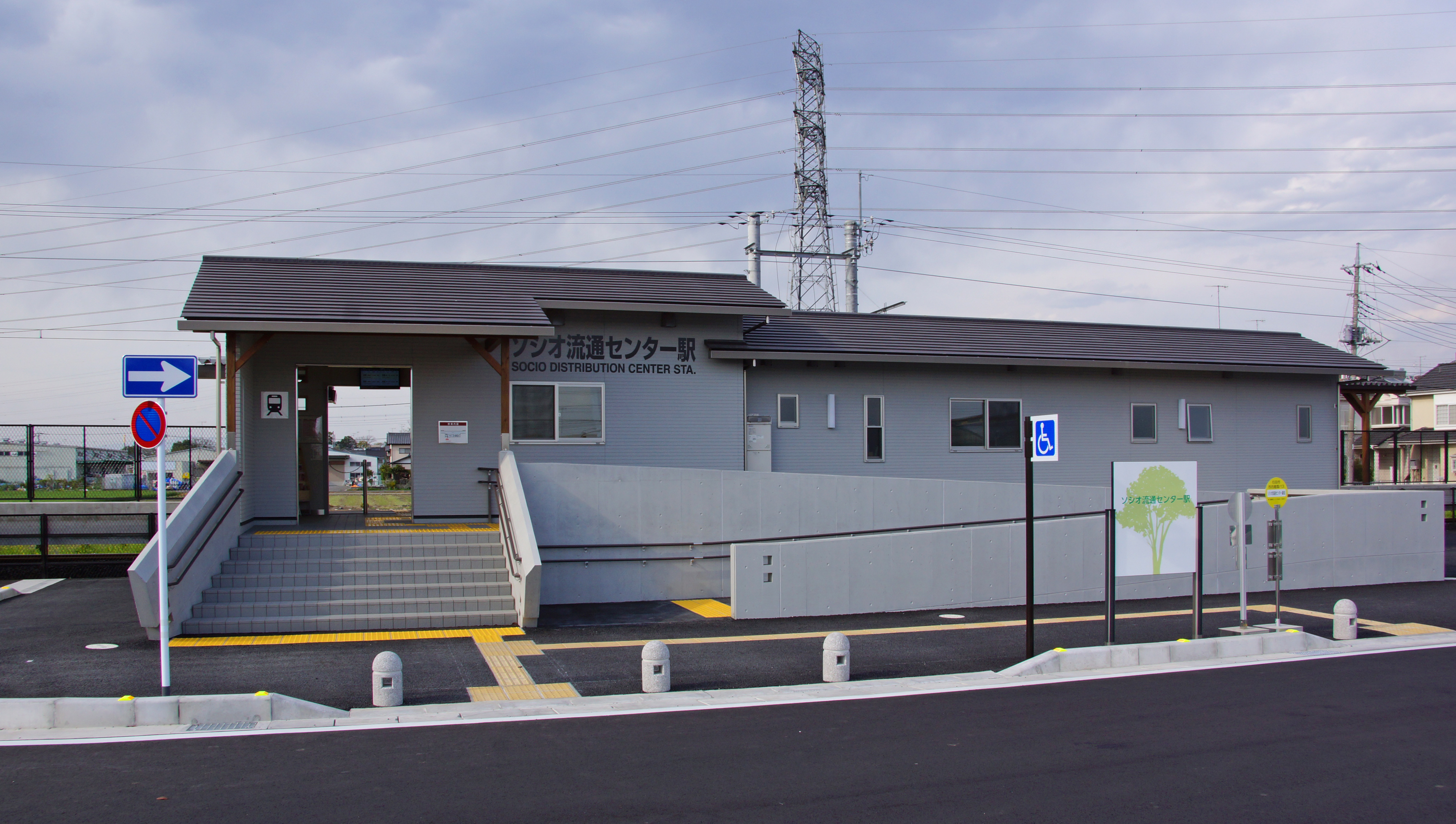
- Socio Distribution Center Station in April 2017

General information
- Location: 102-1 Tode, Kumagaya-shi, Saitama-ken; Japan
- Coordinates: 36°8′11.4″N 139°25′27.6″E
- Operator: Chichibu Railway
- Line: ■ Chichibu Main Line
- Distance: 11.6 km from Hanyū
- Platforms: 1 side platform
- Tracks: 1

Construction
- Parking: Yes
- Cycle facilities: Yes
- Accessible: Access ramps; Universal access toilet

Other information
- Website: Official website

History
- Opened: 1 April 2017

Services
Preceding station	Chichibu Railway	Following station
Kumagaya CR09 towards Mitsumineguchi	Chichibu Main Line Local	Mochida CR07 towards Hanyū
Location
- Location within Saitama Prefecture Location within Japan

Socio Distribution Center Station (ソシオ流通センター駅, Soshio Ryūtsū Sentā-eki) is a railway station on the Chichibu Main Line in Kumagaya, Saitama, Japan, operated by the private railway operator Chichibu Railway. The station opened on 1 April 2017.

== Lines ==
Socio Distribution Center Station is served by the 71.7 km (44.6 mi) Chichibu Main Line from Hanyū to Mitsumineguchi, and is located 11.6 km from Hanyū.

== Station layout ==
The station has a single 70 m long side platform serving the bidirectional single-track line. The station is located on the south side of the line with the station forecourt and drop-off/pick-up area for car users close to National Route 125.

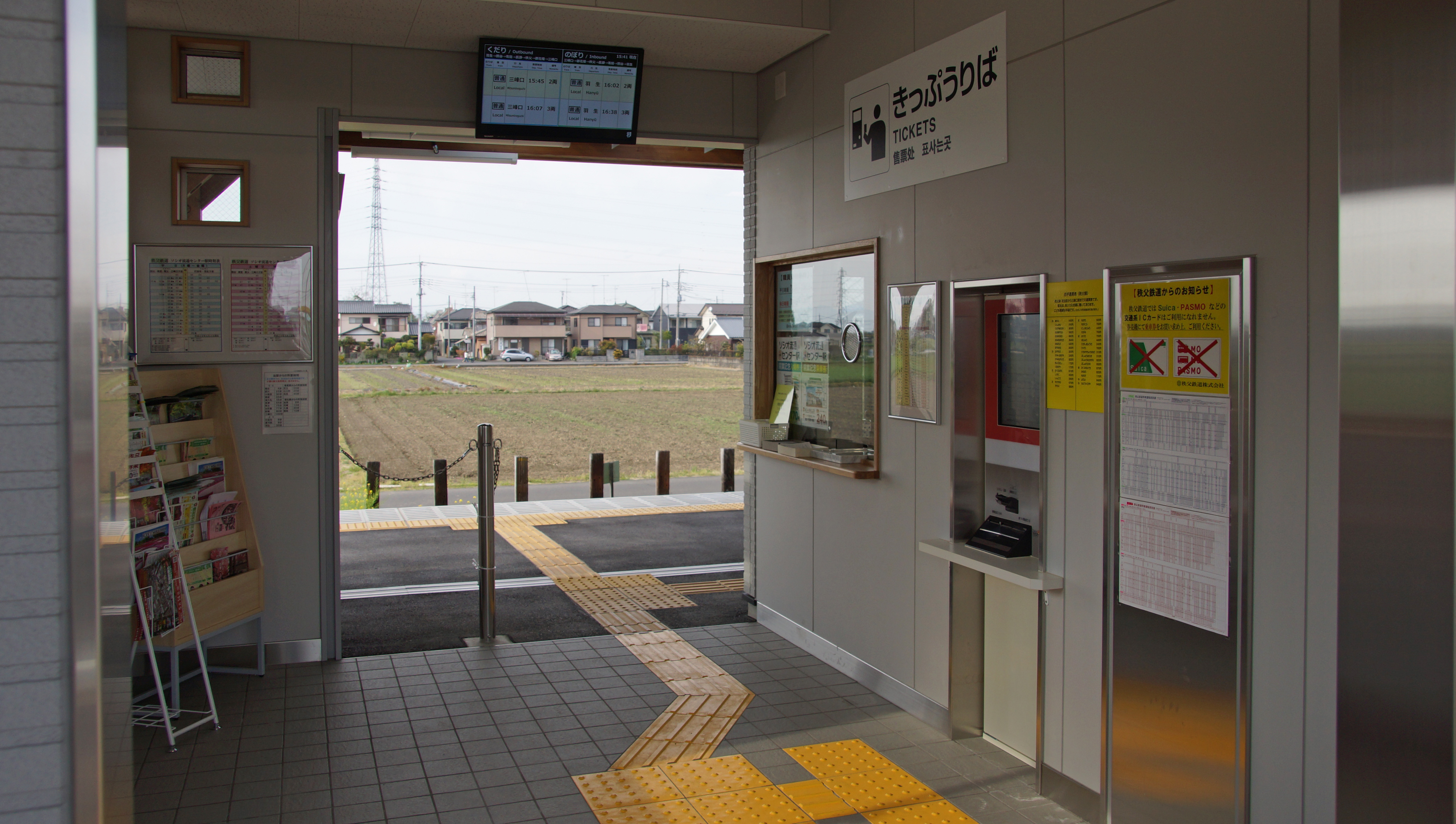
The entrance to the platform in April 2017

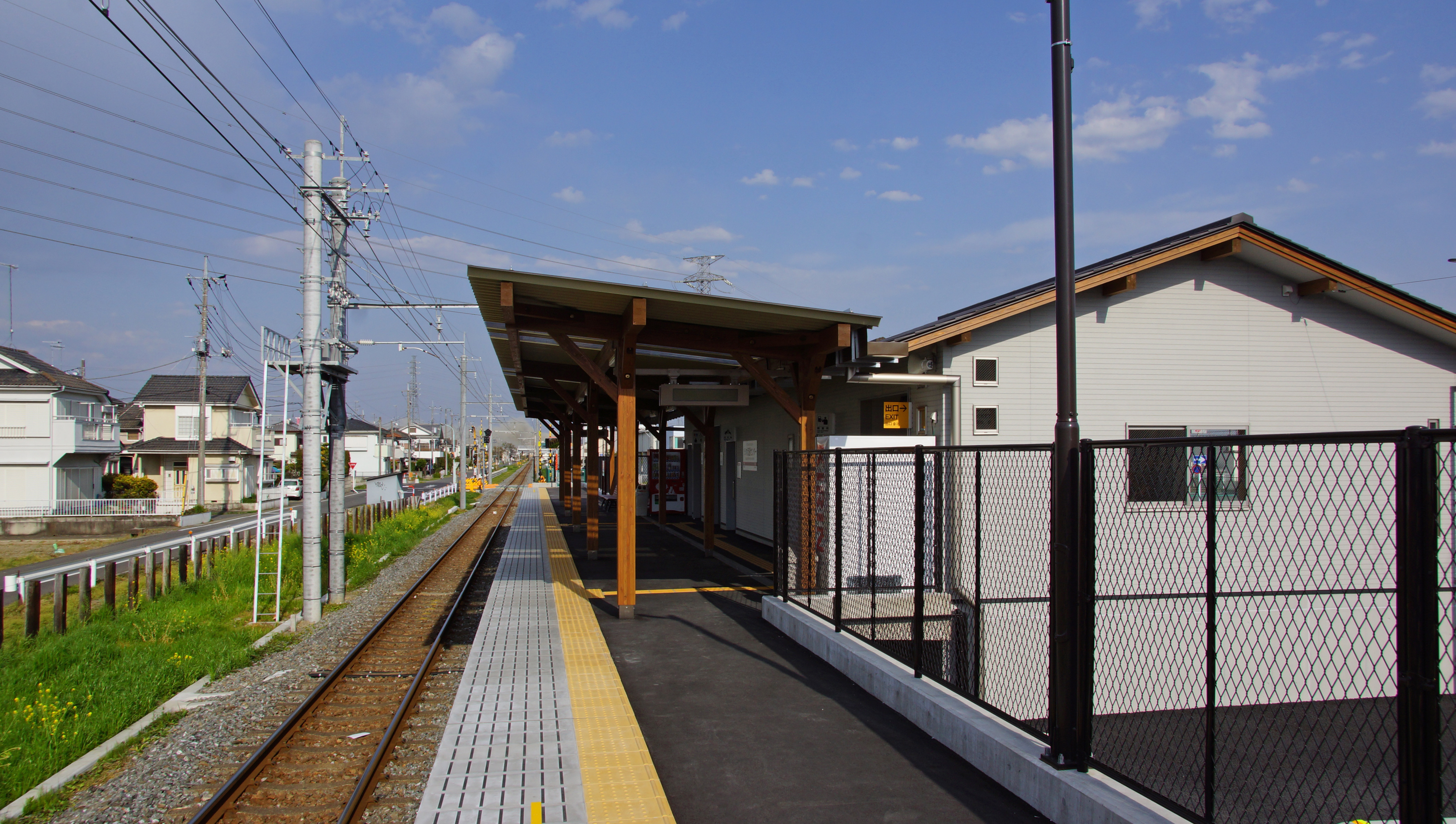
The platform viewed from the west end in April 2017

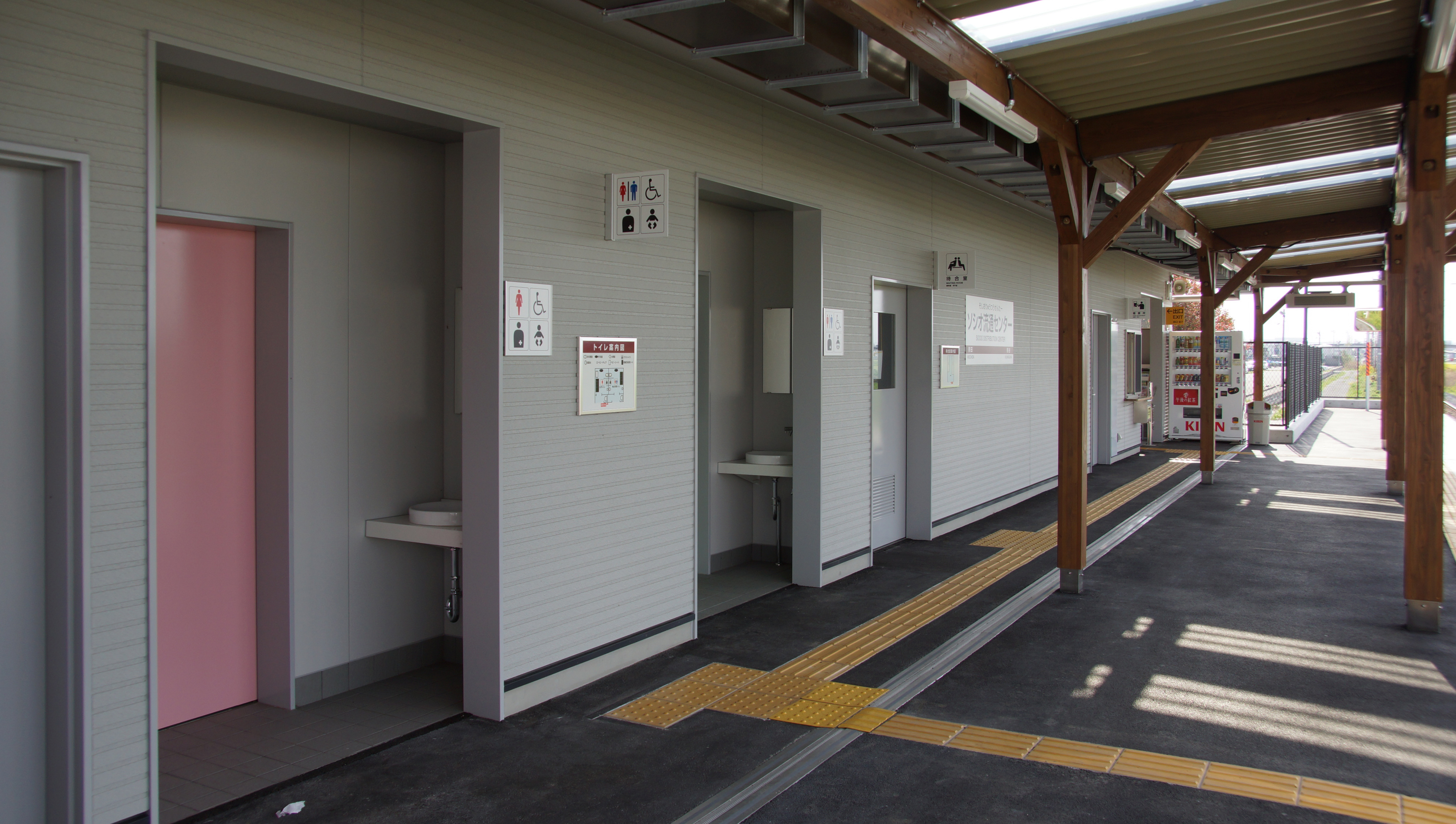
The passenger toilets in April 2017

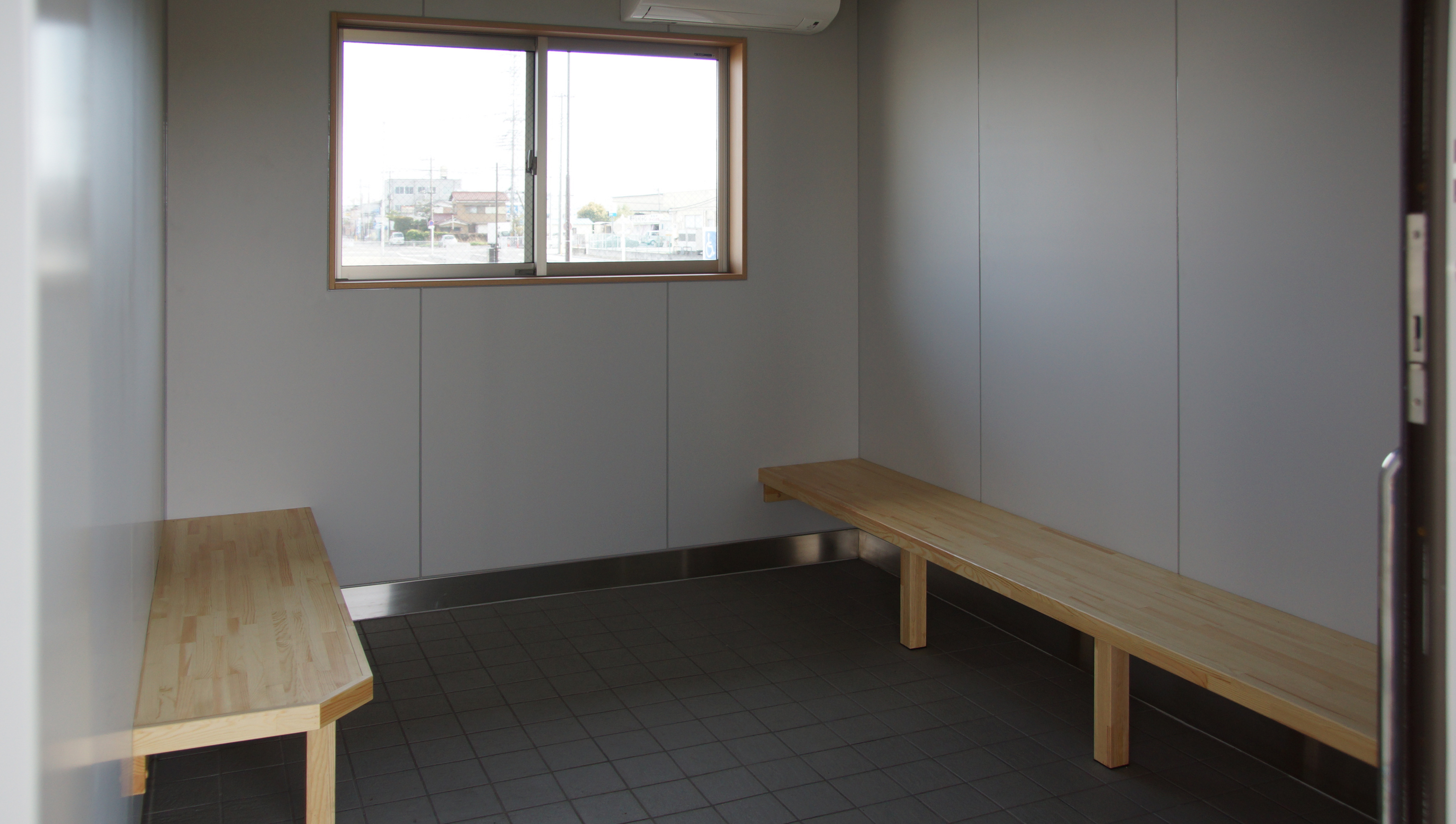
The passenger waiting room in April 2017

== History ==
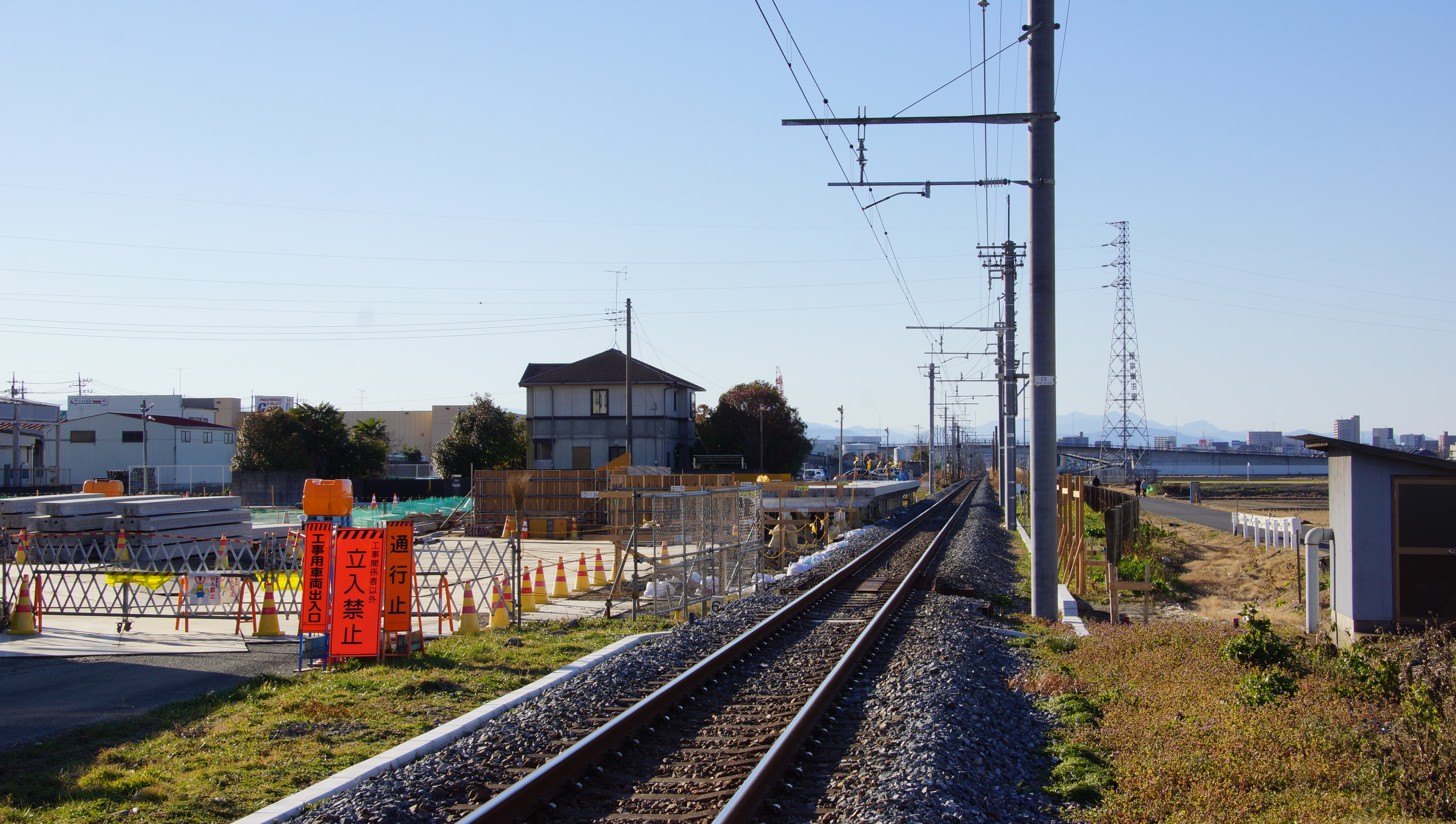
The station platform under construction in January 2017

The new station was proposed by the local community, with the cities of Kumagaya and Gyoda sharing the station construction cost of approximately JPY192 million. The name for the new station was officially announced in March 2016. A public poll was held to choose the name for the new station, with Ryūtsū Center (流通センター; lit. "Distribution Center") receiving the most votes, but the name "Socio Ryūtsū Center" was ultimately chosen, incorporating the nickname for the nearby Kumagaya Distribution Center, to avoid confusion with other stations similarly named (notably Ryūtsū Center Station on the Tokyo Monorail). Construction of the station structure and forecourt area commenced in fiscal 2016.

The station opened for passengers on 1 April 2017.

== Surrounding area ==
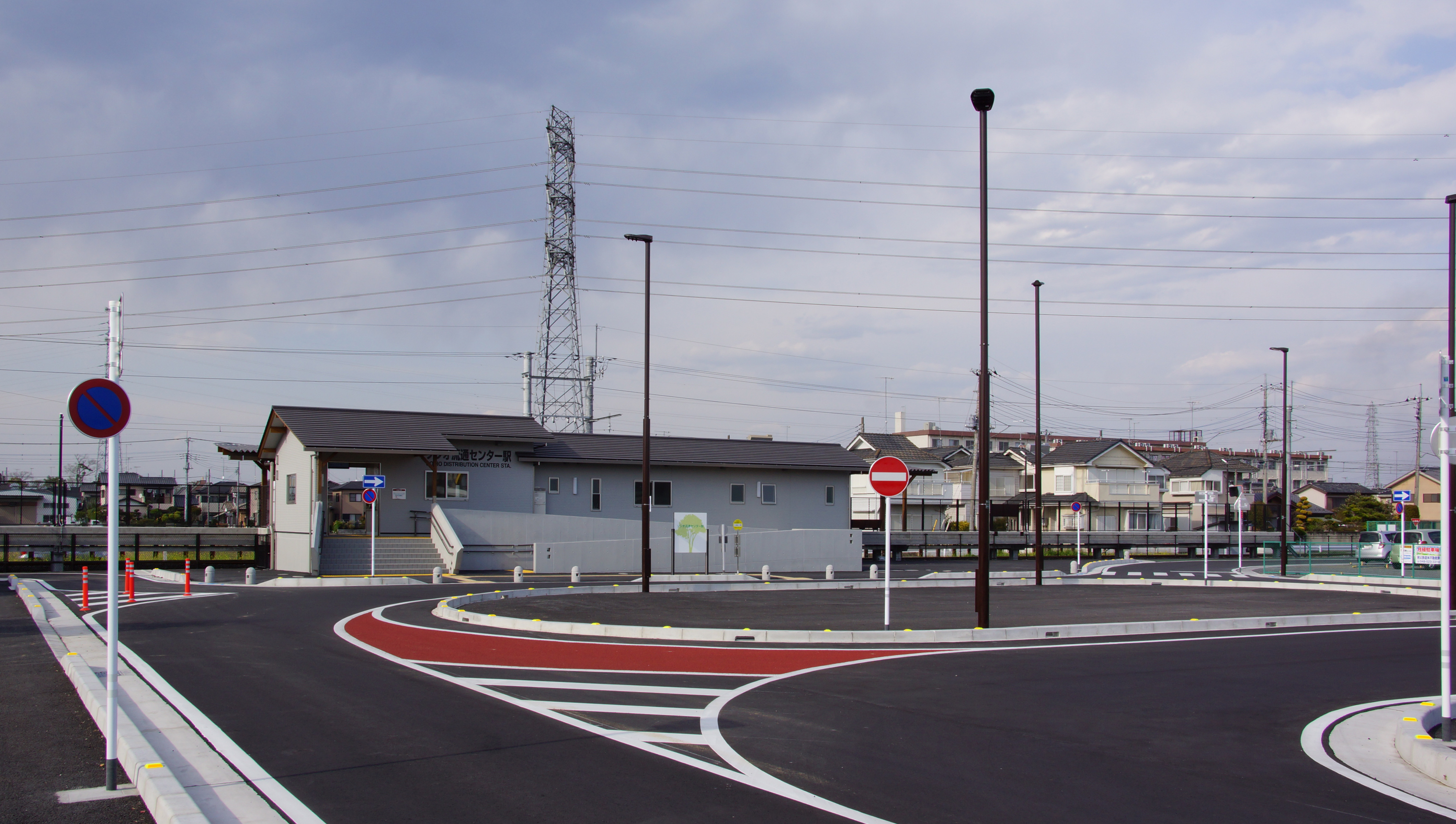
The station approach and forecourt in April 2017

The station is located in the city of Kumagaya, close to the border with the city of Gyoda.

- National Route 125
- Kumagaya Distribution Center
- Gyoda Driving School
- Kumagaya Higashi Junior High School
- Sayada Elementary School

== See also ==
- List of railway stations in Japan
