= Mochida Station =

Railway station in Gyōda, Saitama Prefecture, Japan

CR07 Mochida Station 持田駅
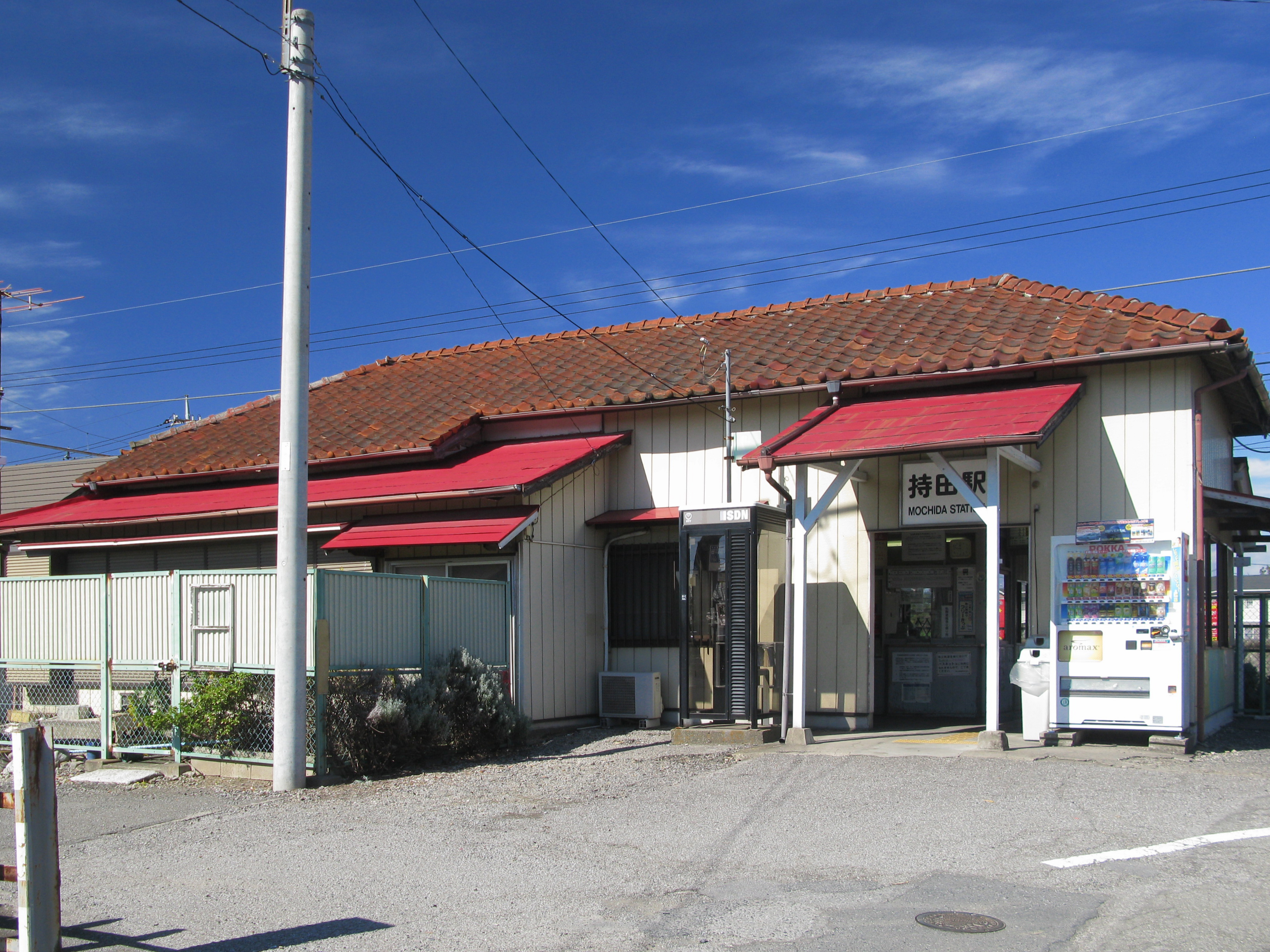
- Mochida Station in October 2012

General information
- Location: 4-6-1 Jōsai, Gyōda-shi, Saitama-ken 361-0057; Japan
- Coordinates: 36°8′15.66″N 139°26′31.83″E
- Operator: Chichibu Railway
- Line: ■ Chichibu Main Line
- Distance: 10.1 km from Hanyū
- Platforms: 1 island platform
- Tracks: 2

Other information
- Website: Official website

History
- Opened: 15 November 1924

Passengers
- FY2018: 938 daily

Services
Preceding station	Chichibu Railway	Following station
Socio Distribution Center CR08 towards Mitsumineguchi	Chichibu Main Line Local	Gyōdashi CR06 towards Hanyū
Location
- Location within Saitama Prefecture Location within Japan

Mochida Station (持田駅, Mochida-eki) is a passenger railway station located in the city of Gyōda, Saitama, Japan, operated by the private railway operator Chichibu Railway.

== Lines ==
Mochida Station is served by the 71.7 km Chichibu Main Line from Hanyū to Mitsumineguchi, and is located 10.1 km from Hanyū.

== Station layout ==
The station consists of a single island platform serving two tracks.

=== Platforms ===
1	■ Chichibu Main Line	for Kumagaya, Yorii, Chichibu, and Mitsumineguchi
2	■ Chichibu Main Line	for Gyōdashi and Hanyū

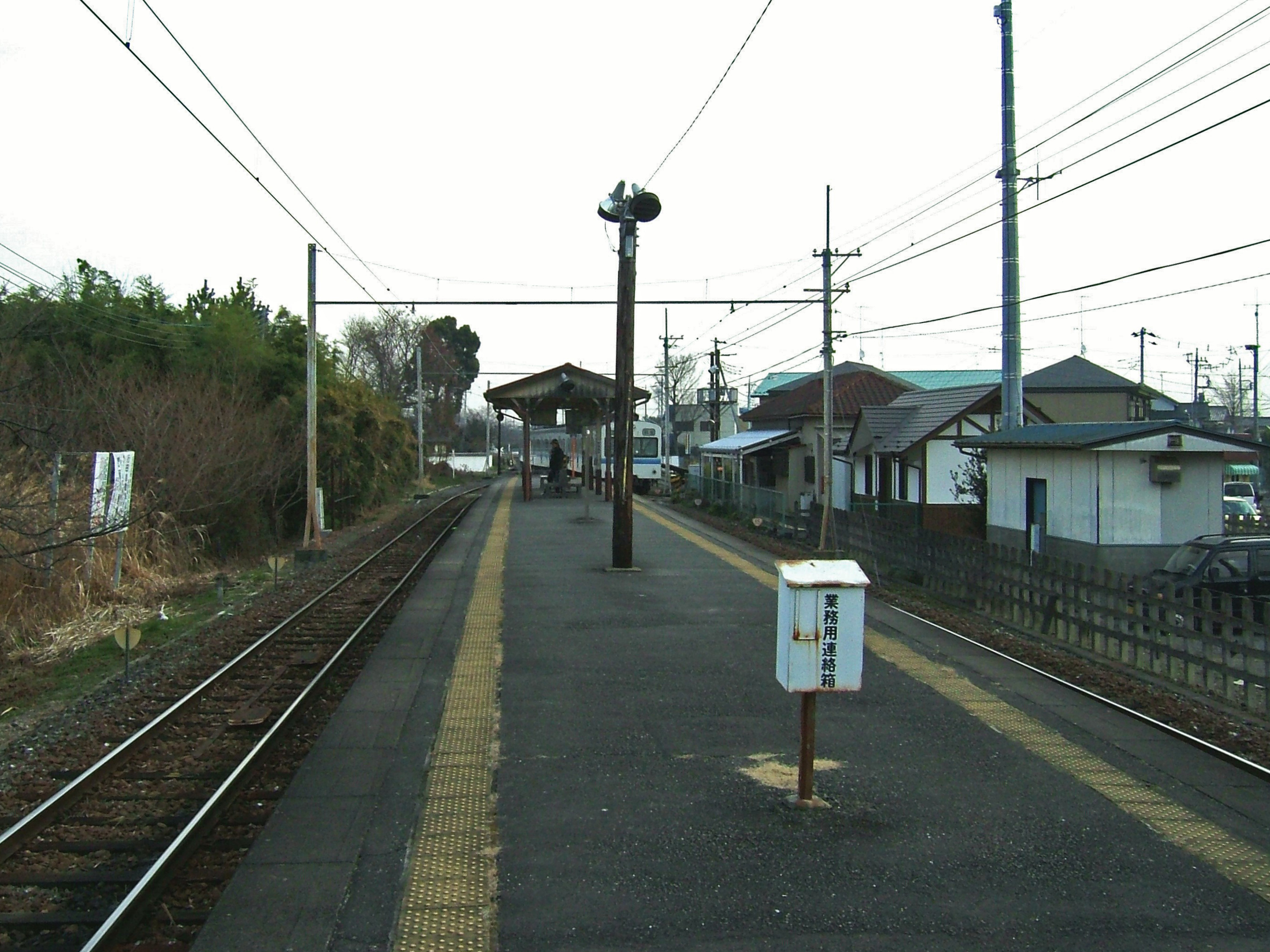
The platform in January 2008

== History ==
Mochida Station opened on 15 November 1924.

== Passenger statistics ==
In fiscal 2018, the station was used by an average of 938 passengers daily.

== Surrounding area ==
- National Route 125

== See also ==
- List of railway stations in Japan
