= Japan National Route 123 =

National highway in Japan

National Route 123
- 国道123号
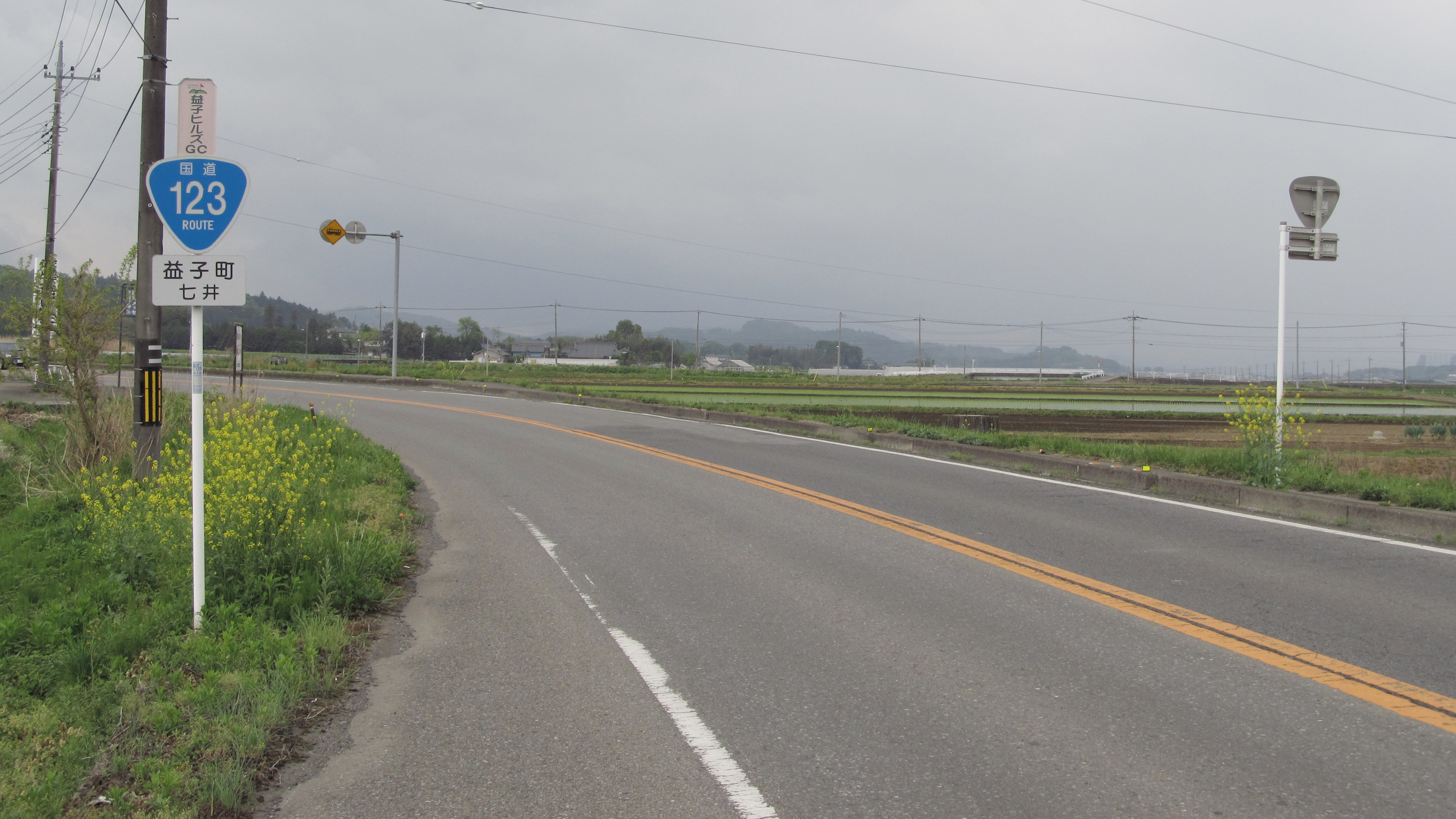

Route information
- Length: 70.0 km (43.5 mi)
- Existed: 1963–present

Major junctions
- West end: National Route 4 in Utsunomiya
- East end: National Route 118 in Mito, Ibaraki

Location
- Country: Japan

Highway system
- National highways of Japan; Expressways of Japan
← National Route 122	→ National Route 124

National Route 123 is a national highway of Japan connecting Utsunomiya and Mito, Ibaraki, in Japan, with a total length of 70 km (43.5 mi).

== History ==
Route 123 was originally designated on 18 May 1953 from Chiba to Mito. This was redesignated Route 51 on 1 April 1963 and the current Route 123 was designated the same day.
