= Saitama Junshin Junior College =

Coordinates: 36°9′44.7″N 139°31′31.7″E

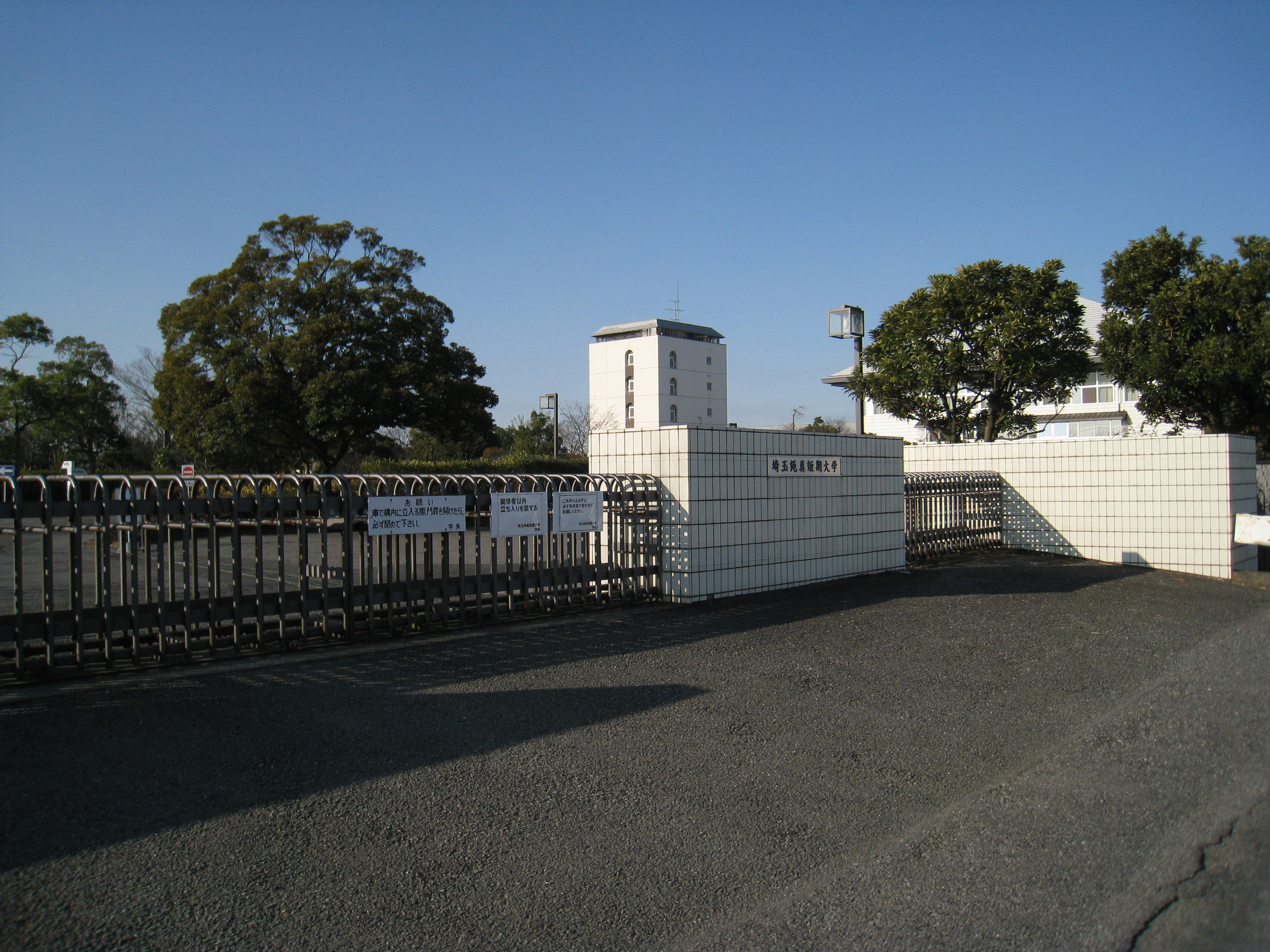

Saitama Junshin Junior College (埼玉純真短期大学, Saitama junshin tanki daigaku) is a private junior college in Hanyū, Saitama Prefecture, Japan, established in 1983 as Saitama Junshin Women's Junior College. The present name was adopted in 2007. The motto of the school is, Kihin (気品, refinement), Chisei (知性, intellect) and Hōshi (奉仕, service).
