= Japan National Route 126 =

National highway in Japan

National Route 126
- 国道126号
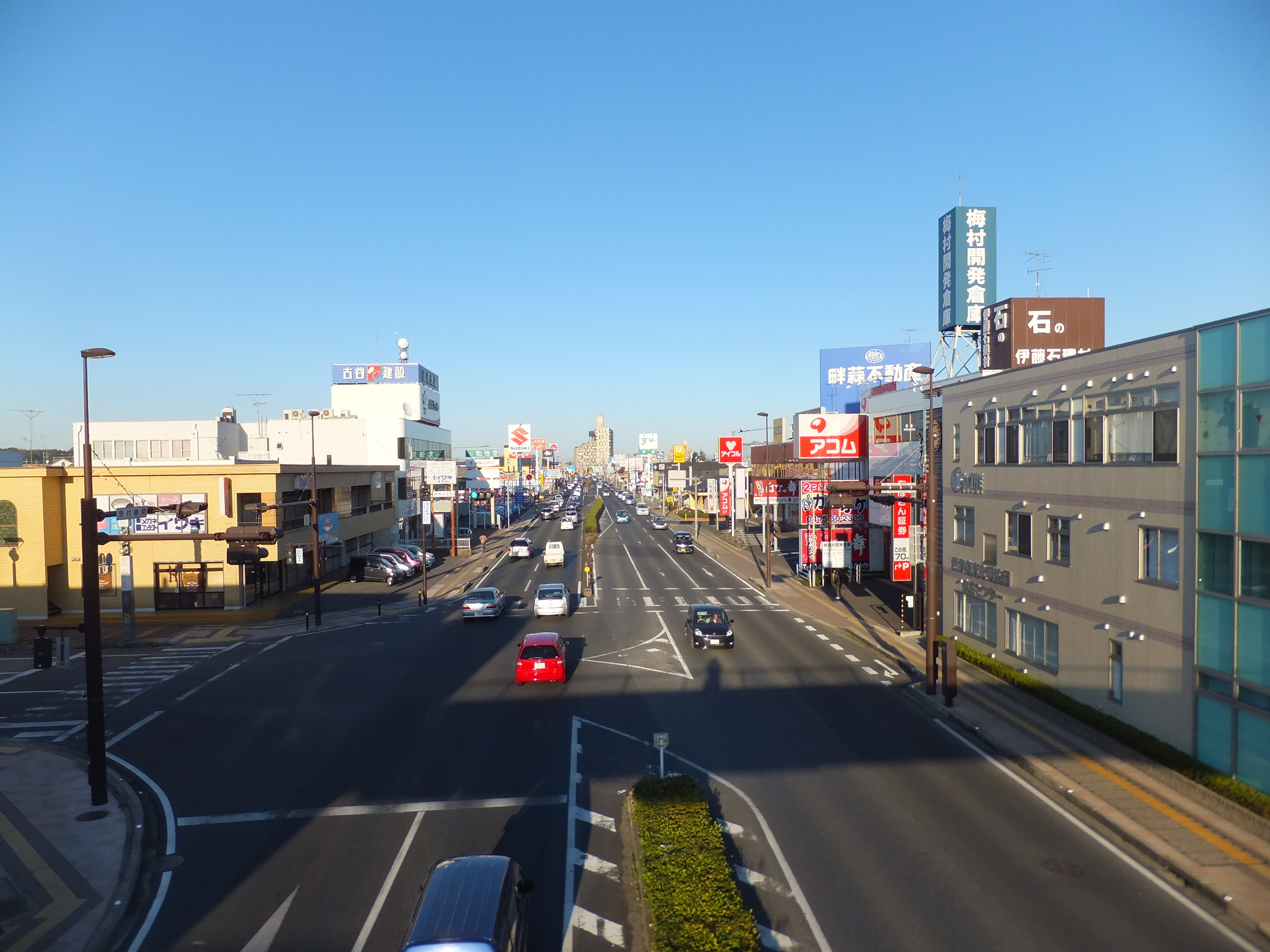
- Route 126 in Togane

Route information
- Length: 106.5 km (66.2 mi)
- Existed: 1953–present

Major junctions
- West end: Keiyō Road in Inage-ku, Chiba
- East end: National Route 124 / National Route 356 in Chōshi, Chiba

Location
- Country: Japan

Highway system
- National highways of Japan; Expressways of Japan
← National Route 125	→ National Route 127

National Route 126 is a national highway of Japan connecting Chōshi, Chiba, and Inage-ku, Chiba, in Japan, with a total length of 106.5 km (66.18 mi).
