= Japan National Route 124 =

National highway in Japan

National Route 124
- 国道124号
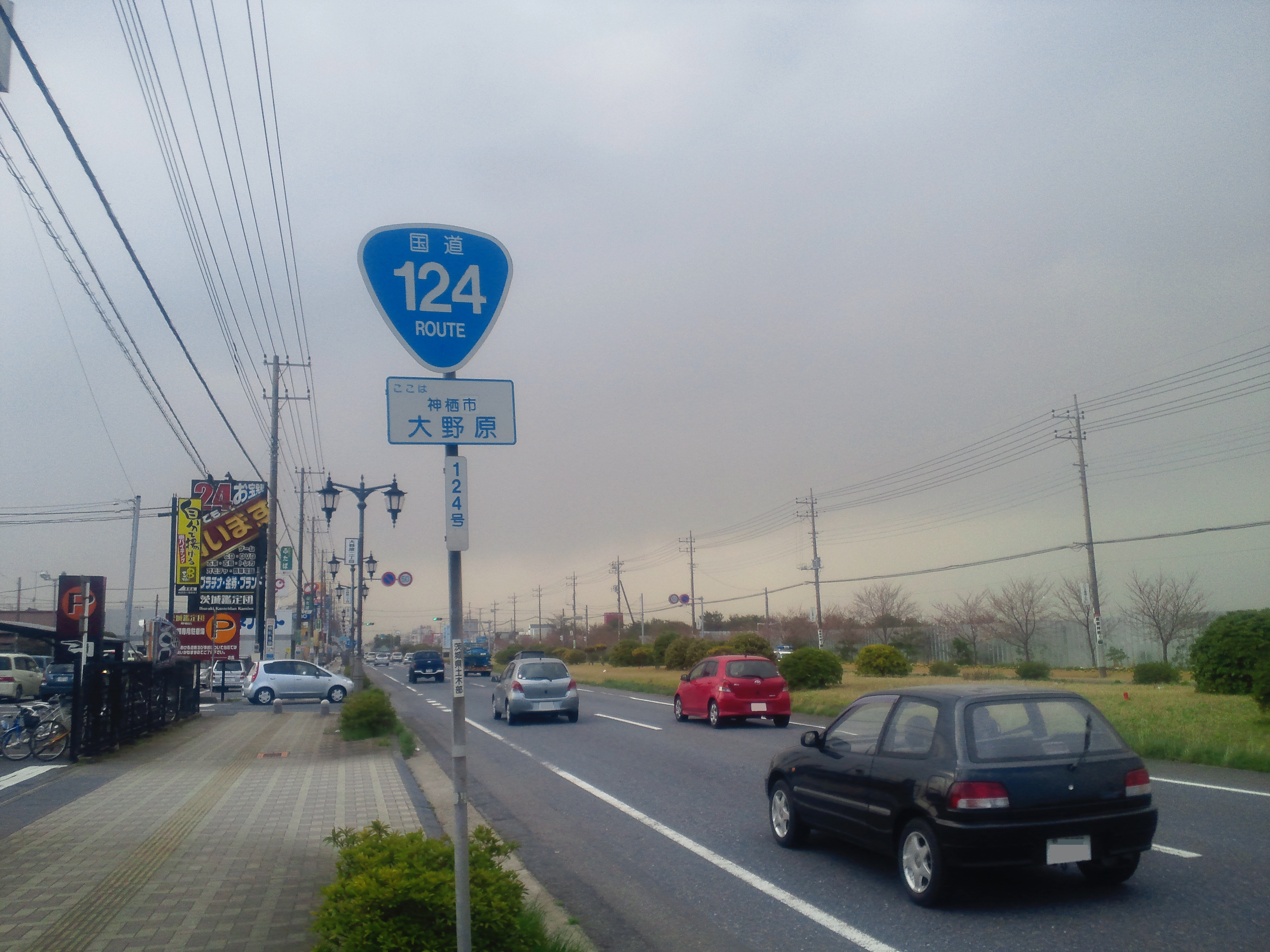

Route information
- Length: 88.1 km (54.7 mi)
- Existed: 1953–present

Major junctions
- South end: National Route 126 / National Route 356 / Prefectural Road 37 in Chōshi, Chiba
- North end: National Route 50 in Mito, Ibaraki

Location
- Country: Japan

Highway system
- National highways of Japan; Expressways of Japan
← National Route 123	→ National Route 125

National Route 124 is a national highway of Japan connecting between Chōshi, Chiba and Mito, Ibaraki in Japan, with total length has 88.1 km (54.74 mi).
