= Hanyū =

Hanyū 羽生市
- City
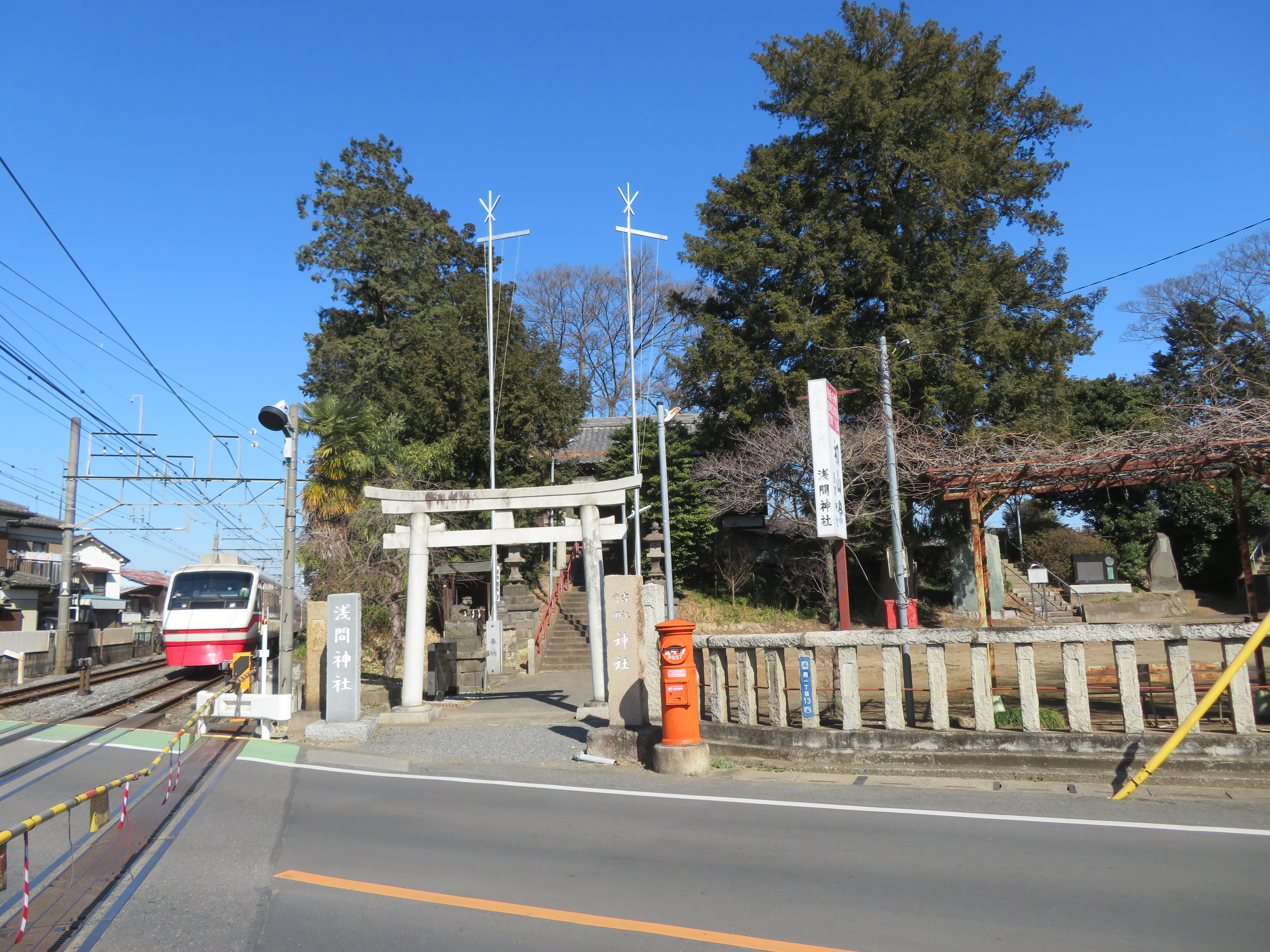
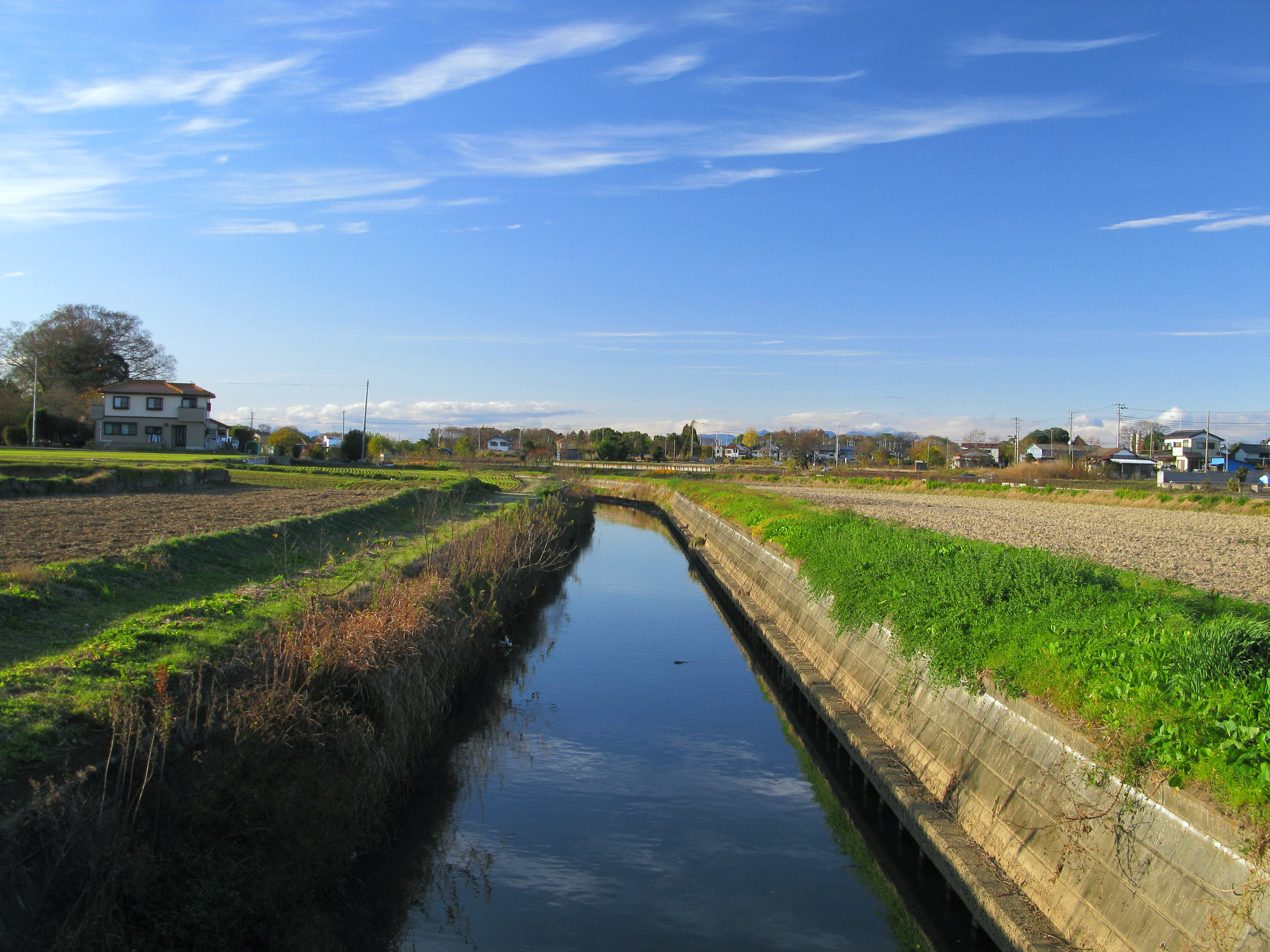
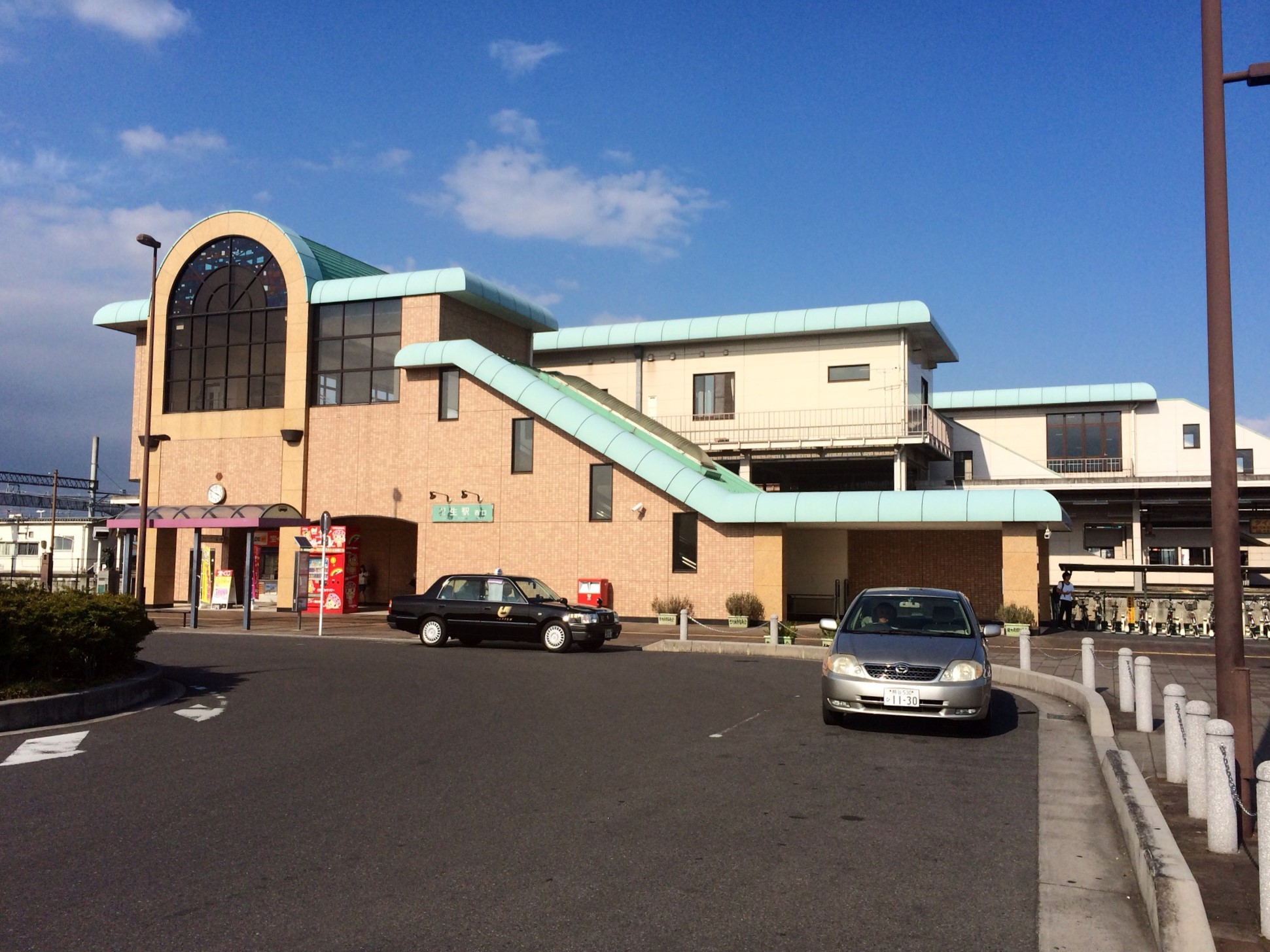
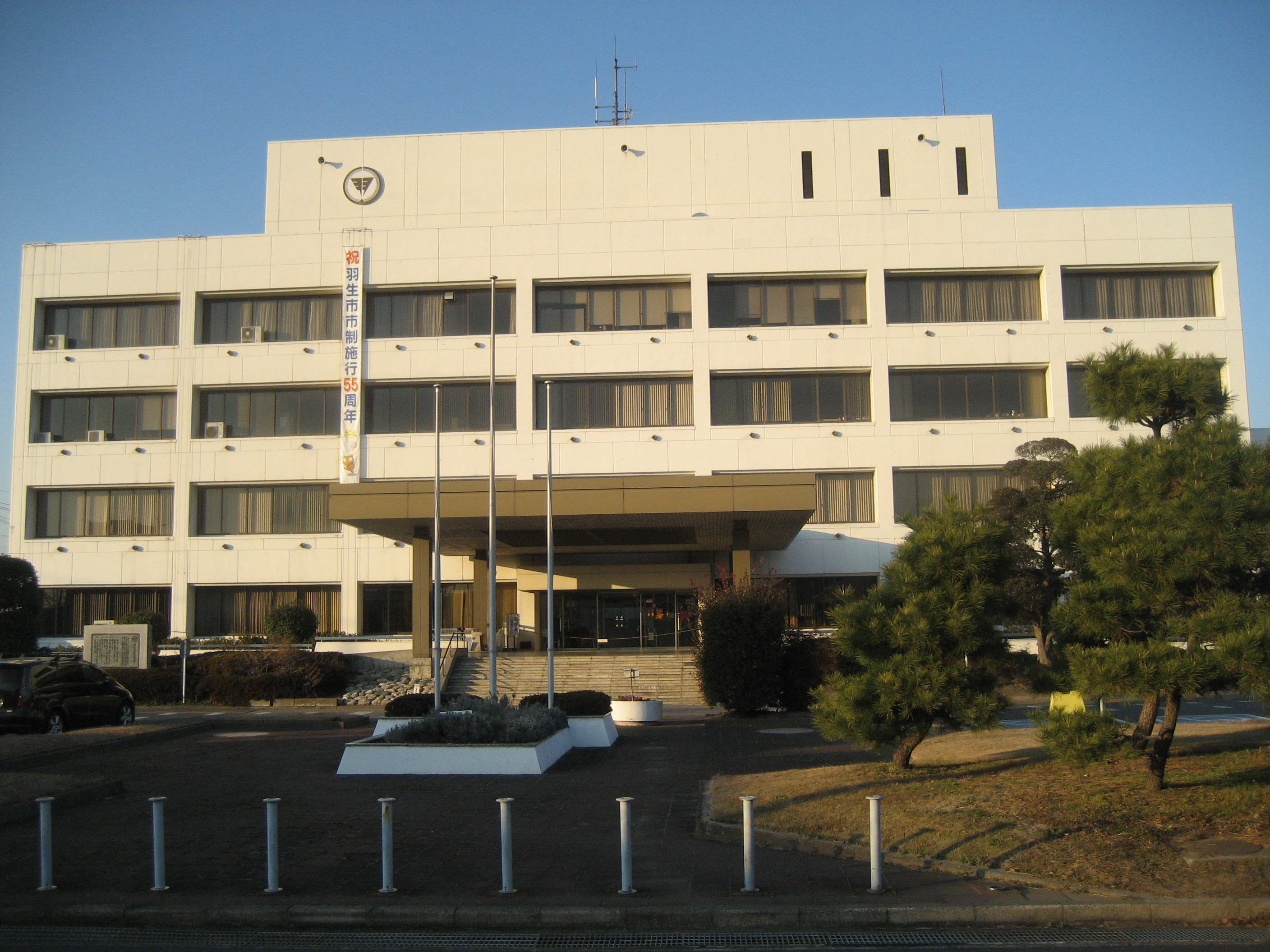
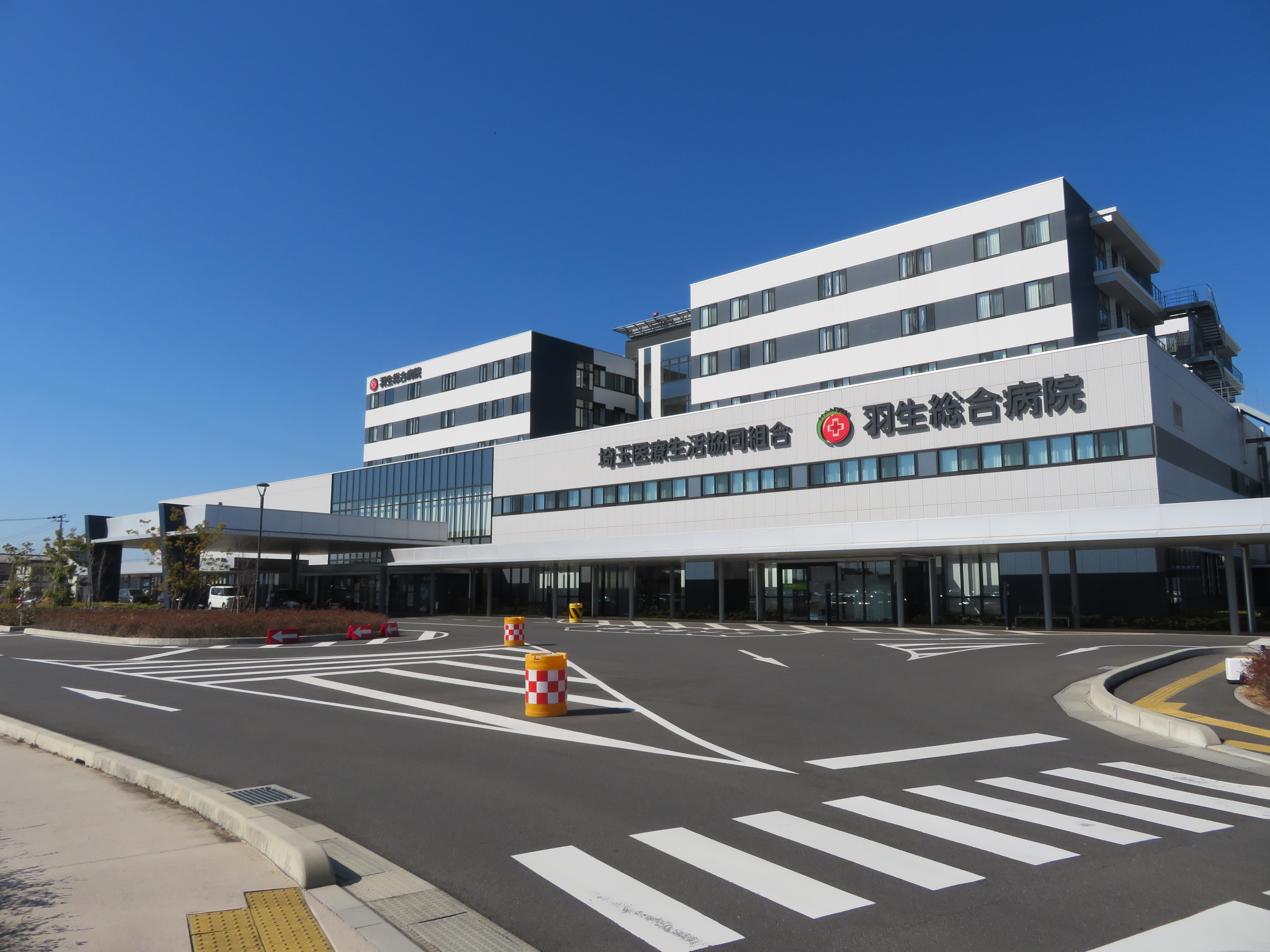
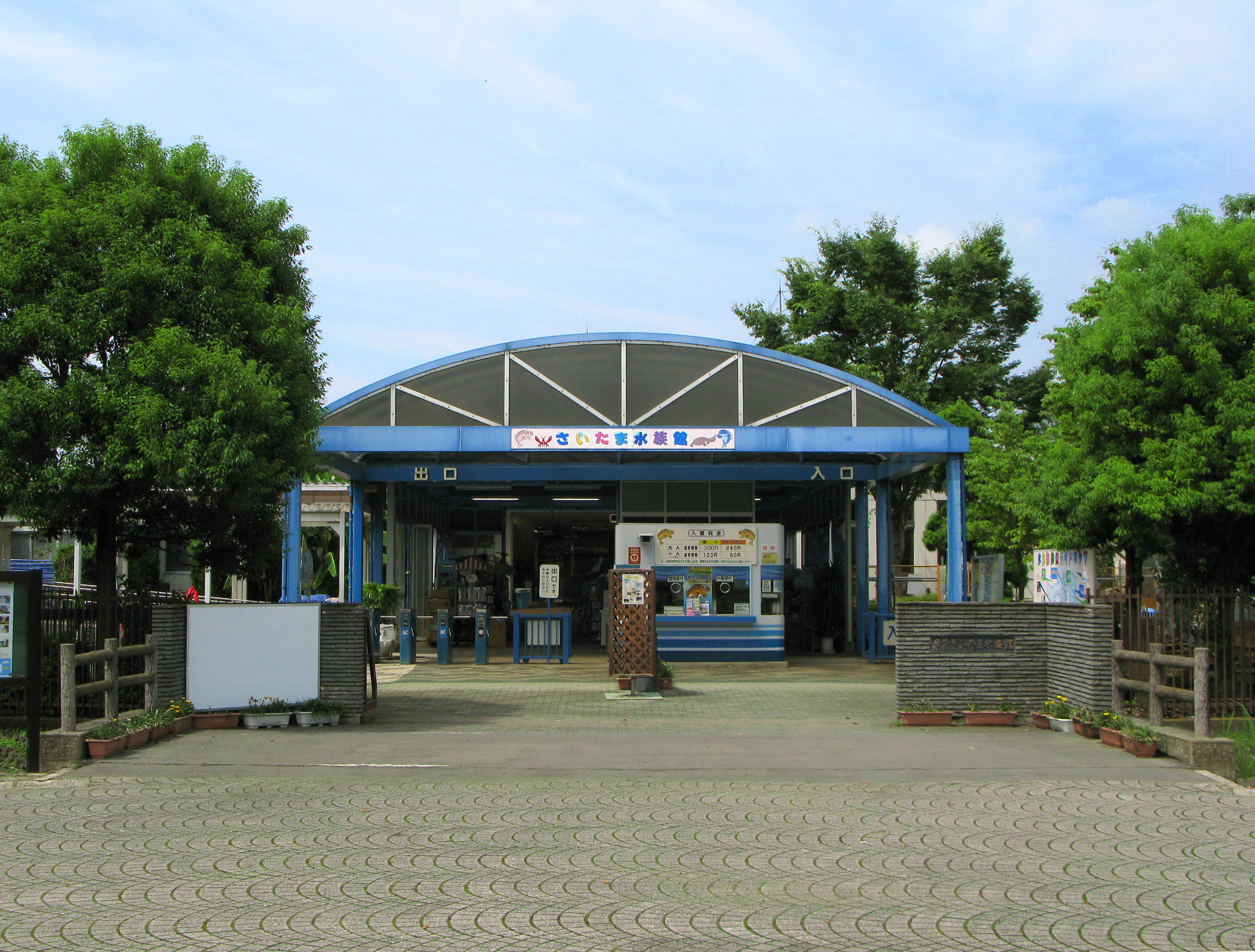
- Bishamon'yama Ancient Tomb Aino River Hanyū Station Hanyu City Hall Hanyu General Hospital Saitama Aquarium Hanyū City Hall

- Flag Seal

- Location of Hanyū in Saitama Prefecture

- Location within Japan
- Coordinates: 36°10′21.5″N 139°32′54.5″E
- Country: Japan
- Region: Kantō
- Prefecture: Saitama
- First official recorded: 2,500 BC (official estimated)
- City settled: September 1, 1954

Government
  - Mayor: Makiko Saitō (斎藤万紀子) - from June 2026

Area
  - Total: 58.64 km^{2} (22.64 sq mi)

Population (January 2021)
  - Total: 54,304
  - Density: 926.1/km^{2} (2,398/sq mi)
- Time zone: UTC+9 (Japan Standard Time)
- Tree: Osmanthus fragrans
- Flower: Wisteria floribunda
- Phone number: 048-561-1121
- Address: 6-15 Higashi, Hanyu-shi, Saitama-ken 348-8601
- Website: Official website

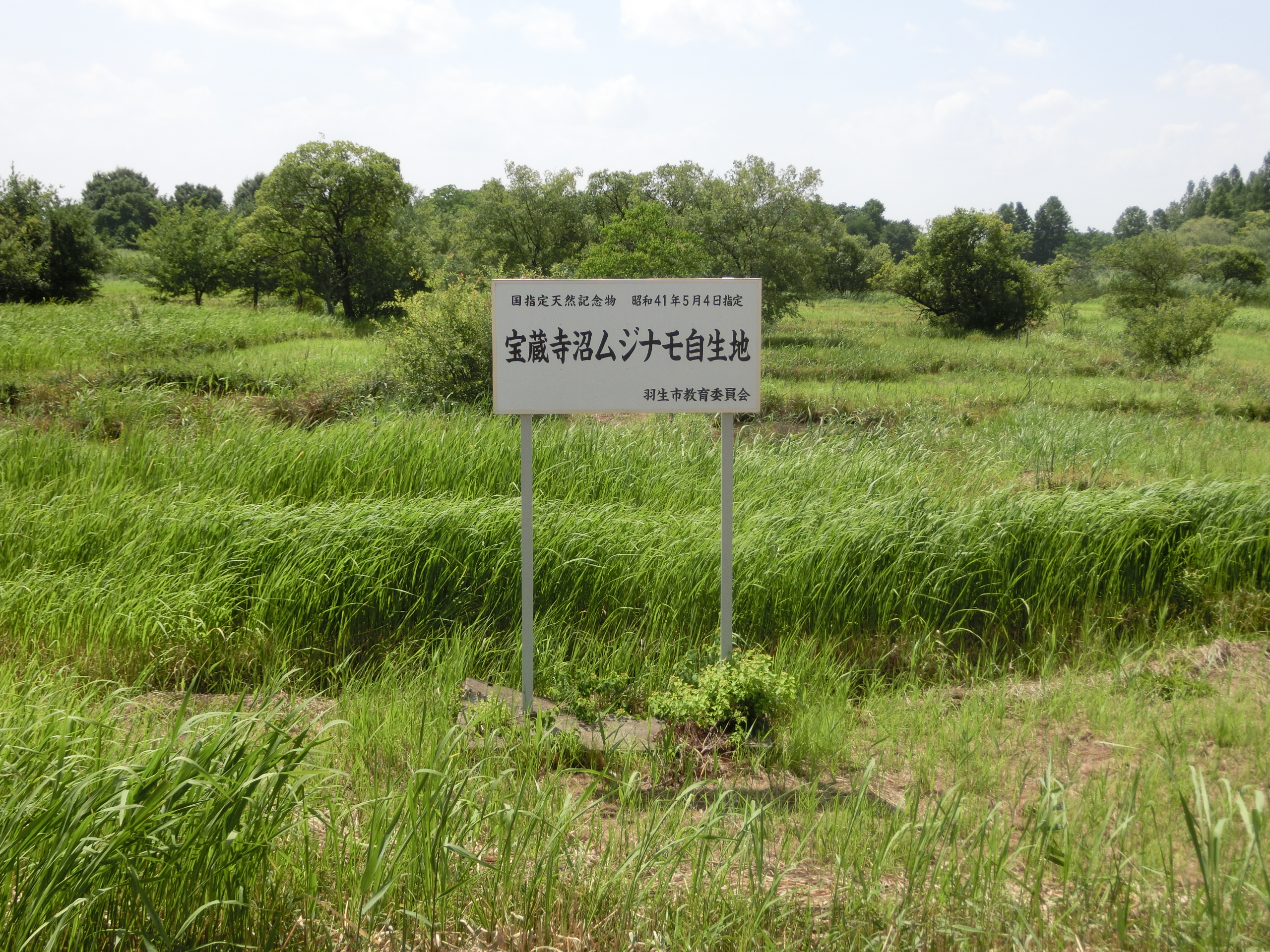
Hozoji-numa Aldrovanda vesiculosa Habitat (Natural Monument)

Hanyū (羽生市, Hanyū-shi) is a city located in Saitama Prefecture, Japan. As of 1 January 2021, the city had an estimated population of 54,304 in 23,487 households and a population density of 930 persons per km^{2}. The total area of the city is 58.64 square kilometres (22.64 sq mi).

== Geography ==
Hanyū is located in the most northern part of Saitama Prefecture, with the Tone River on its northern border. Before the river was redirected to its current course to control flooding, it used to flow through the city. This river was used as a major shipping route for locally produced textiles and goods from further up river. Hanyū flourished as a stopping point on the long ride toward Tokyo. Today only an irrigation channel remains in the approximate location of the original river path.

=== Surrounding municipalities ===
Gunma Prefecture

- Itakura
- Meiwa

Saitama Prefecture

- Gyōda
- Kazo

=== Climate ===
Hanyū has a humid subtropical climate (Köppen Cfa) characterized by warm summers and cool winters with light to no snowfall. The average annual temperature in Hanyū is 14.6 °C. The average annual rainfall is 1300 mm with September as the wettest month. The temperatures are highest on average in August, at around 26.7 °C, and lowest in January, at around 3.4 °C.

== Demographics ==
Per Japanese census data, the population of Hanyū peaked in around the year 2000 and has declined slightly over the past 20 years.

Historical population
Year	Pop.	±%
1920	30,930	—
1930	32,714	+5.8%
1940	33,570	+2.6%
1950	42,623	+27.0%
1960	43,900	+3.0%
1970	45,001	+2.5%
1980	48,488	+7.7%
1990	53,764	+10.9%
2000	57,499	+6.9%
2010	56,204	−2.3%
2020	52,862	−5.9%

== History ==
The village of Hanyū was created within Kitasaitama District, Saitama with the establishment of the modern municipalities system on April 1, 1889. On September 1, 1954 Hanyū merged with the neighboring villages of Shingō, Sukage, Iwase, Kawamata, Iizumi, and Tegobayashi and was elevated to city status. The village of Chiyoda was annexed on April 1, 1959.

== Government ==
Hanyū has a mayor-council form of government with a directly elected mayor and a unicameral city council of 14 members. Hanyū contributes one member to the Saitama Prefectural Assembly. In terms of national politics, the city is part of Saitama 12th district of the lower house of the Diet of Japan.

== Economy ==
Traditional industries of Hanyū included textile dying and clothing production. The area was famous of its indigo production in the Edo period. Akebono Brake Industry is headquartered in Hanyū.

== Education ==
- Saitama Junshin Junior College
- Hanyū has 11 public elementary schools and three public middle schools operated by the city government, and four public high schools operated by the Saitama Prefectural Board of Education. The prefecture also operates one special education school for the handicapped.

== Transportation ==
=== Railway ===
Tobu Railway - Tobu Isesaki Line

- Minami-Hanyū - Hanyū

Chichibu Railway – Chichibu Main Line

- Hanyū - Nishi-Hanyū - Shingō

=== Highways ===
- Tōhoku Expressway – Hanyū Interchange – Hanyū Parking Area
- National Route 122
- National Route 125

== Local attractions ==
- Saitama Aquarium

== Sister cities ==
- Baguio, Philippines, since February 11, 1969
- Kaneyama, Fukushima, Japan, friendship city since 1982
- Durbuy, Belgium, since November 4, 1994
- Millbrae, CA, United States, since 2014
