= Gyōdashi Station =

Railway station in Gyōda, Saitama Prefecture, Japan

CR06 Gyōdashi Station 行田市駅
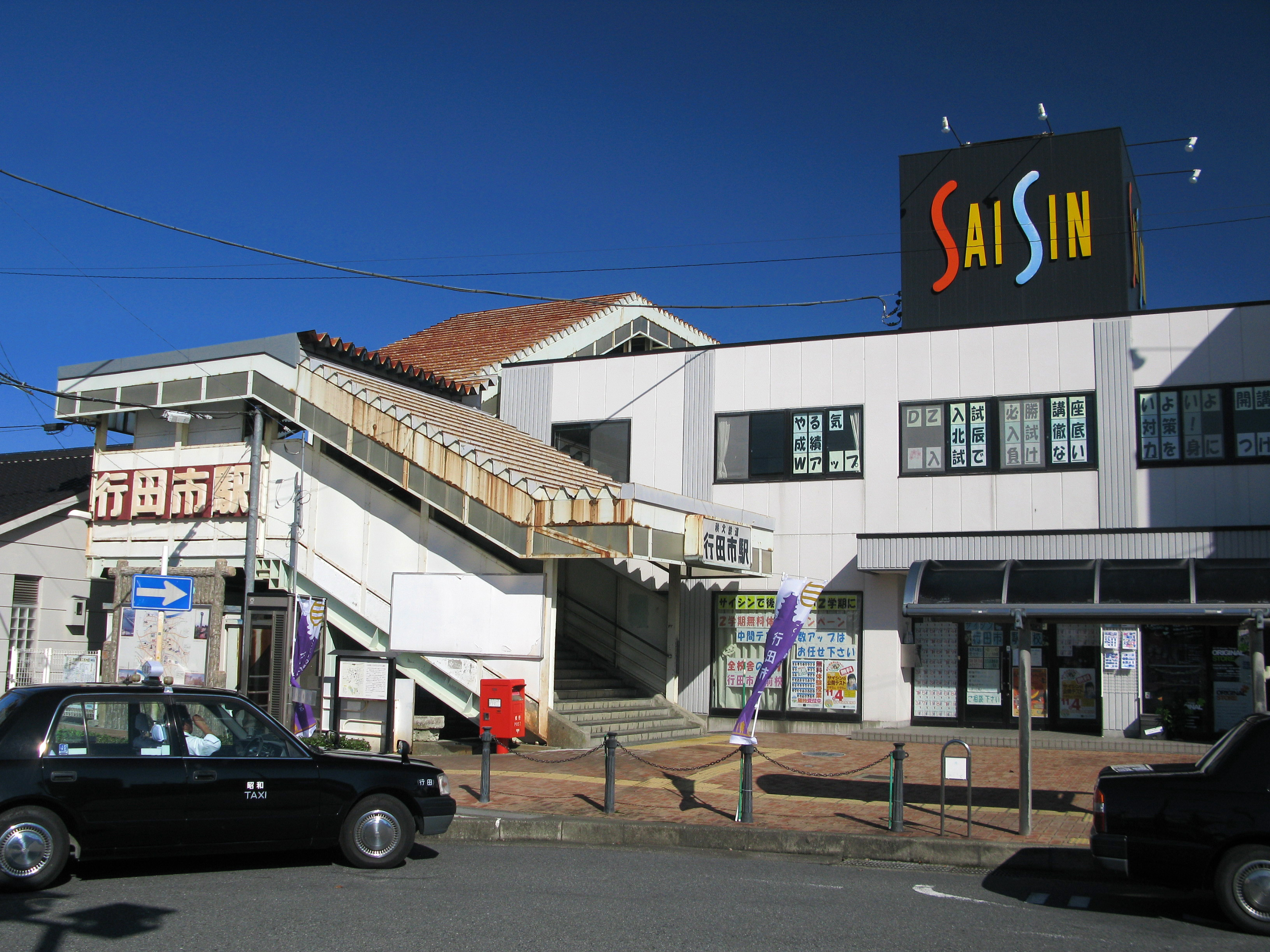
- The south entrance to Gyodashi Station in October 2012

General information
- Location: 19-18 Chūō, Gyōda-shi, Saitama-ken 361-0078; Japan
- Coordinates: 36.143572°N 139.459108°E
- Operator: Chichibu Railway
- Line: ■ Chichibu Main Line
- Distance: 8.3 km from Hanyū
- Platforms: 1 island platform
- Tracks: 2
- Connections: Bus stop

Construction
- Parking: Yes
- Accessible: Access ramps Universal access toilet

Other information
- Website: Official website

History
- Opened: 1 April 1921
- Former names: Gyōda (until 1966)

Passengers
- FY2018: 1718 daily

Services
Preceding station	Chichibu Railway	Following station
Kumagaya CR09 towards Mitsumineguchi	Chichibu Main Line Rapid Chichibuji	Hanyū CR01 Terminus
Mochida CR07 towards Mitsumineguchi	Chichibu Main Line Local	Higashi-Gyōda CR05 towards Hanyū
Location
- Location within Saitama Prefecture Location within Japan

Gyōdashi Station (行田市駅, Gyōdashi-eki) is a passenger railway station located in the city of Gyōda, Saitama, Japan, operated by the private railway operator Chichibu Railway

== Lines ==
Gyōdashi Station is served by the 71.7 km Chichibu Main Line from Hanyū to Mitsumineguchi, and is located 8.3 km from Hanyū. Chichibuji express services stop at this station.

== Station layout ==
The station consists of a single island platform serving two tracks.

=== Platforms ===
1	■ Chichibu Main Line	for Kumagaya, Yorii, Chichibu, and Mitsumineguchi
2	■ Chichibu Main Line	for Hanyū

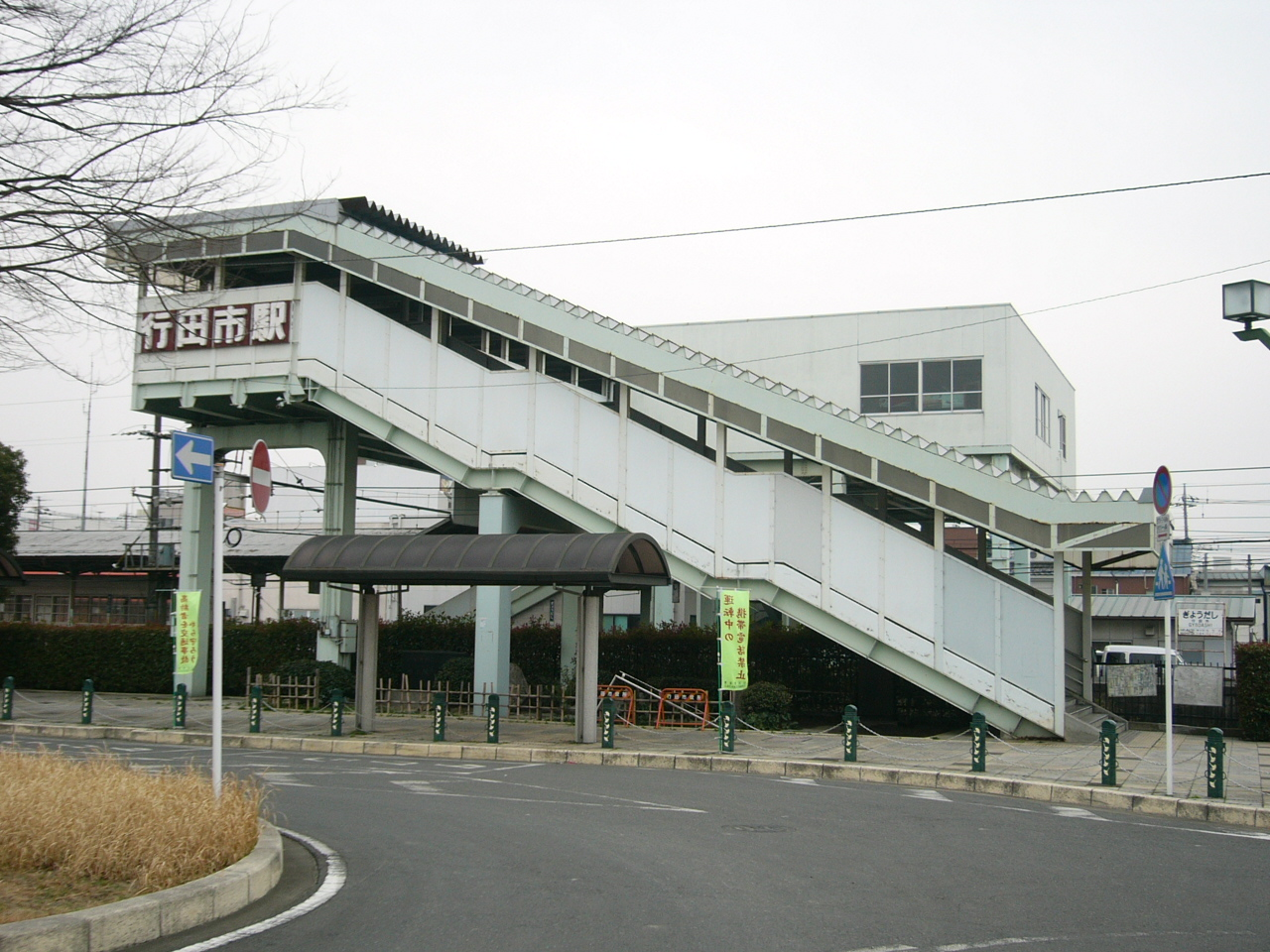
The north entrance in May 2006

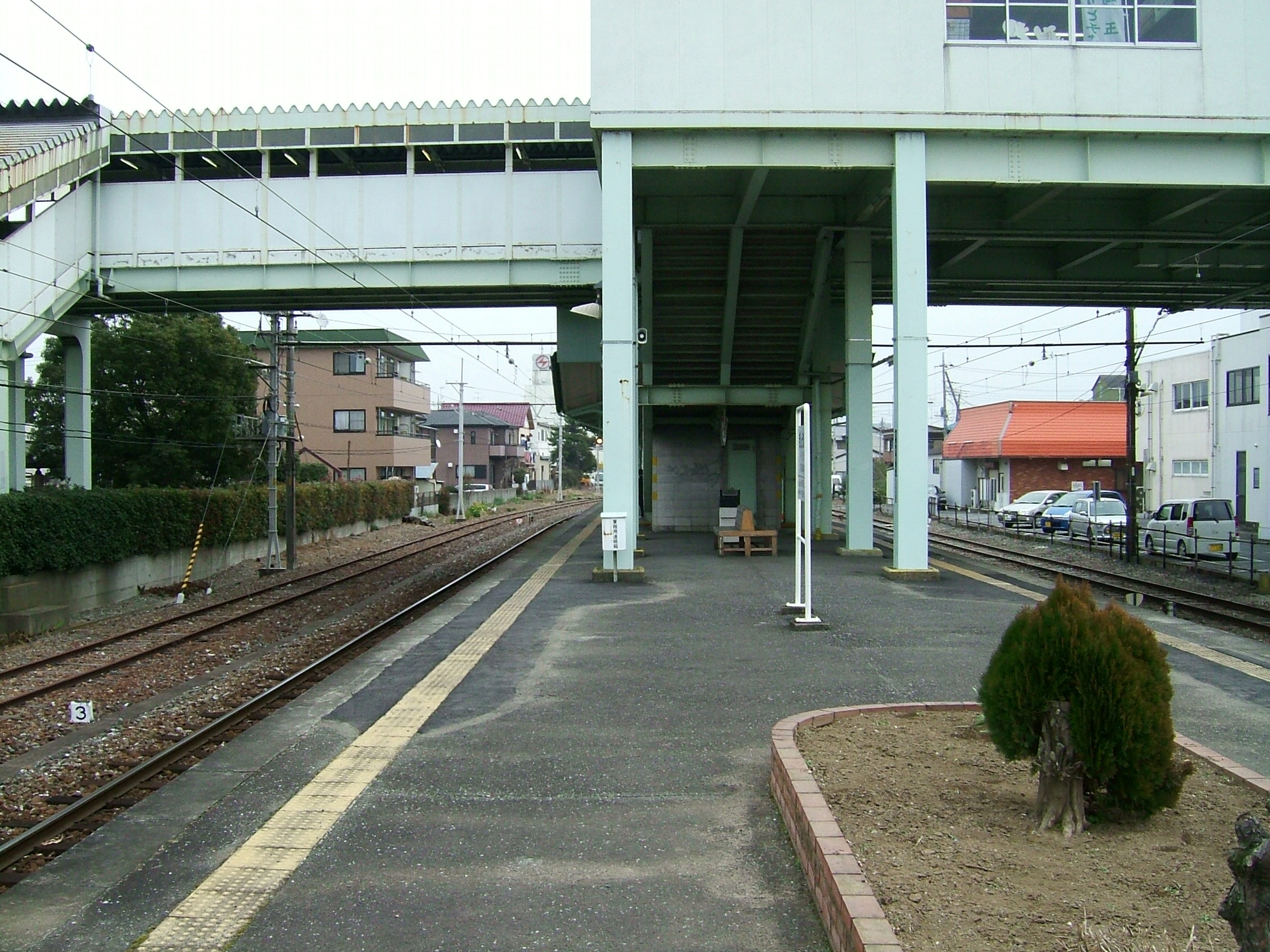
The platform in January 2008

== History ==
The station opened on 1 April 1921 as Gyōda Station. It was renamed Gyōdashi Station from 1 June 1966 to distinguish it from Gyōda Station on the JNR Takasaki Line.

== Passenger statistics ==
In fiscal 2018, the station was used by an average of 1718 passengers daily.

== Surrounding area ==
- Gyōda City Office
