= Japan National Route 125 =

Road in Japan

National Route 125
- 国道125号
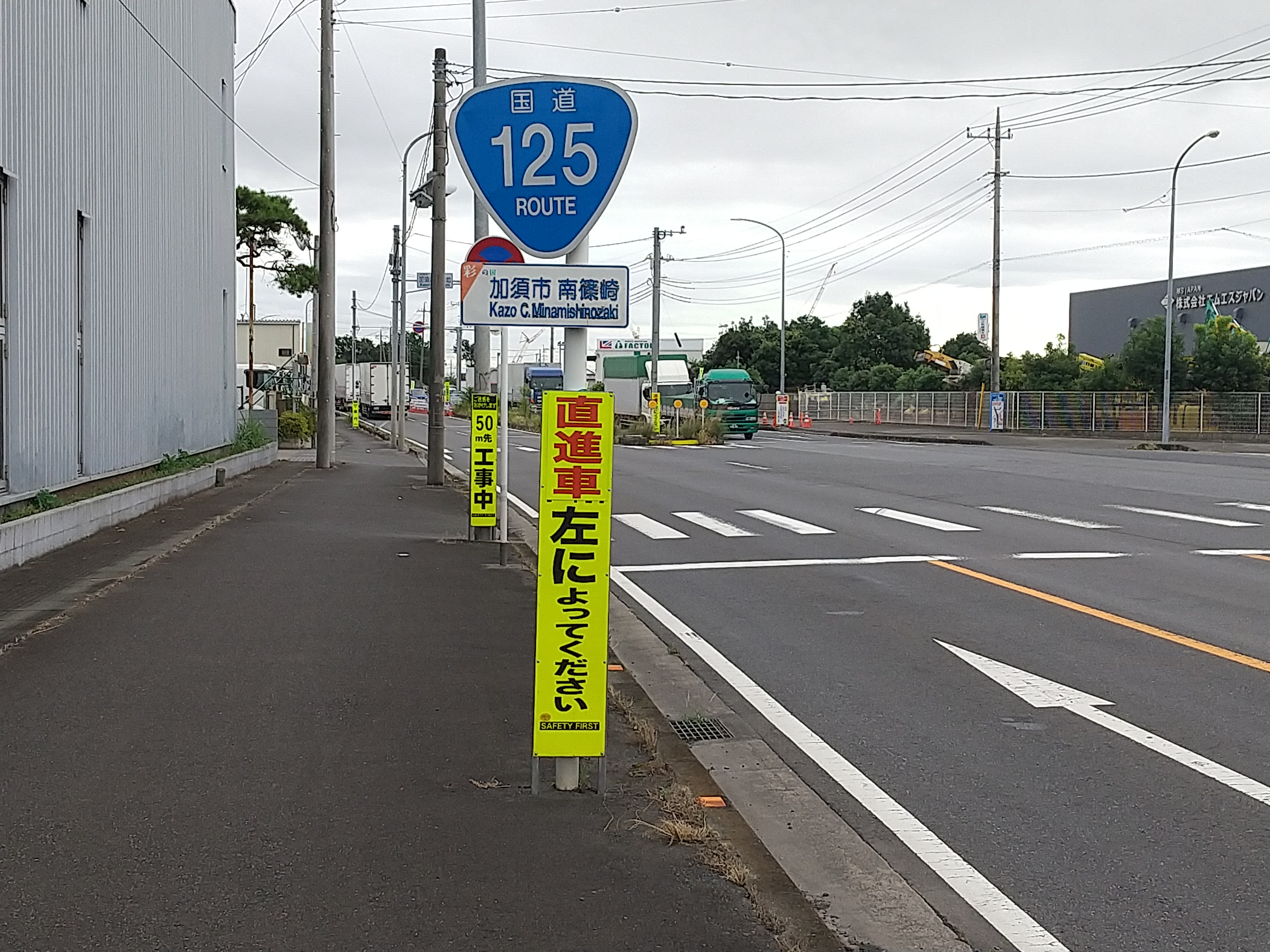

Route information
- Length: 128.4 km (79.8 mi)
- Existed: 1953–present

Major junctions
- West end: National Route 51 in Katori, Chiba

Location
- Country: Japan

Highway system
- National highways of Japan; Expressways of Japan
← National Route 124	→ National Route 126

National Route 125 is a national highway of Japan connecting Katori, Chiba and Kumagaya, Saitama in Japan, with a total length of 128.4 km (79.78 mi).
