= Hagure Station =

Railway station in Yorii, Saitama Prefecture, Japan

CR21 Hagure Station 波久礼駅
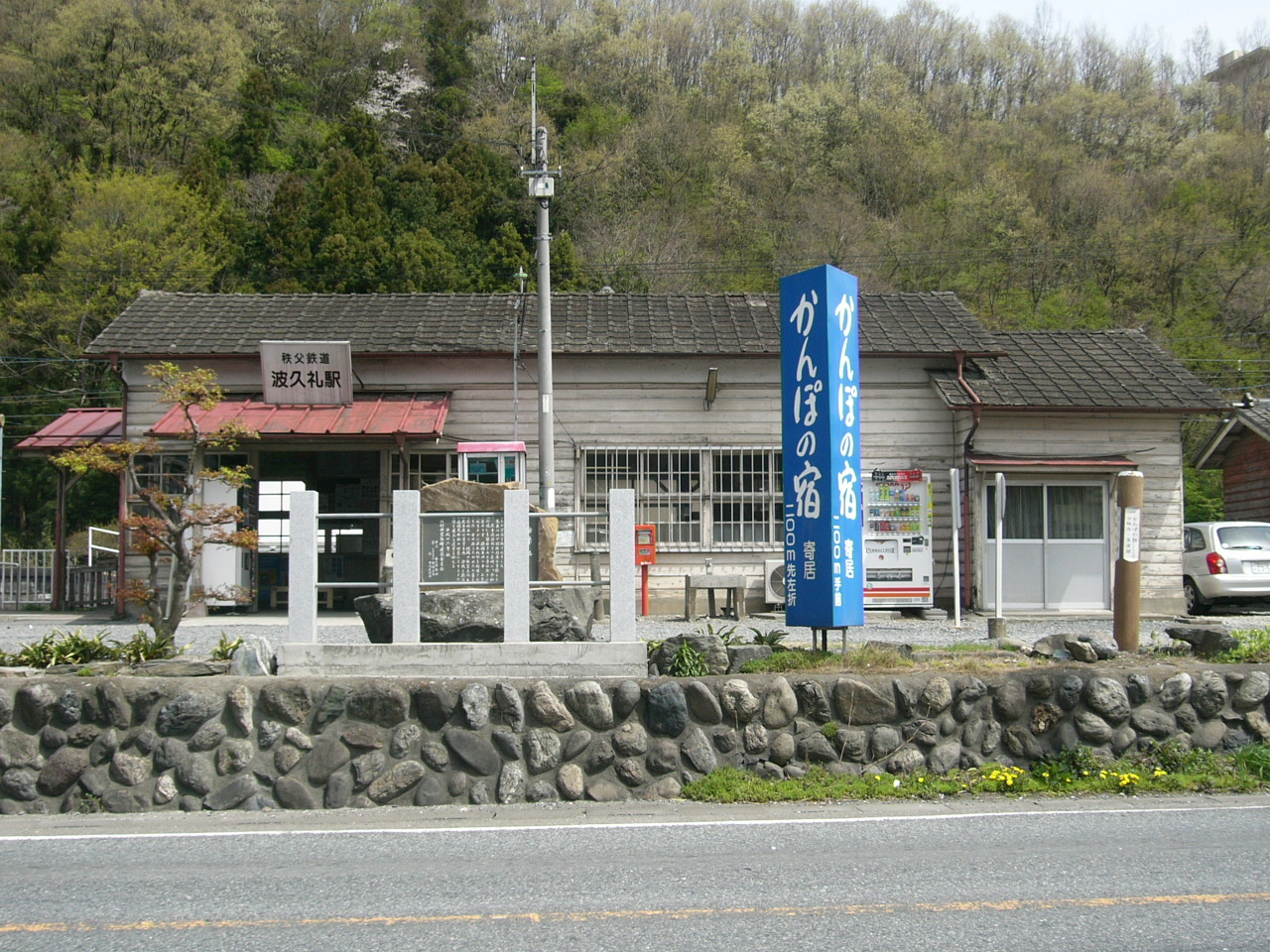
- Hagure Station, April 2006

General information
- Location: 81-1 Sueno, Yorii-mchi, Osato-gun, Saitama-ken 369-1205; Japan
- Coordinates: 36.1265°N 139.1580°E
- Operator: Chichibu Railway
- Line: ■ Chichibu Main Line
- Distance: 37.7 km from Hanyū
- Platforms: 1 island platform

Other information
- Website: Official website

History
- Opened: 1 April 1903

Passengers
- FY2018: 227 daily

Services
Preceding station	Chichibu Railway	Following station
Higuchi CR22 towards Mitsumineguchi	Chichibu Main Line Local	Yorii CR20 towards Hanyū
Location
- Location within Saitama Prefecture Location within Japan

Hagure Station (波久礼駅, Hagure-eki) is a passenger railway station in the town of Yorii, Saitama, Japan, operated by the private railway operator Chichibu Railway.

== Lines ==
Hagure Station is served by the Chichibu Main Line from Hanyū to Mitsumineguchi, and is located 37.7 km from Hanyū.

== Station layout ==
The station is staffed and consists of a single island platform serving two tracks, with an additional bidirectional track adjacent to track 2 for use by freight services.

=== Platforms ===
1	■ Chichibu Main Line	for Chichibu and Mitsumineguchi
2	■ Chichibu Main Line	for Kumagaya and Hanyū

== History ==
Hagure Station opened on 1 April 1903.

== Passenger statistics ==
In fiscal 2018, the station was used by an average of 227 passengers daily.

== Surrounding area ==
- Arakawa River
- Tamayodo Dam
- National Route 140

== See also ==
- List of railway stations in Japan
