= Wadō-Kuroya Station =

Railway station in Chichibu, Saitama Prefecture, Japan

CR28 Wadō-Kuroya Station 和銅黒谷駅
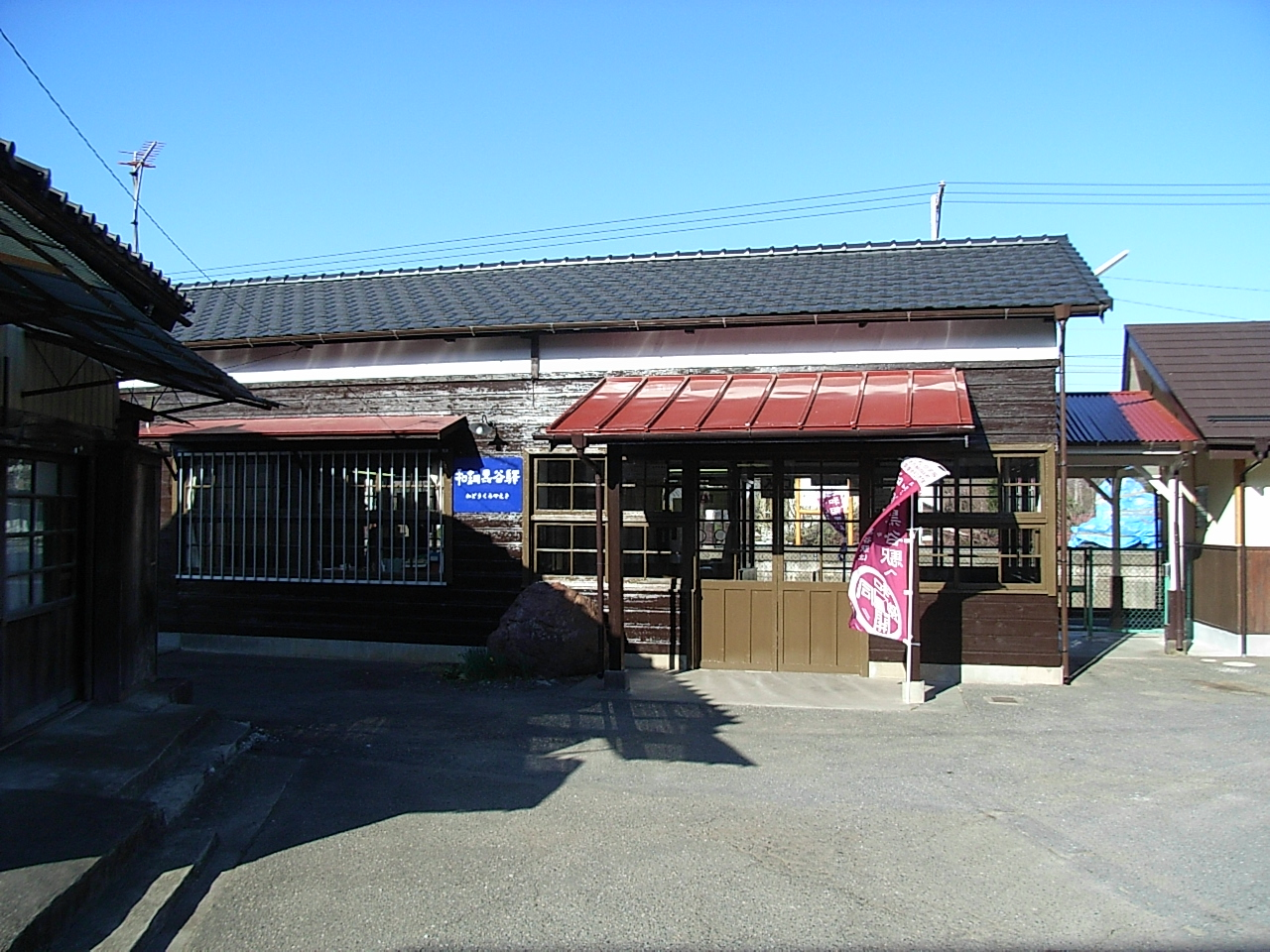
- Wadō-Kuroya Station, April 2008

General information
- Location: 412-4 Kuroya, Chichibu-shi, Saitama-ken 368-0001; Japan
- Coordinates: 36°2′48.93″N 139°6′6.63″E
- Operator: Chichibu Railway
- Line: ■ Chichibu Main Line
- Distance: 53.4 km from Hanyū
- Platforms: 1 island platform

Other information
- Status: Staffed
- Website: Official website

History
- Opened: October 27, 1914
- Former names: Kuroya (until 2008)

Passengers
- FY2018: 428 daily

Services
Preceding station	Chichibu Railway	Following station
Ōnohara CR29 towards Mitsumineguchi	Chichibu Main Line Local	Minano CR27 towards Hanyū
Location
- Location within Saitama Prefecture Location within Japan

Wadō-Kuroya Station (和銅黒谷駅, Wadō-kuroya-eki) is a passenger railway station located in the city of Chichibu, Saitama, Japan, operated by the private railway operator Chichibu Railway.

== Lines ==
Wadō-Kuroya Station is served by the Chichibu Main Line from Hanyū to Mitsumineguchi, and is located 53.4 kilometres (33.2 mi) from Hanyū.

== Station layout ==
The station is staffed and consists of a single island platform serving two tracks. An additional bidirectional loop runs alongside track 2 for use by freight services.

=== Platforms ===
1	■ Chichibu Main Line	for Chichibu, Mitsumineguchi, Hannō, and Ikebukuro (through services via Seibu Chichibu Line)
2	■ Chichibu Main Line	for Yorii, Kumagaya and Hanyū

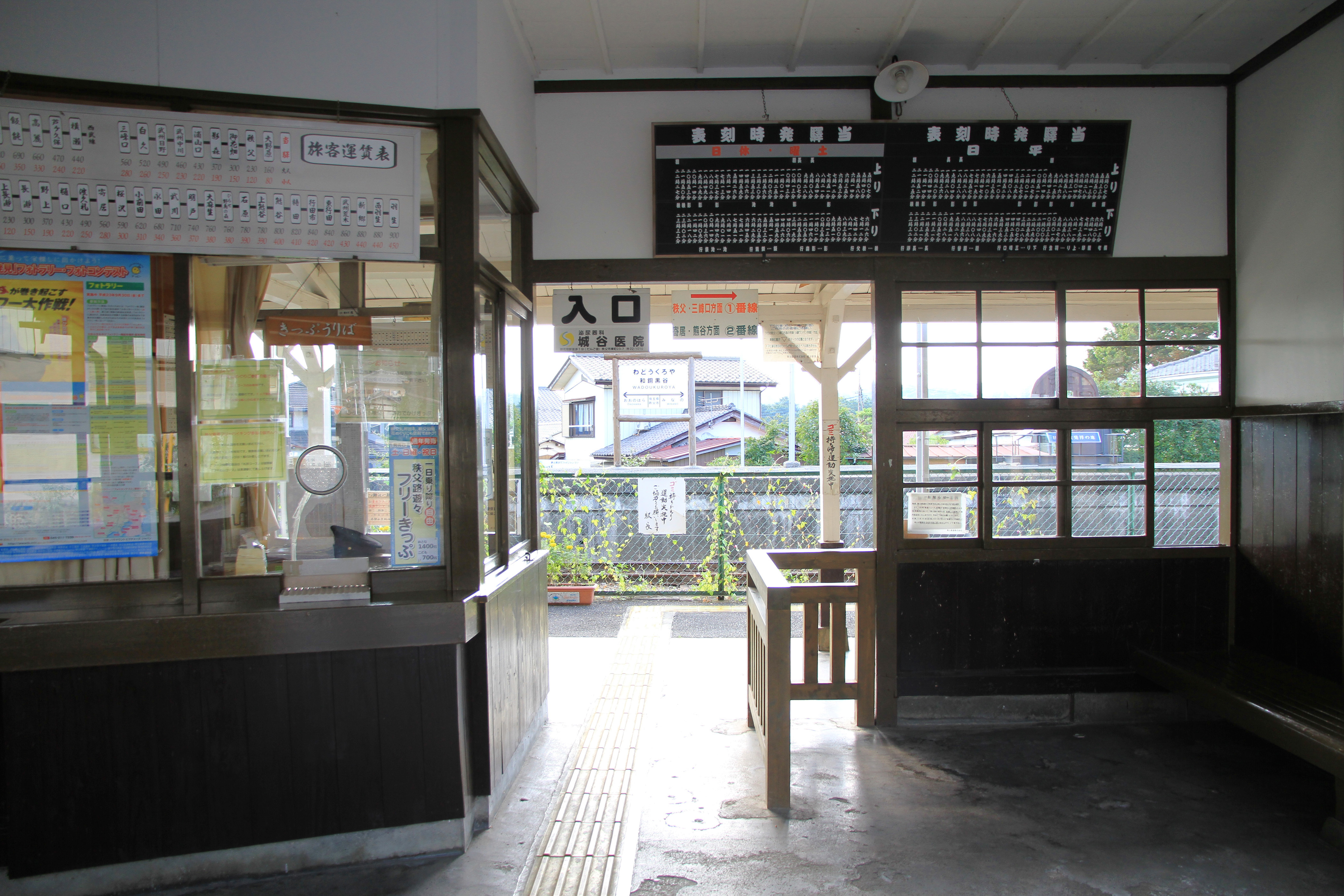
Station entrance and ticket office, September 2011

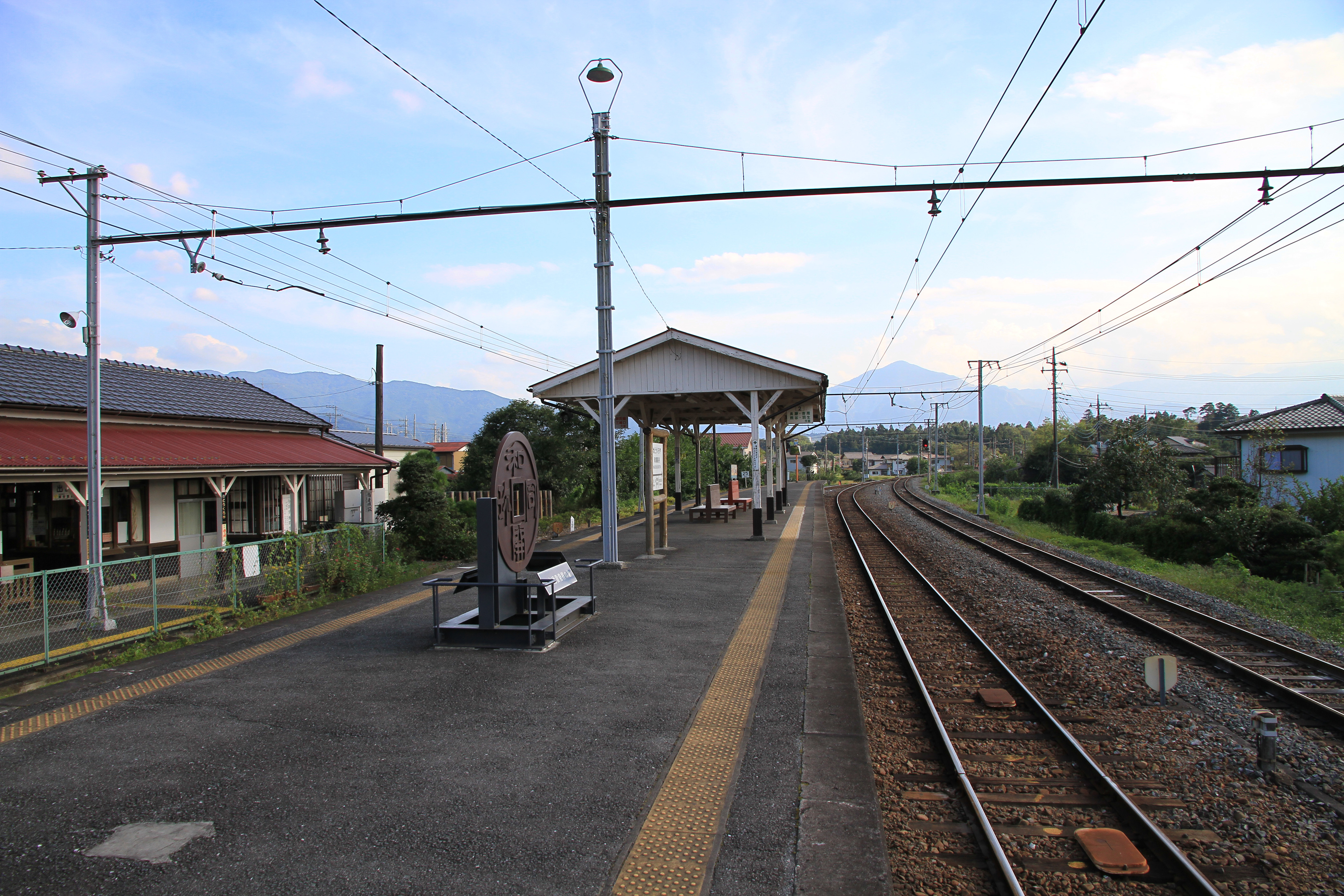
The platforms, September 2011

== History ==
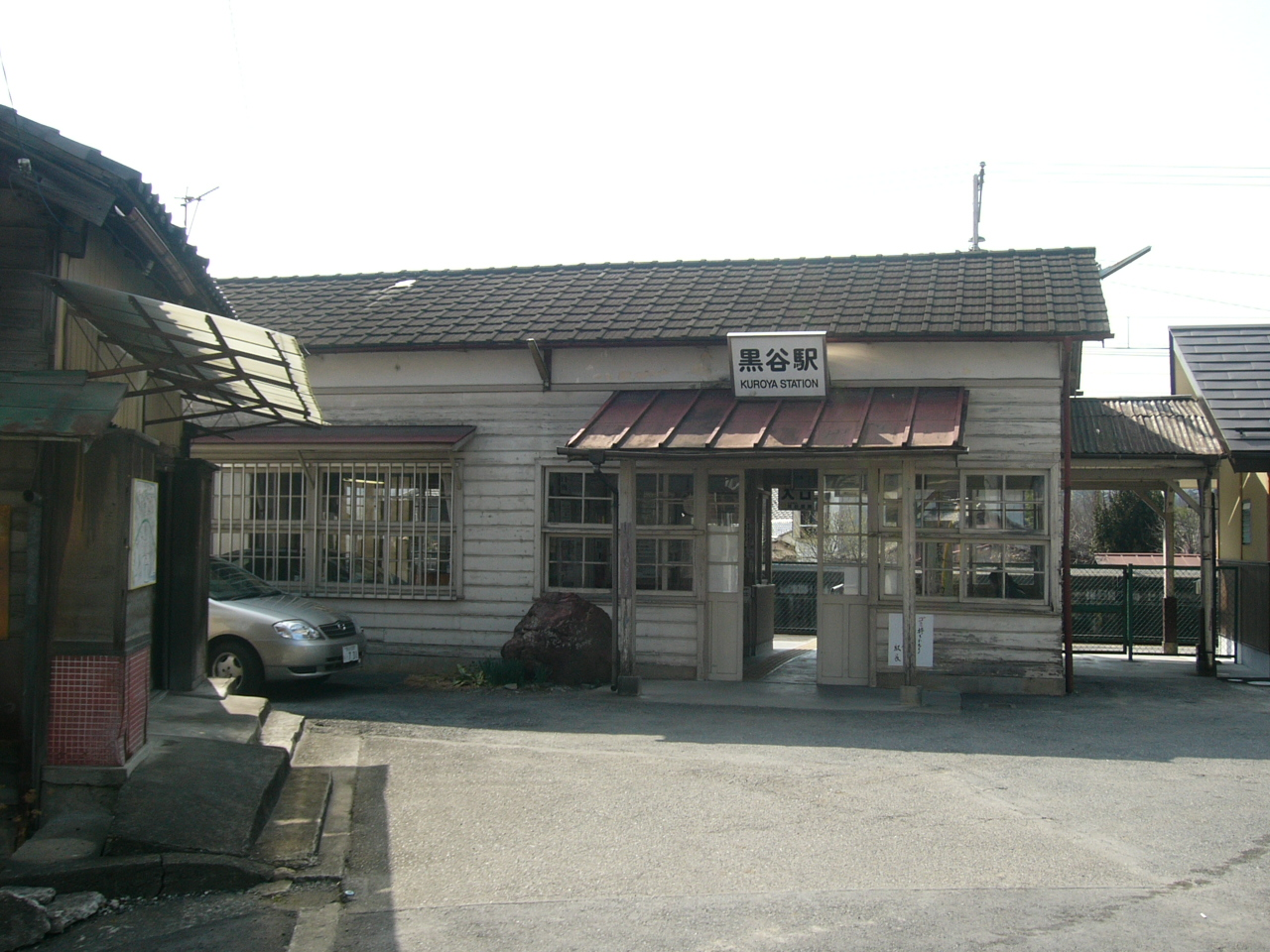
Kuroya Station in May 2006

The station opened as Kuroya Station on October 27, 1914. The station name was changed to Wadō-Kuroya Station from April 1, 2008.

== Passenger statistics ==
In fiscal 2018, the station was used by an average of 428 passengers daily.

== Surrounding area ==
- Arakawa River
- National Route 140
- Hijiri Shrine

== See also ==
- List of railway stations in Japan
