= Higuchi Station (Saitama) =

Railway station in Nagatoro, Saitama Prefecture, Japan

CR22 Higuchi Station 樋口駅
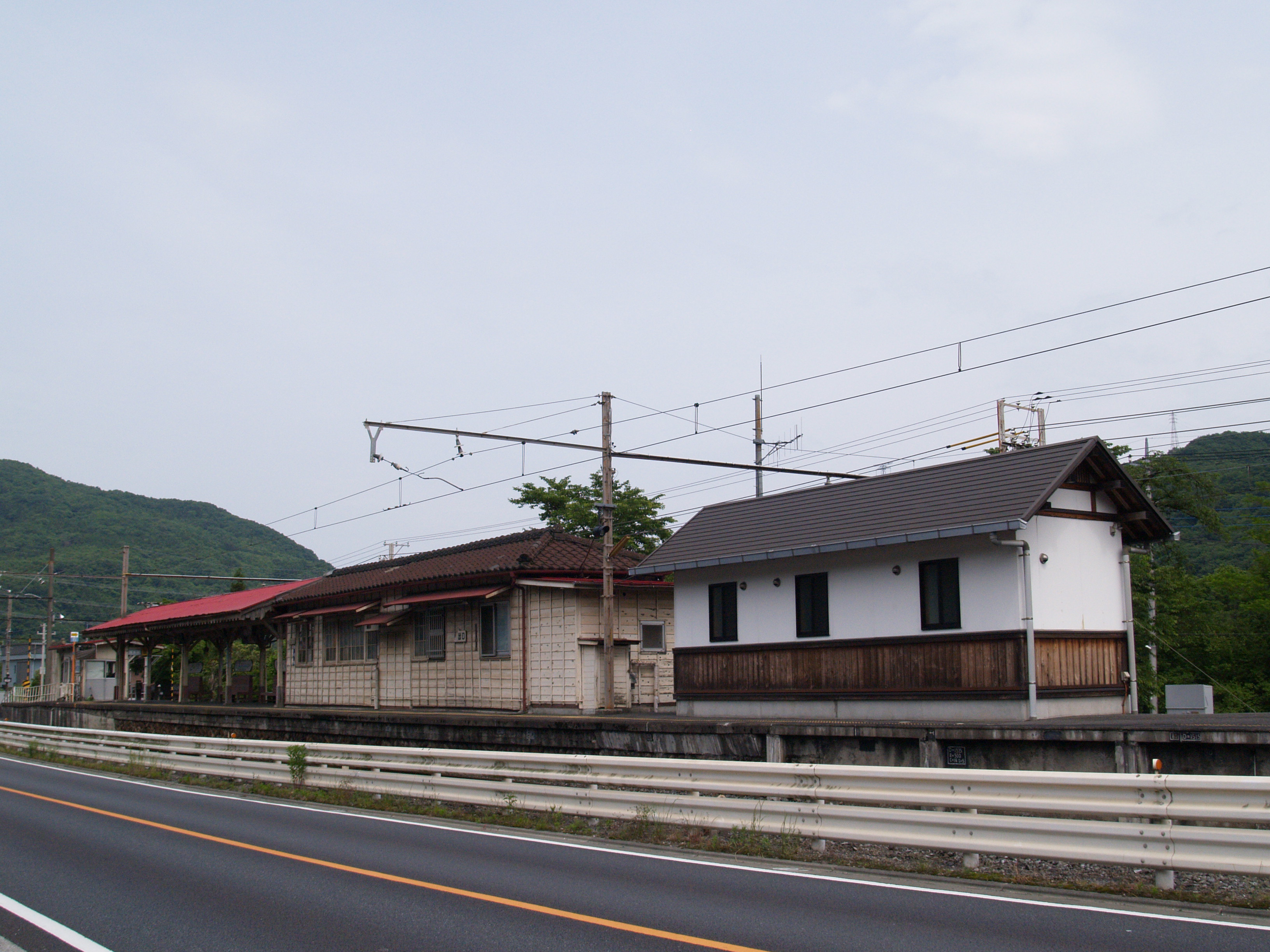
- Higuchi Station, June 2012

General information
- Location: 939-4 Nogamishimogō, Nagatoro-machi, Chichibu-gun, Saitama-ken 369-1302; Japan
- Coordinates: 36°7′51.77″N 139°7′19.85″E
- Operator: Chichibu Railway
- Line: ■ Chichibu Main Line
- Distance: 42.1 km from Hanyū
- Platforms: 1 island platform

Other information
- Website: Official website

History
- Opened: 14 September 1911

Passengers
- FY2018: 242 daily

Services
Preceding station	Chichibu Railway	Following station
Nogami CR23 towards Mitsumineguchi	Chichibu Main Line Local	Hagure CR21 towards Hanyū
Location
- Location within Saitama Prefecture Location within Japan

Higuchi Station (樋口駅, Higuchi-eki) is a passenger railway station located in the town of Nagatoro, Saitama, Japan, operated by the private railway operator Chichibu Railway.

== Lines ==
Higuchi Station is served by the Chichibu Main Line from Hanyū to Mitsumineguchi, and is located 42.1 km from Hanyū.

== Station layout ==
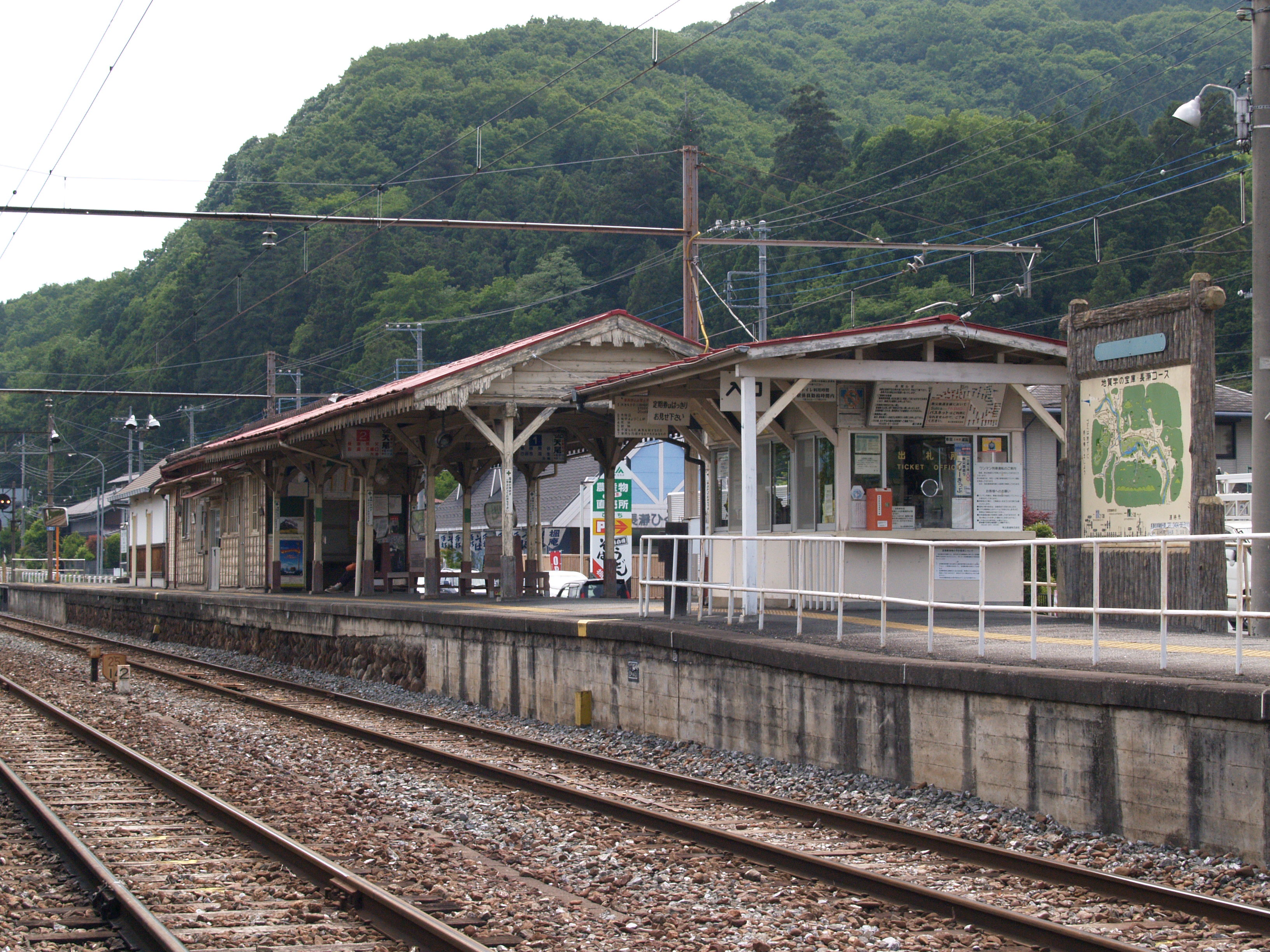
View of the platforms, June 2012

The station is staffed and consists of a single island platform serving two tracks, with an additional bidirectional track adjacent to track 2 for use by freight services.

=== Platforms ===
1	■ Chichibu Main Line	for Kumagaya and Hanyū
2	■ Chichibu Main Line	for Chichibu and Mitsumineguchi

== History ==
Higuchi Station opened on 14 September 1911.

== Passenger statistics ==
In fiscal 2018, the station was used by an average of 242 passengers daily.

== Surrounding area ==
- Arakawa River
- National Route 140
