= Nogami Station =

Railway station in Nagatoro, Saitama Prefecture, Japan

CR23 Nogami Station 野上駅
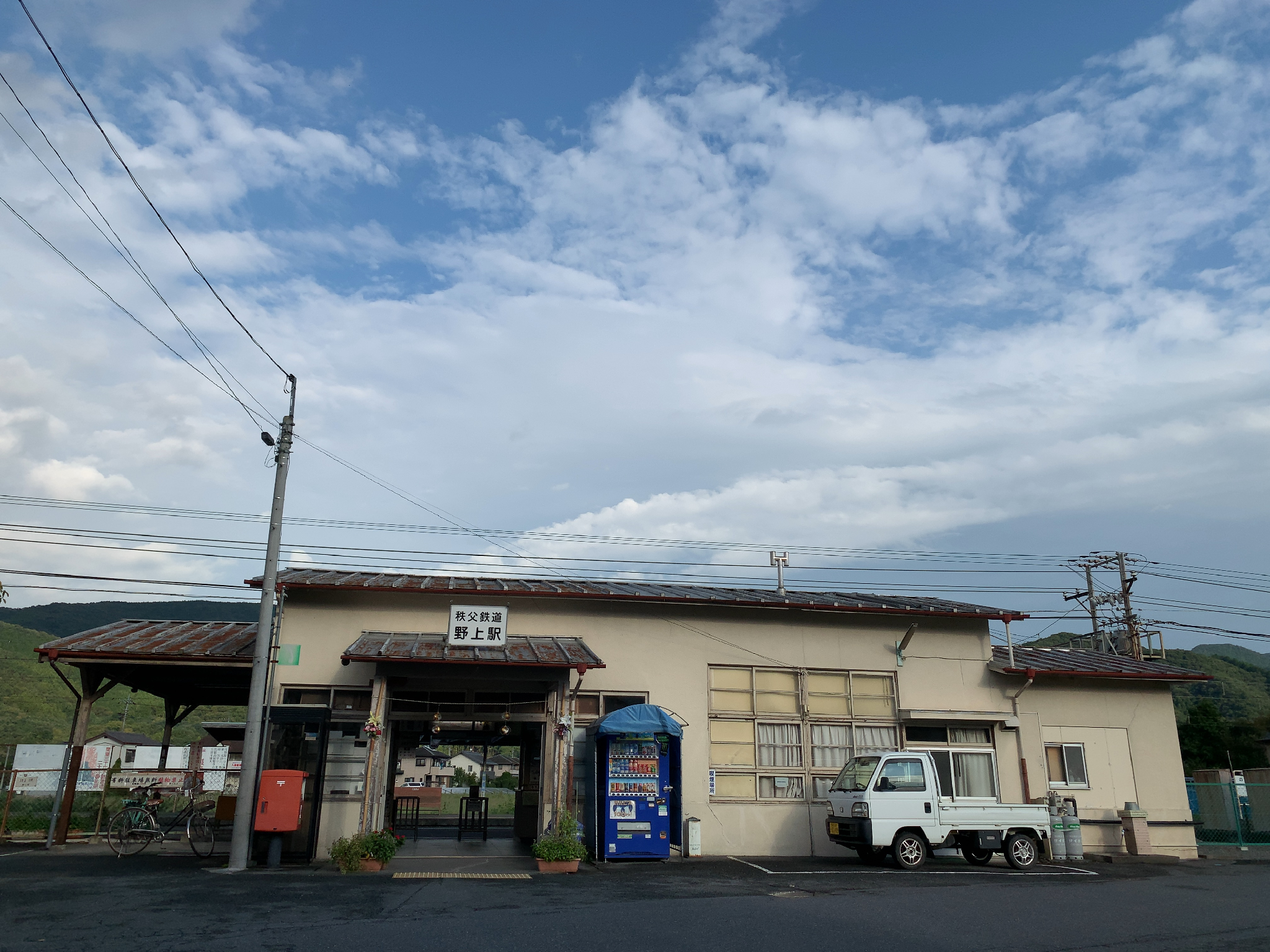
- Nogami Station, September 2019

General information
- Location: 281-3 Hon-nogami, Nagatoro-machi, Chichibu-gun, Saitama-ken 369-1304; Japan
- Coordinates: 36.1117°N 139.1107°E
- Operator: Chichibu Railway
- Line: ■ Chichibu Main Line
- Distance: 44.7 km from Hanyū
- Platforms: 1 side + 1 island platform

Other information
- Website: Official website

History
- Opened: 14 September 1911
- Former names: Hon-Nogami (until 1929)

Passengers
- FY2018: 649 daily

Services
Preceding station	Chichibu Railway	Following station
Nagatoro CR24 towards Mitsumineguchi	Chichibu Main Line Rapid Chichibuji	Yorii CR20 towards Hanyū
Nagatoro CR24 towards Mitsumineguchi	Chichibu Main Line Local	Higuchi CR22 towards Hanyū
Location
- Location within Saitama Prefecture Location within Japan

Nogami Station (野上駅, Nogami-eki) is a passenger railway station located in the town of Nagatoro, Saitama, Japan, operated by the private railway operator Chichibu Railway.

== Lines ==
Nogami Station is served by the Chichibu Main Line from Hanyū to Mitsumineguchi, and is located 44.7 km from Hanyū.

== Station layout ==
The station is staffed and consists of one side platform and one island platform serving three tracks in total. Track 3 is a bidirectional line used by freight services.

=== Platforms ===
1	■ Chichibu Main Line	for Kumagaya and Hanyū
2	■ Chichibu Main Line	for Chichibu and Mitsumineguchi
3	■ Chichibu Main Line	for freight only

== History ==
Nogami Station opened on 14 September 1911, initially as Hon-Nogami Station (本野上駅). The station was renamed Nogami on 16 December 1929.

== Passenger statistics ==
In fiscal 2018, the station was used by an average of 649 passengers daily.

== Surrounding area ==
- Nagatoro Town Office
- Ara River
- National Route 140
