= Oyahana Station =

Railway station in Minano, Saitama Prefecture, Japan

CR26 Oyahana Station 親鼻駅
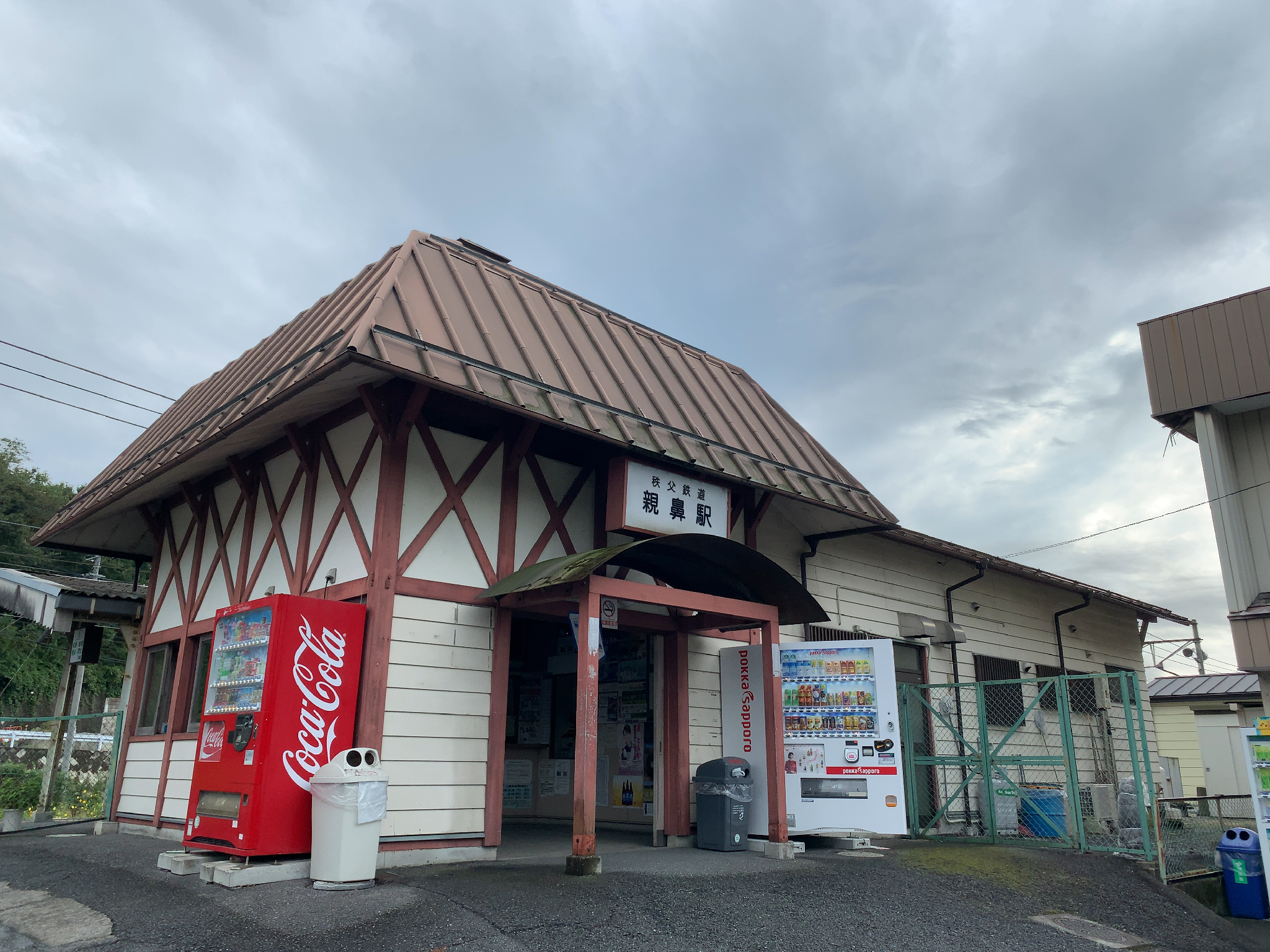
- Oyahana Station, September 2019

General information
- Location: 2499-2 Minano, Minano-machi, Chichibu-gun, Saitama-ken 369-1412; Japan
- Coordinates: 36°04′40″N 139°06′21″E
- Operator: Chichibu Railway
- Line: ■ Chichibu Main Line
- Distance: 49.2 km from Hanyū
- Platforms: 1 side + 1 island platform

Other information
- Website: Official website

History
- Opened: 27 October 1914

Passengers
- FY2018: 395 daily

Services
Preceding station	Chichibu Railway	Following station
Minano CR27 towards Mitsumineguchi	Chichibu Main Line Local	Kami-Nagatoro CR25 towards Hanyū
Location
- Location within Saitama Prefecture Location within Japan

Oyahana Station (親鼻駅, Oyahana-eki) is a passenger railway station located in the town of Minano, Saitama, Japan, operated by the private railway operator Chichibu Railway.

== Lines ==
Oyahana Station is served by the Chichibu Main Line from Hanyū to Mitsumineguchi, and is located 49.2 km from Hanyū.

== Station layout ==
The station is staffed and consists of one side platform and one island platform serving three tracks in total. Track 3 is a bidirectional line normally used by freight services only.

=== Platforms ===
1	■ Chichibu Main Line	for Yorii, Kumagaya and Hanyū
2	■ Chichibu Main Line	for Chichibu, Mitsumineguchi, Hannō, and Ikebukuro (through services via Seibu Chichibu Line)
3	■ Chichibu Main Line	for freight services only

== History ==
Oyahana Station opened on 27 October 1914.

== Passenger statistics ==
In fiscal 2018, the station was used by an average of 395 passengers daily.

== Surrounding area ==
- Arakawa River
- National Route 140

== See also ==
- List of railway stations in Japan
