= Kami-Nagatoro Station =

Railway station in Nagatoro, Saitama Prefecture, Japan

CR25 Kami-Nagatoro Station 上長瀞駅
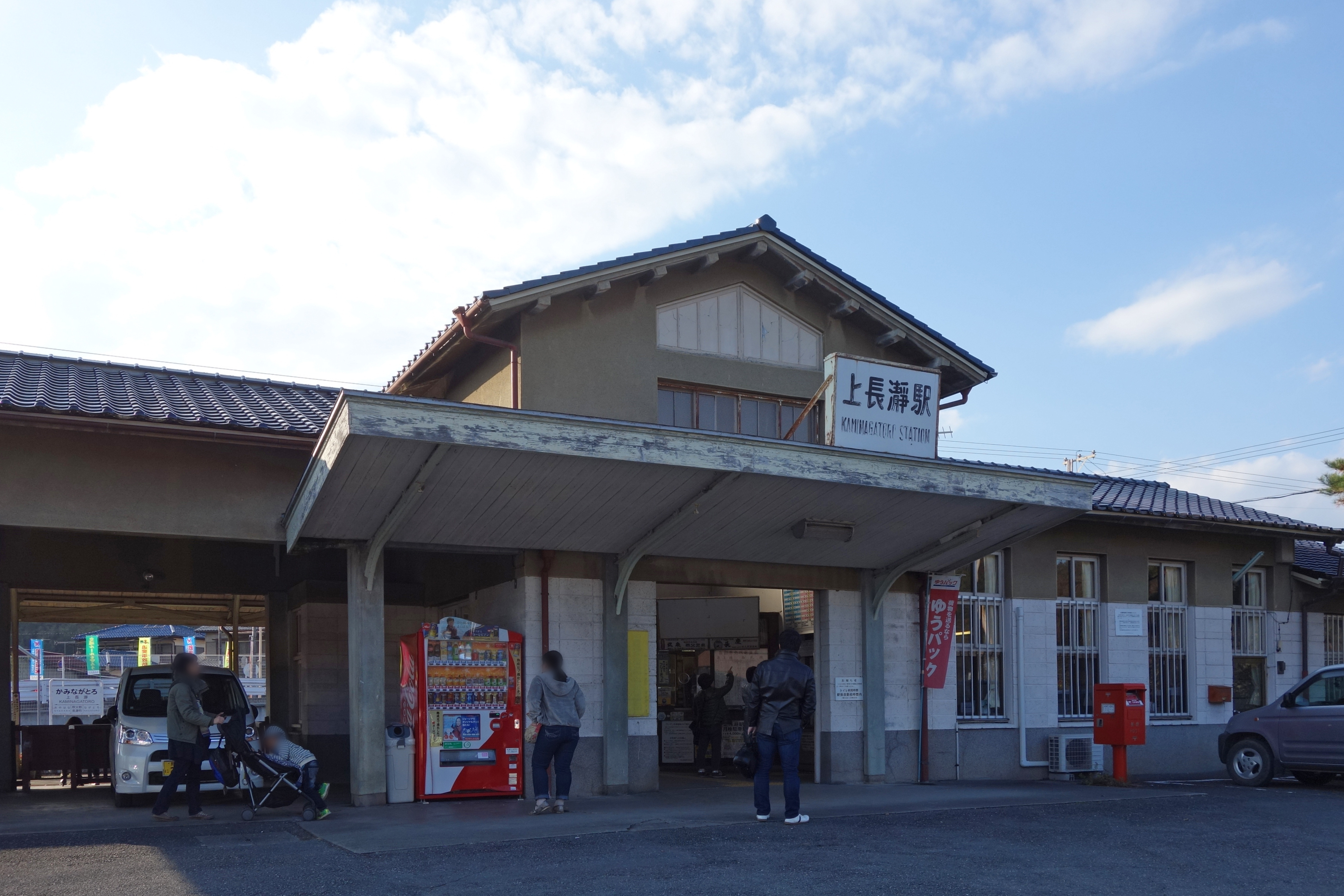
- Kami-Nagatoro Station in November 2013

General information
- Location: 1524-1 Nagatoro, Nagatoro-machi, Chichibu-gun, Saitama-ken 369-1305; Japan
- Coordinates: 36°05′10″N 139°06′48″E
- Operator: Chichibu Railway
- Line: ■ Chichibu Main Line
- Distance: 47.6 km from Hanyū
- Platforms: 1 side + 1 island platform
- Tracks: 3

Other information
- Website: Official website

History
- Opened: 29 December 1915
- Former names: Kunikami (until 1928)

Passengers
- FY2018: 263 daily

Services
Preceding station	Chichibu Railway	Following station
Oyahana CR26 towards Mitsumineguchi	Chichibu Main Line Local	Nagatoro CR24 towards Hanyū
Location
- Location within Saitama Prefecture Location within Japan

Kami-Nagatoro Station (上長瀞駅, Kami-Nagatoro-eki) is a passenger railway station located in the town of Minano, Saitama, Japan, operated by the private railway operator Chichibu Railway.

== Lines ==
Kami-Nagatoro Station is served by the 71.7 km Chichibu Main Line from Hanyū to Mitsumineguchi, and is located 47.6 km from Hanyū.

== Station layout ==
The station is staffed and consists of one side platform and one island platform serving three tracks in total. Track 3 is a bidirectional line normally used by freight services only.

=== Platforms ===
1	■ Chichibu Main Line	for Chichibu Mitsumineguchi, Hannō, and Ikebukuro (through services via Seibu Chichibu Line)
2	■ Chichibu Main Line	for Yorii, Kumagaya, and Hanyū

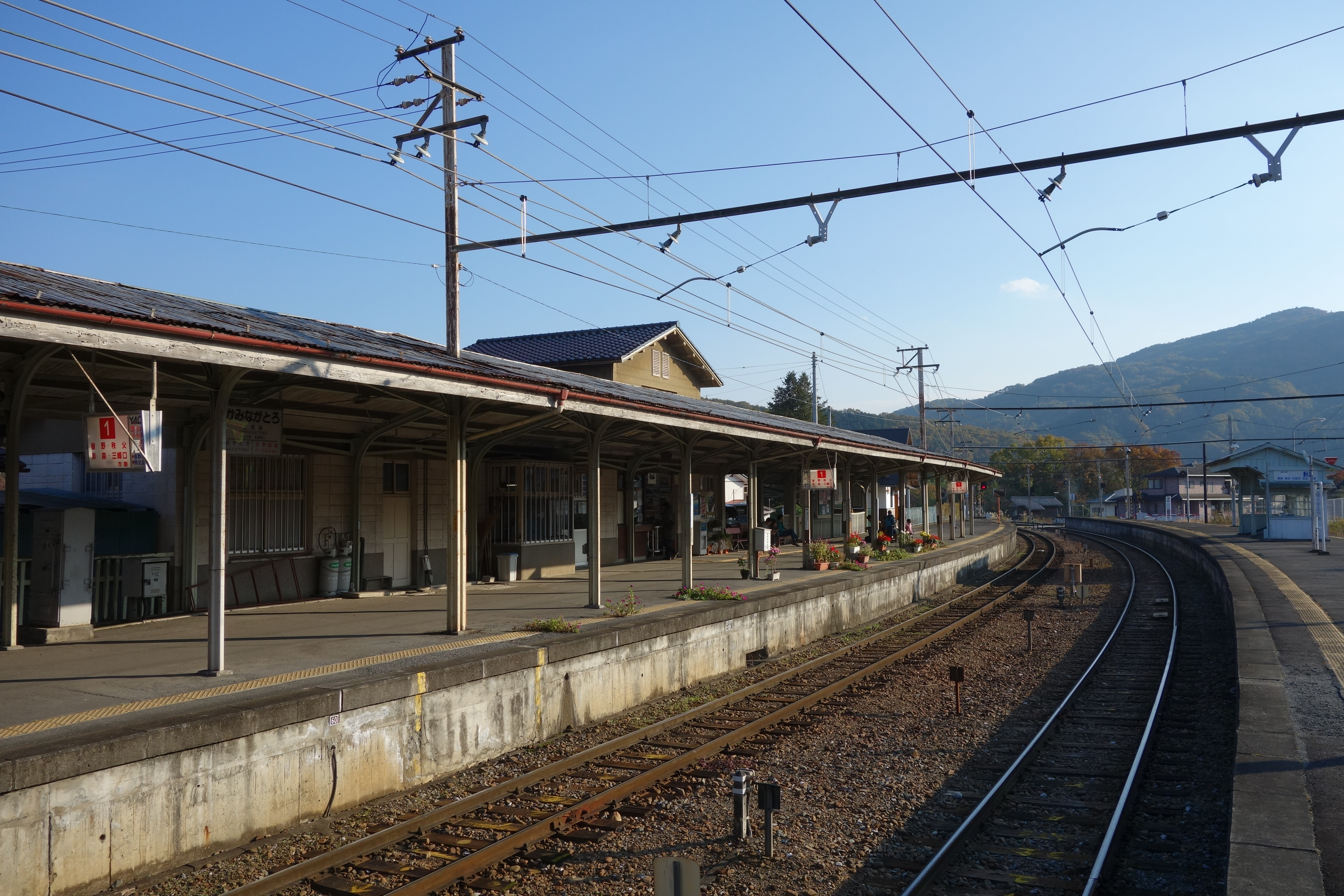
The platforms looking west in November 2013

== History ==
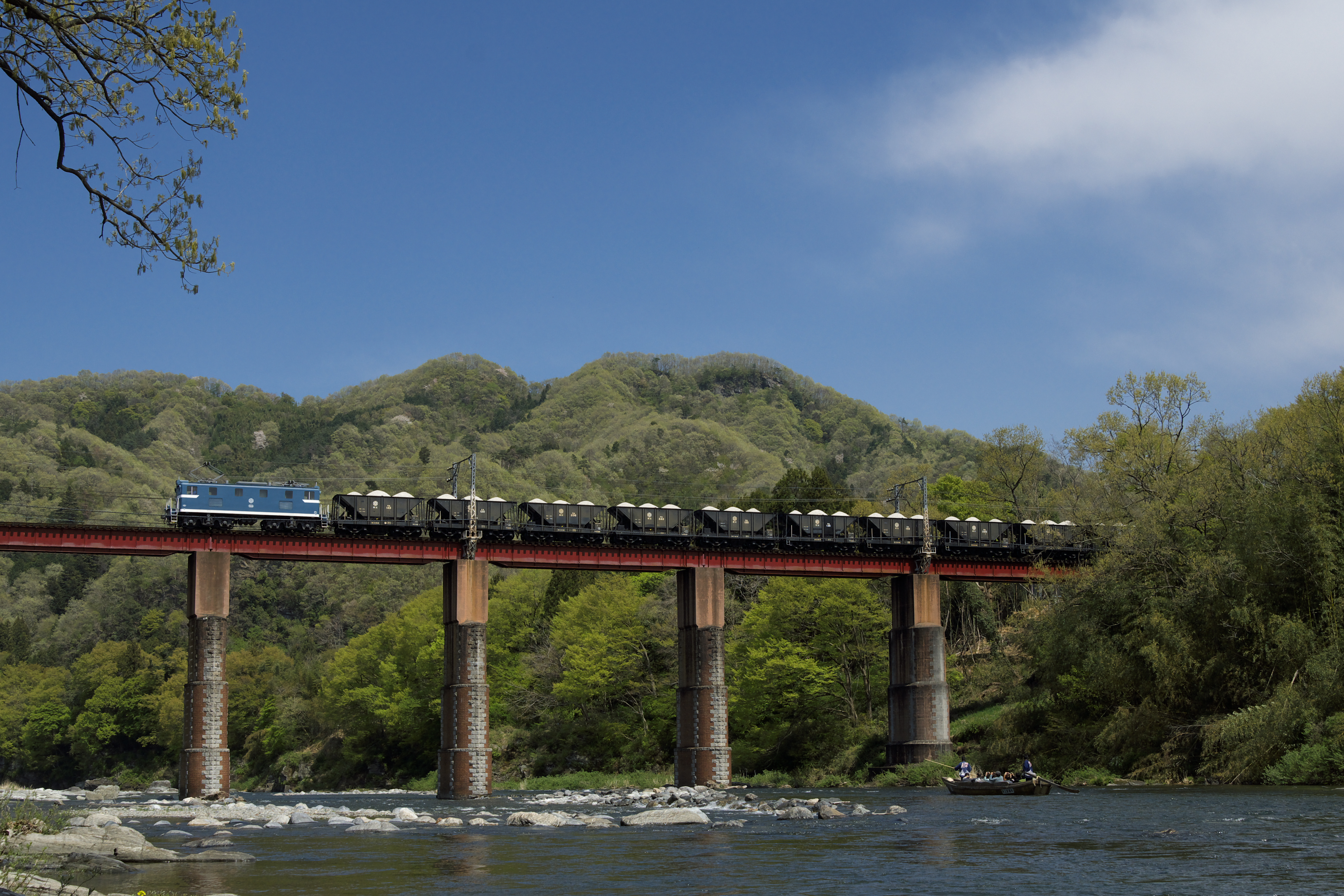
A limestone freight train crossing the Oyahana Viaduct over the Arakawa River near Kami-Nagatoro Station in April 2011

The station opened on 29 December 1915, initially as Kunikami Station (国神駅). The station was renamed Kami-Nagatoro from 15 May 1928.

== Passenger statistics ==
In fiscal 2018, the station was used by an average of 263 passengers daily.

== Surrounding area ==
- Arakawa River
- National Route 140
- Saitama Prefectural Natural History Museum

== See also ==
- List of railway stations in Japan
