= Nagatoro Station =

Railway station in Nagatoro, Saitama Prefecture, Japan

CR24 Nagatoro Station 長瀞駅
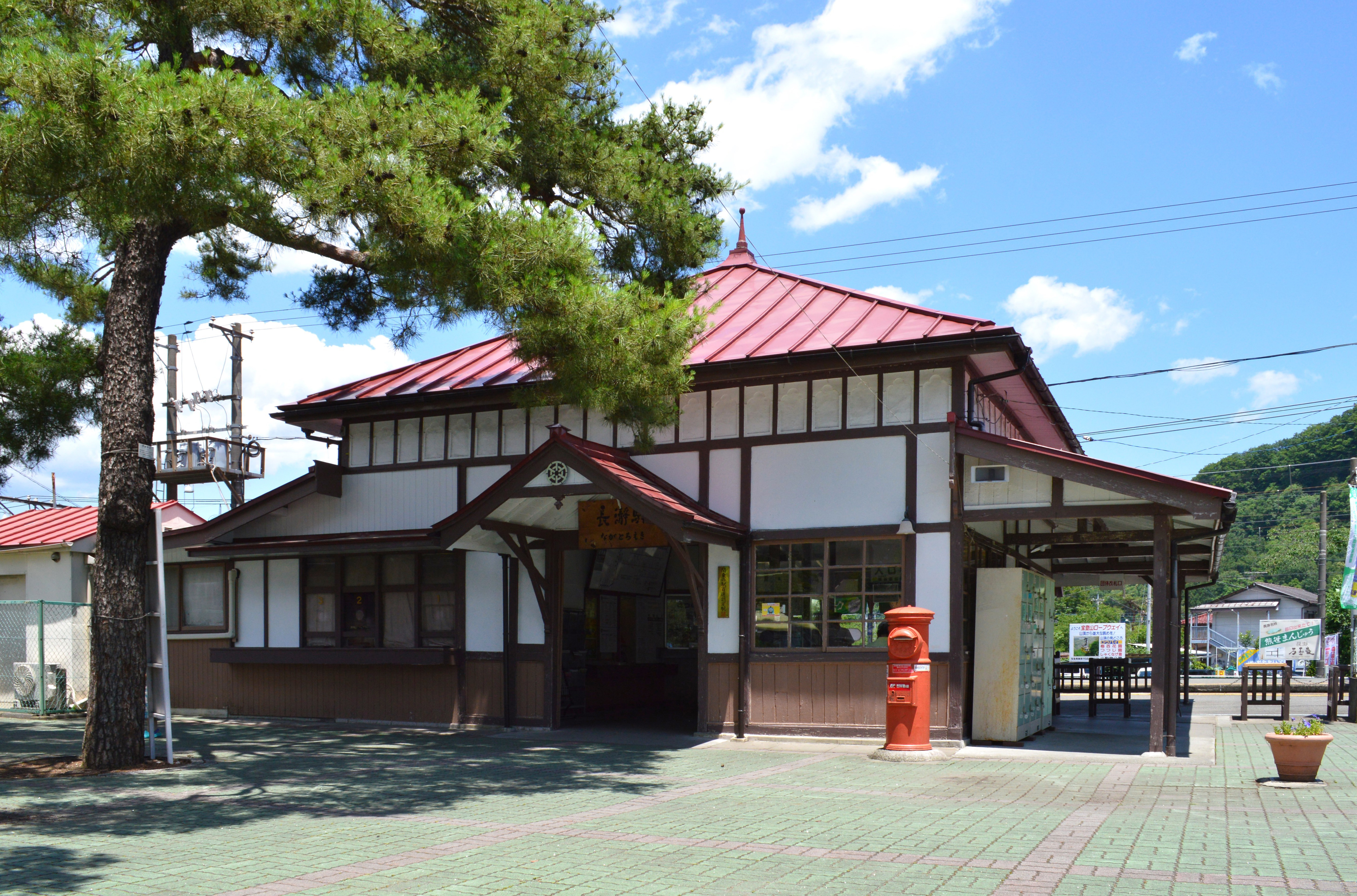
- Nagatoro Station, June 2014

General information
- Location: 529-2 Nagatoro, Nagatoro-machi, Chichibu-gen, Saitama-ken 369-1305; Japan
- Coordinates: 36°5′42.73″N 139°6′44.29″E
- Operator: Chichibu Railway
- Line: ■ Chichibu Main Line
- Distance: 46.5 km from Hanyū
- Platforms: 1 side + 1 island platform
- Tracks: 3

Other information
- Website: Official website

History
- Opened: 14 September 1911
- Former names: Hodosan (until 1923)

Passengers
- FY2018: 1,320 daily

Services
Preceding station	Chichibu Railway	Following station
Minano CR27 towards Mitsumineguchi	SL Paleo Express	Yorii CR20 towards Kumagaya
Minano CR27 towards Mitsumineguchi	Chichibu Main Line Rapid Chichibuji	Nogami CR23 towards Hanyū
Kami-Nagatoro CR25 towards Mitsumineguchi	Chichibu Main Line Local	Nogami CR23 towards Hanyū
Location
- Location within Saitama Prefecture Location within Japan

Nagatoro Station (長瀞駅, Nagatoro-eki) is a passenger railway station located in the town of Nagatoro, Saitama, Japan, operated by the private railway operator Chichibu Railway.

== Lines ==
Nagatoro Station is served by the Chichibu Main Line from Hanyū to Mitsumineguchi, and is located 46.5 km from Hanyū.

== Station layout ==
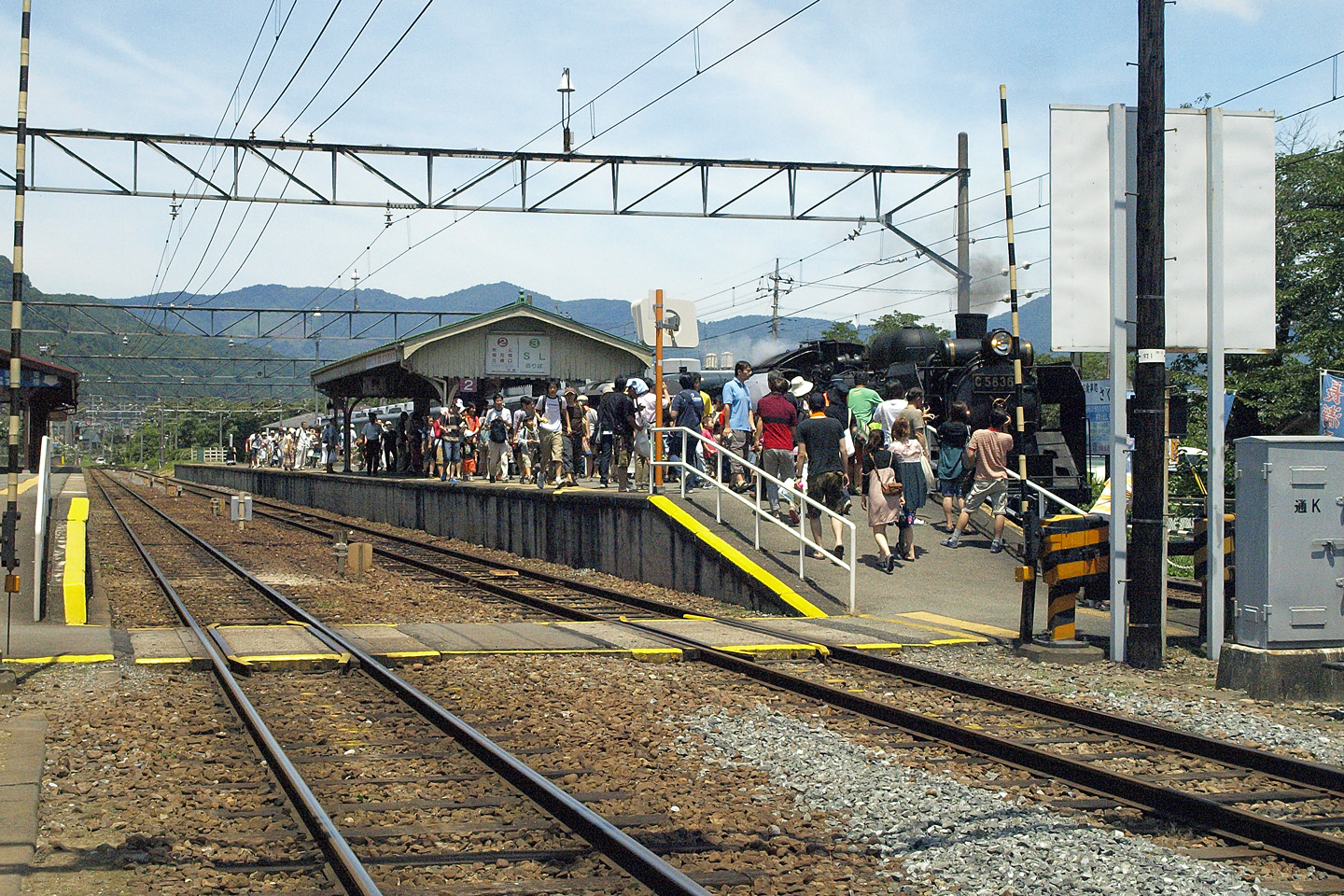
A steam-hauled Paleo Express service at Nagatoro Station, July 2010

The station is staffed and consists of one side platform and one island platform serving three tracks in total. Track 3 is a bidirectional line used by the Paleo Express, freight services, and through-running services to and from the Seibu Chichibu Line.

=== Platforms ===
1	Chichibu Main Line	for Yorii, Kumagaya, and Hanyū
2	Chichibu Main Line	for Chichibu and Mitsumineguchi
3	Chichibu Main Line	for Chichibu; Seibu Chichibu Line for Hannō

== History ==
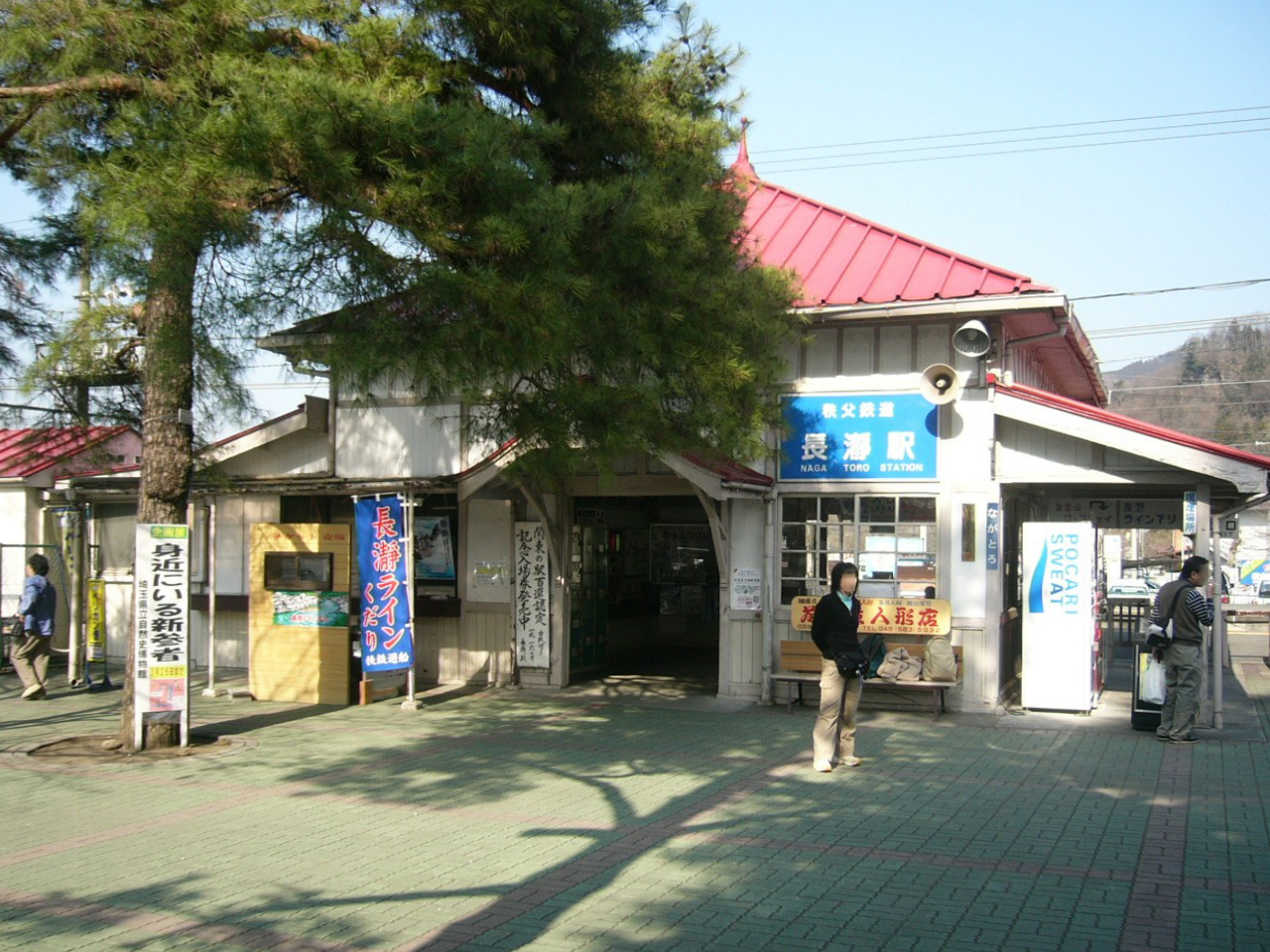
Nagatoro Station in May 2006, before renovation

The station opened on September 14, 1911 as Hodosan Station (宝登山). It was renamed Nagatoro from 7 July 1923.

== Passenger statistics ==
In fiscal 2018, the station was used by an average of 1320 passengers daily.

== Surrounding area ==
- Mount Hodosan
- Arakawa River and Nagatoro Gorge
- National Route 140

== See also ==
- List of railway stations in Japan
