= Nagatoro =

Nagatoro 長瀞町
- Town
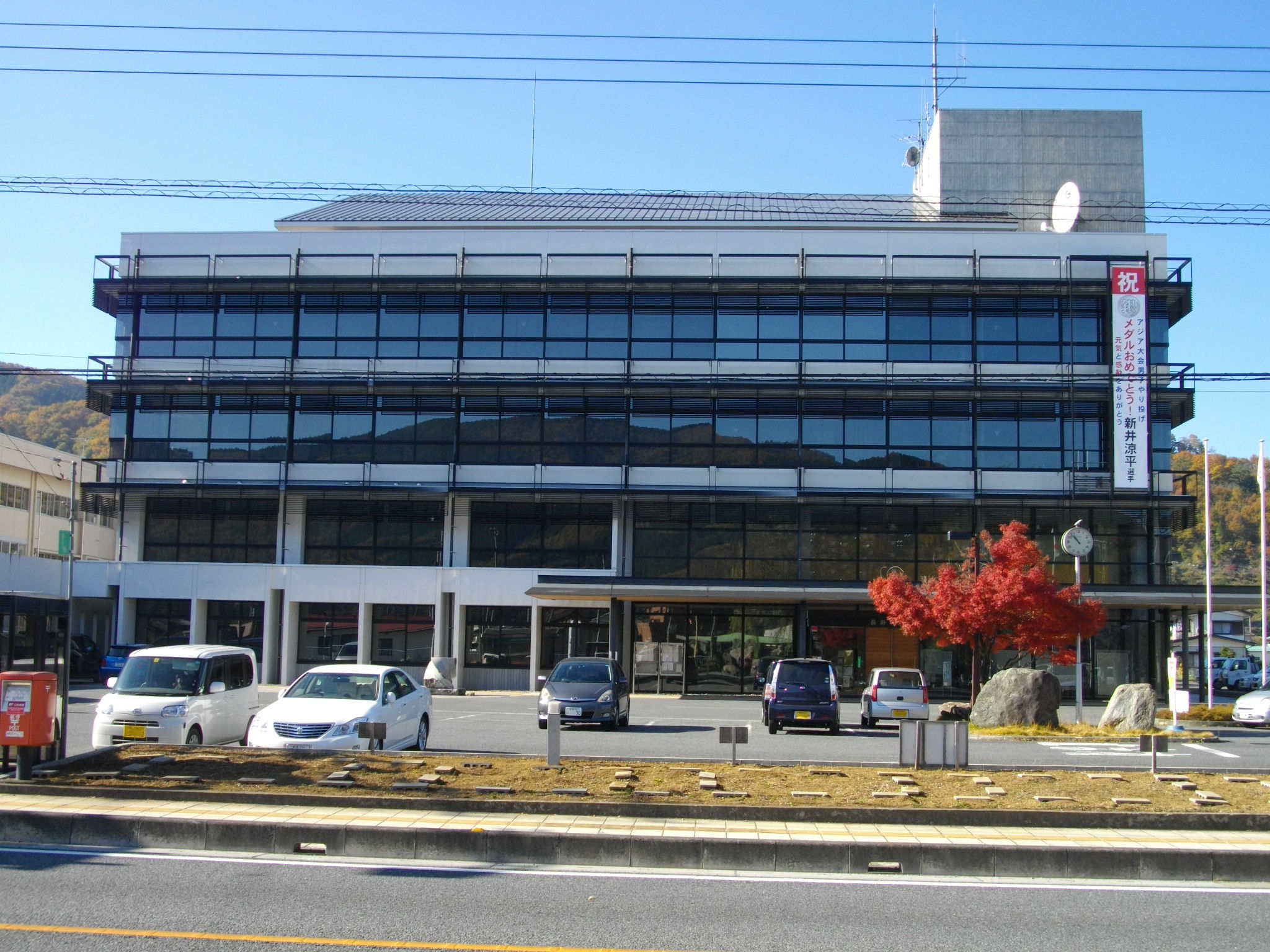
- Nagatoro town office

- Flag Seal

- Location of Nagatoro in Saitama Prefecture

- Coordinates: 36°6′53.3″N 139°6′35″E
- Country: Japan
- Region: Kantō
- Prefecture: Saitama
- District: Chichibu

Area
  - Total: 30.43 km^{2} (11.75 sq mi)

Population (March 2021)
  - Total: 6,838
  - Density: 224.7/km^{2} (582.0/sq mi)
- Time zone: UTC+9 (Japan Standard Time)
- Tree: Acer
- Flower: Sakura
- Bird: Wagtail
- Phone number: 0494-66-3111
- Address: Oji-Honnogami 1035-1, Nagatoro-cho, Chichibu-gun, Saitama-ken 369-1392
- Website: Official website

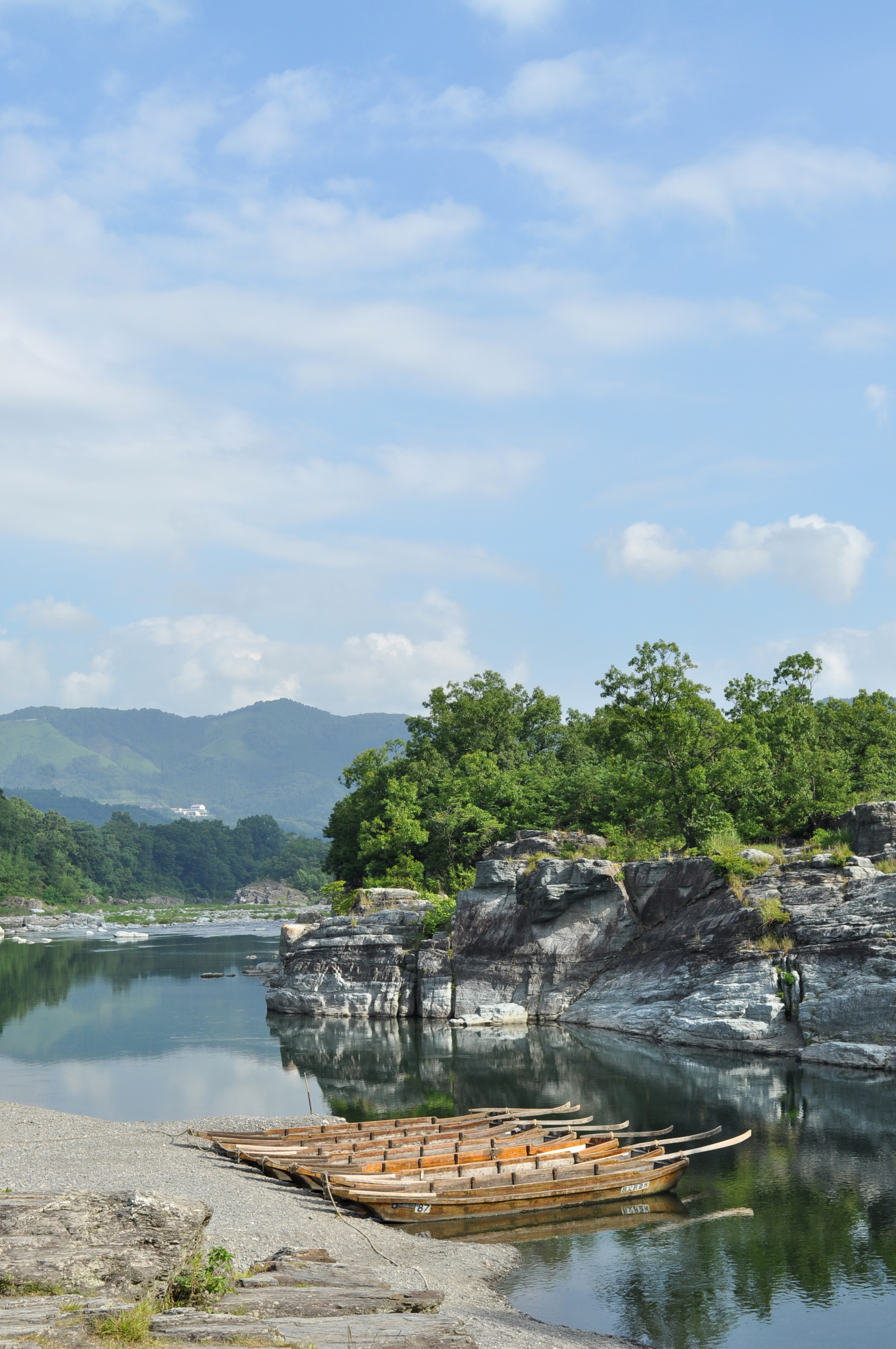
Nagatoro Gorge

Nagatoro (長瀞町, Nagatoro-machi) is a town located in Saitama Prefecture, Japan. As of 1 March 2021, the town had an estimated population of 6,838 in 2894 households and a population density of 220 persons per km^{2}. The total area of the town is 30.43 square kilometres (11.75 sq mi). The Nagatoro River is well known for its rapids and whitewater rafting and boating, and the entire town is designated as a prefectural nature park and preserve.

== Geography ==
Located in the mountains of western Saitama Prefecture, Nagatoro is on the upper reaches of the Arakawa River.

=== Surrounding municipalities ===
- Saitama Prefecture
  - Honjō
  - Minano
  - Misato
  - Yorii

=== Climate ===
Nagatoro has a humid continental climate (Köppen Cfa) characterized by warm summers and cool winters with light snowfall. The average annual temperature in Nagatoro is 12.8 °C. The average annual rainfall is 2222 mm with September as the wettest month. The temperatures are highest on average in August, at around 24.1 °C, and lowest in January, at around 1.6 °C.

== Demographics ==
Per Japanese census data, the population of Nagatoro has declined modestly in recent decades.

Historical population
Year	Pop.	±%
1950	8,896	—
1960	8,072	−9.3%
1970	8,275	+2.5%
1980	8,908	+7.6%
1990	8,906	−0.0%
2000	8,560	−3.9%
2010	7,910	−7.6%
2020	6,807	−13.9%

== History ==
The village of Nagami was created within Chichibu District, Saitama with the establishment of the modern municipalities system on April 1, 1889, and was elevated to town status on February 15, 1940. The town absorbed neighboring Higuchi and part of Shiratori villages on September 8, 1943, and changed its name to Nagatoro on November 1, 1971. In February 1955, the town expanded by annexing the neighboring villages of Orihara, Hachigata, Obusuma, and Yodo.

== Government ==
Nagatoro has a mayor-council form of government with a directly elected mayor and a unicameral town council of ten members. Nagatoro, together with the towns of Higashichichibu, Minano, Ogano and Yokoze, contributes one member to the Saitama Prefectural Assembly. In terms of national politics, the town is part of Saitama 11th district of the lower house of the Diet of Japan.

== Economy ==
The main source of income for Nagatoro is tourism-related industries.

== Education ==
Nagatoro has two public elementary schools and one public middle school operated by the town government. The town does not have a high school.

== Transportation ==
=== Railway ===
Chichibu Railway - Chichibu Main Line

- Higuchi - Nogami - Nagatoro - Kami-Nagatoro

Hodosan Ropeway

=== Highway ===
- National Route 140

== Local attractions ==
- Nagatoro Gorge
- Saitama Museum of Natural History
