= Minano Station =

Railway station in Minano, Saitama Prefecture, Japan

CR27 Minano Station 皆野駅
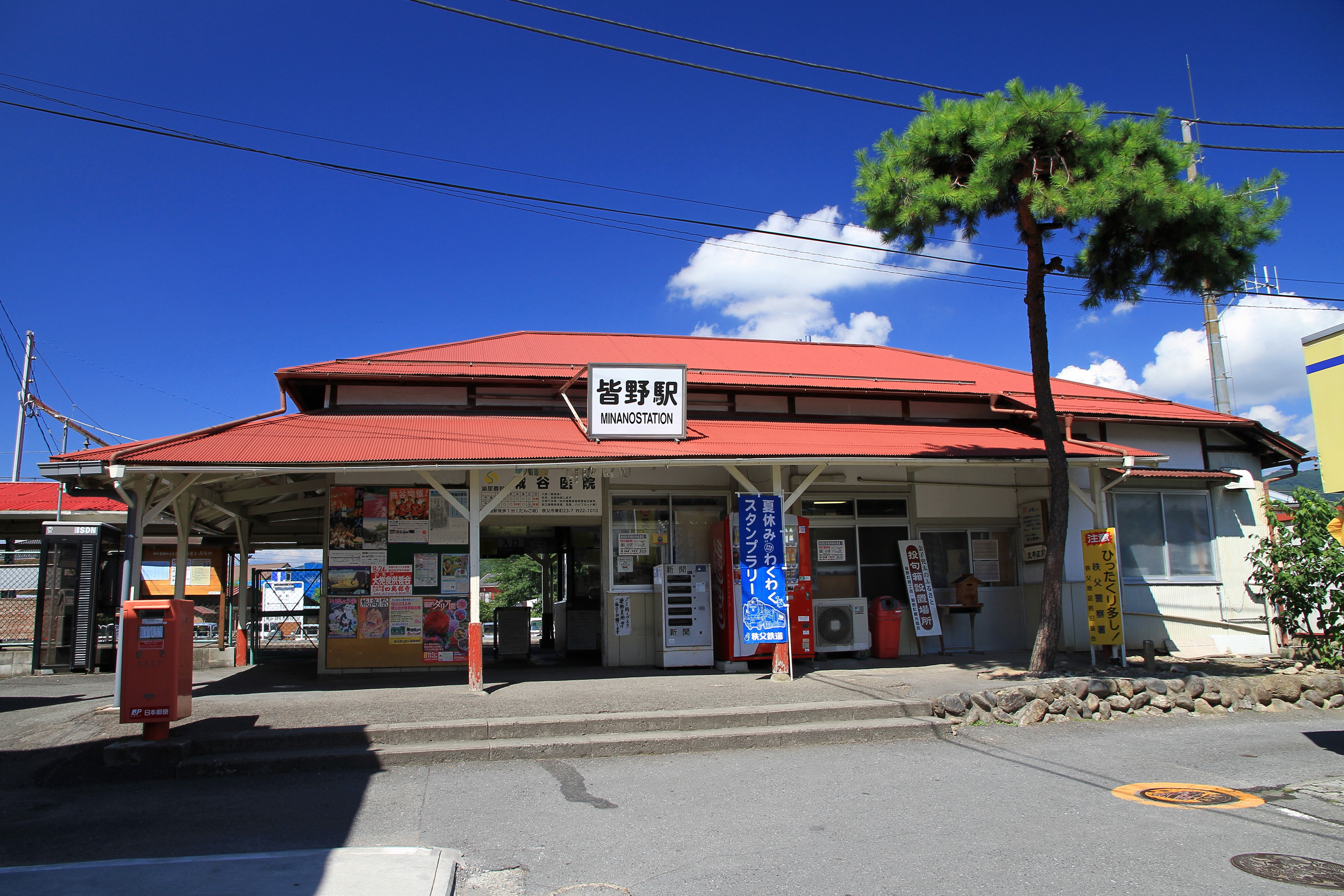
- Station entrance, August 2012

General information
- Location: 971–2 Minano, Minano-machi, Chichibu-gun, Saitama-ken 369-1412; Japan
- Coordinates: 36.0688°N 139.0942°E
- Operator: Chichibu Railway
- Line: ■ Chichibu Main Line
- Distance: 50.8 km from Hanyū
- Platforms: 1 side + 1 island platform
- Connections: Bus stop

Other information
- Website: Official website

History
- Opened: 27 October 1914

Passengers
- FY2018: 1102 daily

Services
Preceding station	Chichibu Railway	Following station
Chichibu CR30 towards Mitsumineguchi	SL Paleo Express	Nagatoro CR24 towards Kumagaya
Chichibu CR30 towards Mitsumineguchi	Chichibu Main Line Rapid Chichibuji	Nagatoro CR24 towards Hanyū
Wadō-Kuroya CR28 towards Mitsumineguchi	Chichibu Main Line Local	Oyahana CR26 towards Hanyū
Location
- Location within Saitama Prefecture Location within Japan

Minano Station (皆野駅, Minano-eki) is a passenger railway station located in the town of Minano, Saitama, Japan, operated by the private railway operator Chichibu Railway.

== Lines ==
Minano Station is served by the Chichibu Main Line from Hanyū to Mitsumineguchi, and is located 50.8 km from Hanyū.

== Station layout ==
The station is staffed and consists of one side platform and one island platform serving three tracks in total. Track 3 is a bidirectional line normally used by freight services only.

=== Platforms ===
1	■ Chichibu Main Line	for Chichibu, Mitsumineguchi, Hannō, and Ikebukuro (through services via Seibu Chichibu Line)
2	■ Chichibu Main Line	for Yorii, Kumagaya and Hanyū
3	■ Chichibu Main Line	for freight services only

== History ==
Minano Station opened on 27 October 1914.

== Passenger statistics ==
In fiscal 2018, the station was used by an average of 1102 passengers daily.

== Surrounding area ==
- Minano Town Office
- Arakawa River
- National Route 140

== See also ==
- List of railway stations in Japan
