= Ōnohara Station =

Railway station in Chichibu, Saitama Prefecture, Japan

CR29 Ōnohara Station 大野原駅
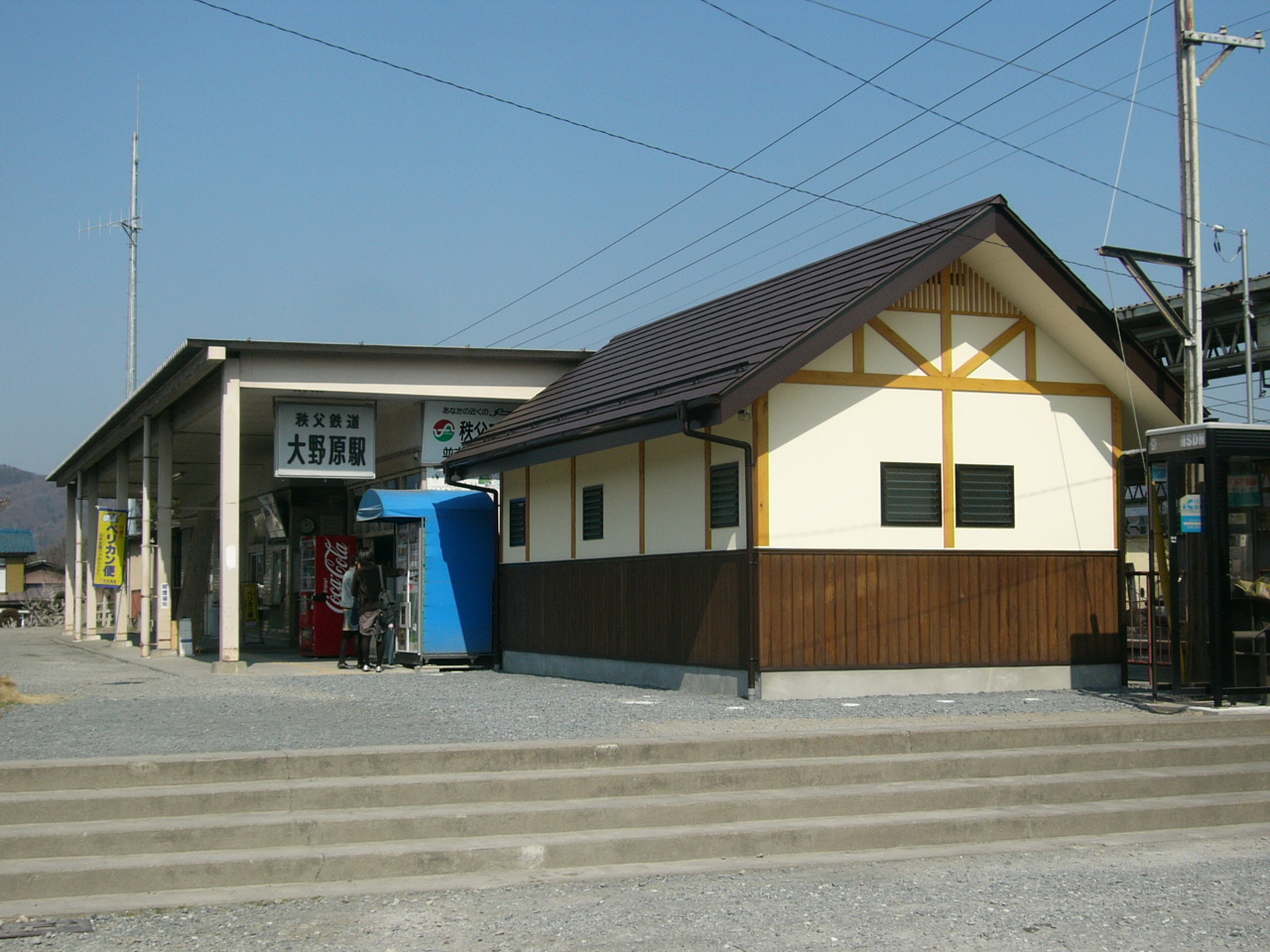
- Ōnohara Station, March 2006

General information
- Location: 306-2 Ōnohara, Chichibu-shi, Saitama-ken 368-0005; Japan
- Coordinates: 36°01′08″N 139°05′39″E
- Operator: Chichibu Railway
- Line: ■ Chichibu Main Line
- Distance: 56.6 km from Hanyū
- Platforms: 1 side + 1 island platform

Other information
- Status: Staffed
- Website: Official website

History
- Opened: 27 October 1914

Passengers
- FY2018: 1127 daily

Services
Preceding station	Chichibu Railway	Following station
Chichibu CR30 towards Mitsumineguchi	Chichibu Main Line Local	Wadō-Kuroya CR28 towards Hanyū
Location
- Location within Saitama Prefecture Location within Japan

Ōnohara Station (大野原駅, Ōnohara-eki) is a passenger railway station located in the city of Chichibu, Saitama, Japan, operated by the private railway operator Chichibu Railway.

== Lines ==
Ōnohara Station is served by the Chichibu Main Line from Hanyū to Mitsumineguchi, and is located 56.6 km from Hanyū.

== Station layout ==
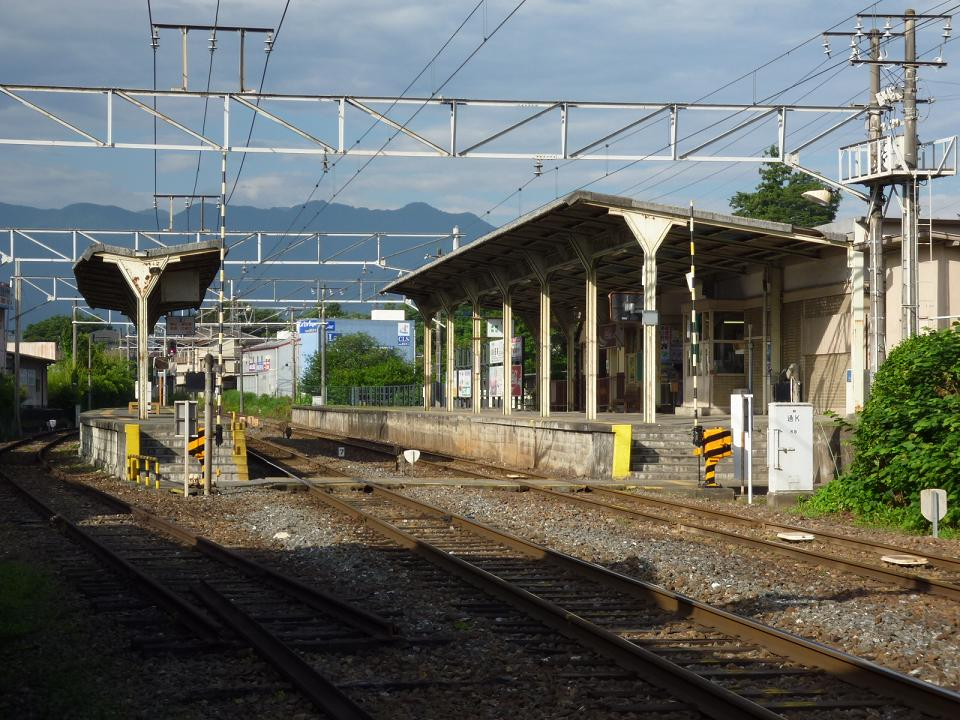
General view of the station from the east, with the severed former freight loop on the left, June 2011

The station is staffed and consists of one side platform and one island platform serving two tracks. An additional bidirectional line for freight services existed as track 3, but is now severed at both ends.

=== Platforms ===
1	■ Chichibu Main Line	for Yorii, Kumagaya and Hanyū
2	■ Chichibu Main Line	for Chichibu, Mitsumineguchi, Hannō, and Ikebukuro (through services via Seibu Chichibu Line)

== History ==
Ōnohara Station opened on 27 October 1914.

== Passenger statistics ==
In fiscal 2018, the station was used by an average of 1127 passengers daily.

== Surrounding area ==
- Arakawa River
- National Route 140
- National Route 299
- Saitama Prefectural Chichibu Agriculture and Science High School
