= Minano =

Minano 皆野町
- Town
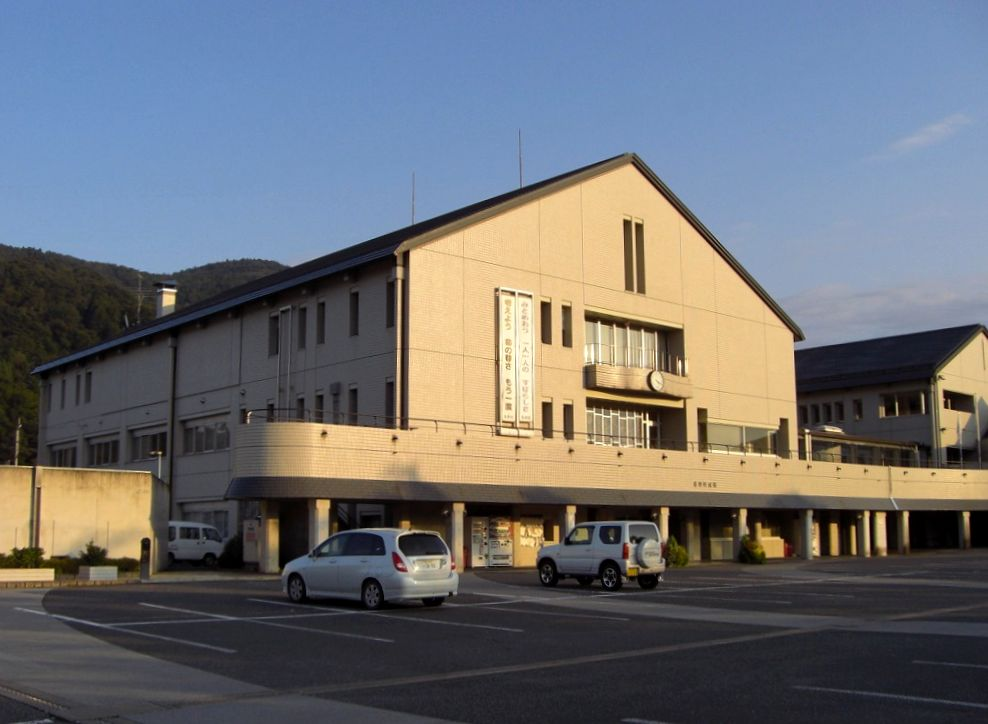
- Minano town office

- Flag Seal

- Location of Minano in Saitama Prefecture

- Coordinates: 36°4′15″N 139°5′55.6″E
- Country: Japan
- Region: Kantō
- Prefecture: Saitama
- District: Chichibu

Area
  - Total: 63.74 km^{2} (24.61 sq mi)

Population (March 2021)
  - Total: 9,497
  - Density: 149.0/km^{2} (385.9/sq mi)
- Time zone: UTC+9 (Japan Standard Time)
- Tree: Ginkgo biloba
- Flower: Albizia julibrissin
- Bird: Japanese white-eye
- Phone number: 0494-62-1230
- Address: 1420-1 Minano, Minano-machi, Chichibu-gun, Saitama-ken 369-1492
- Website: Official website

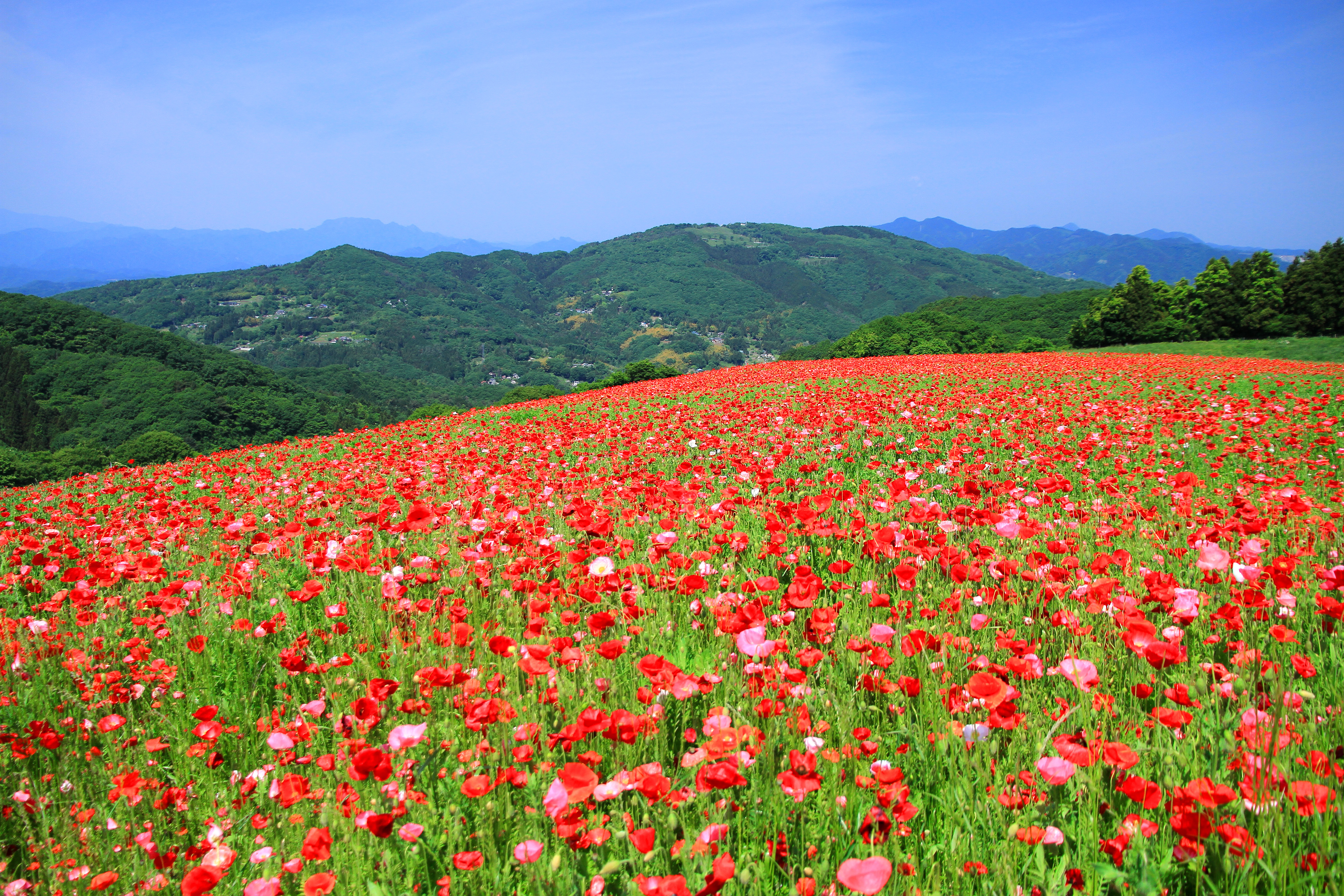
Chichibu Plateau in Minano

Minano (皆野町, Minano-machi) is a town located in Saitama Prefecture, Japan. As of 1 January 2021, the town had an estimated population of 9,497 in 3994 households and a population density of 150 persons per km^{2}. The total area of the town is 63.74 square kilometres (24.61 sq mi).

== Geography ==
Located in western Saitama Prefecture, Minano is on the upper reaches of the Arakawa River.

=== Surrounding municipalities ===
- Saitama Prefecture
  - Chichibu
  - Higashichichibu
  - Honjō
  - Kamikawa
  - Nagatoro
  - Yorii

=== Climate ===
Minano has a humid continental climate (Köppen Cfa) characterized by warm summers and cool winters with light snowfall. The average annual temperature in Minano is 12.8 °C. The average annual rainfall is 2222 mm with September as the wettest month. The temperatures are highest on average in August, at around 24.1 °C, and lowest in January, at around 1.6 °C.

== Demographics ==
Per Japanese census data, the population of Minano has declined steadily over the past 70 years.

Historical population
Year	Pop.	±%
1950	14,852	—
1960	14,147	−4.7%
1970	13,099	−7.4%
1980	12,817	−2.2%
1990	12,571	−1.9%
2000	12,199	−3.0%
2010	10,888	−10.7%
2020	9,302	−14.6%

== History ==
The village of Minano was created within Chichibu District, Saitama with the establishment of the modern municipalities system on April 1, 1889. It was elevated to town status on November 10, 1928. On September 8, 1943 Minano was merged with the neighboring villages of Kunikami, Kanazawa, Hinozawa, Misawa and Ota to form the new town of Mino. However, the town was dissolved on December 1, 1946 back into its original components. On March 1, 1955, Minano again annexed the neighboring villages of Kunikami, Kanazawa, and Hinozawa followed by the village of Misawa on March 31, 1957.

== Government ==
Minano has a mayor-council form of government with a directly elected mayor and a unicameral town council of 12 members. Minano, together with the towns of Higashichichibu, Ogano, Nagatoro and Yokoze, contributes one member to the Saitama Prefectural Assembly. In terms of national politics, the town is part of Saitama 11th district of the lower house of the Diet of Japan.

== Economy ==
The economy of Minano is based primarily on precision machining and agro-tourism.

== Education ==
Minano has three public elementary schools and one public middle school operated by the town government, and one public high school operated by the Saitama Prefectural Board of Education..

== Transportation ==
=== Railway ===
Chichibu Railway - Chichibu Main Line

- Oyahana – Minano

=== Highway ===
- National Route 140

== Local attractions ==
- Chichibu 34 Kannon Sanctuary
- Nagatoro Gorge
