= Saitama Museum of Natural History =

Museum in Nagatoro, Saitama Prefecture, Japan

- 埼玉県立自然の博物館
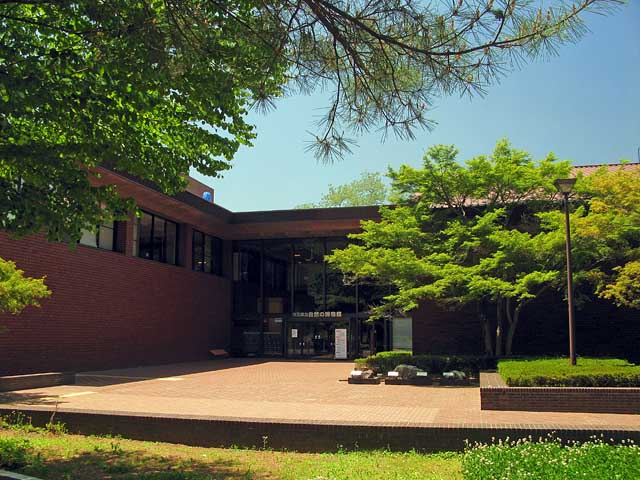
- Interactive map of the Saitama Museum of Natural History area

General information
- Location: 1417-1 Nagatoro, Nagatoro, Saitama Prefecture, Japan
- Coordinates: 36°05′15″N 139°06′58″E
- Opened: 1981

Website
- Official website

Saitama Museum of Natural History (埼玉県立自然の博物館, Saitama kenritsu shizen no hakubutsukan) is a prefectural museum of natural history in Nagatoro, Saitama Prefecture, Japan. The museum opened in 1981 and replaced "史" with "の" in its Japanese name in 2006. The Museum supersedes the Chichibu Natural Science Museum (秩父自然科学博物館) (1949–1980) and the Mineral and Plant Specimen Gallery (鑛物植物標本陳列所) (1921–1949), founded by the Chichibu Railway Company. The collection includes 56 pieces from a Stegodon aurorae skeleton found in 1975, of which there are a further 3 pieces in the Sayama City Museum; both assemblages have been designated a Prefectural Natural Monument.

== Publications ==
- Bulletin of the Saitama Museum of Natural History. New series (埼玉県立自然の博物館研究報告) (2007–; vols. 1–)
- Bulletin of the Saitama Museum of Natural History (埼玉県立自然史博物館研究報告) (1983–2006; vols. 1–23)

== See also ==
- Saitama Prefectural Museum of History and Folklore
