= Karisaka Tunnel =

Coordinates: 35.886825°N 138.792343°E

Karisaka Tunnel 雁坂トンネル有料道路
- Interactive map of Karisaka Tunnel 雁坂トンネル有料道路

Overview
- Location: Saitama Prefecture • Yamanashi Prefecture
- Status: In service
- Route: Japan National Route 140
- Start: Chichibu, Saitama Prefecture
- End: Yamanashi City, Yamanashi Prefecture

Operation
- Work began: October, 1988
- Constructed: September, 1994
- Opened: April, 1998
- Traffic: Automobiles • Motorbikes
- Toll: Passenger cars： 710 yen Mid-sized cars：860 yen Heavy vehicles： 1,170 yen Oversized vehicles：1,980 yen Light motor vehicles (up to 660cc)： 560 yen Motorbikes： 70yen

Technical
- Length: 6,625 m (21,736 ft)
- Operating speed: Not specified. Speed limit: 40km/h Mopeds: 30km/h
- Width: 7.5 m (25 ft)

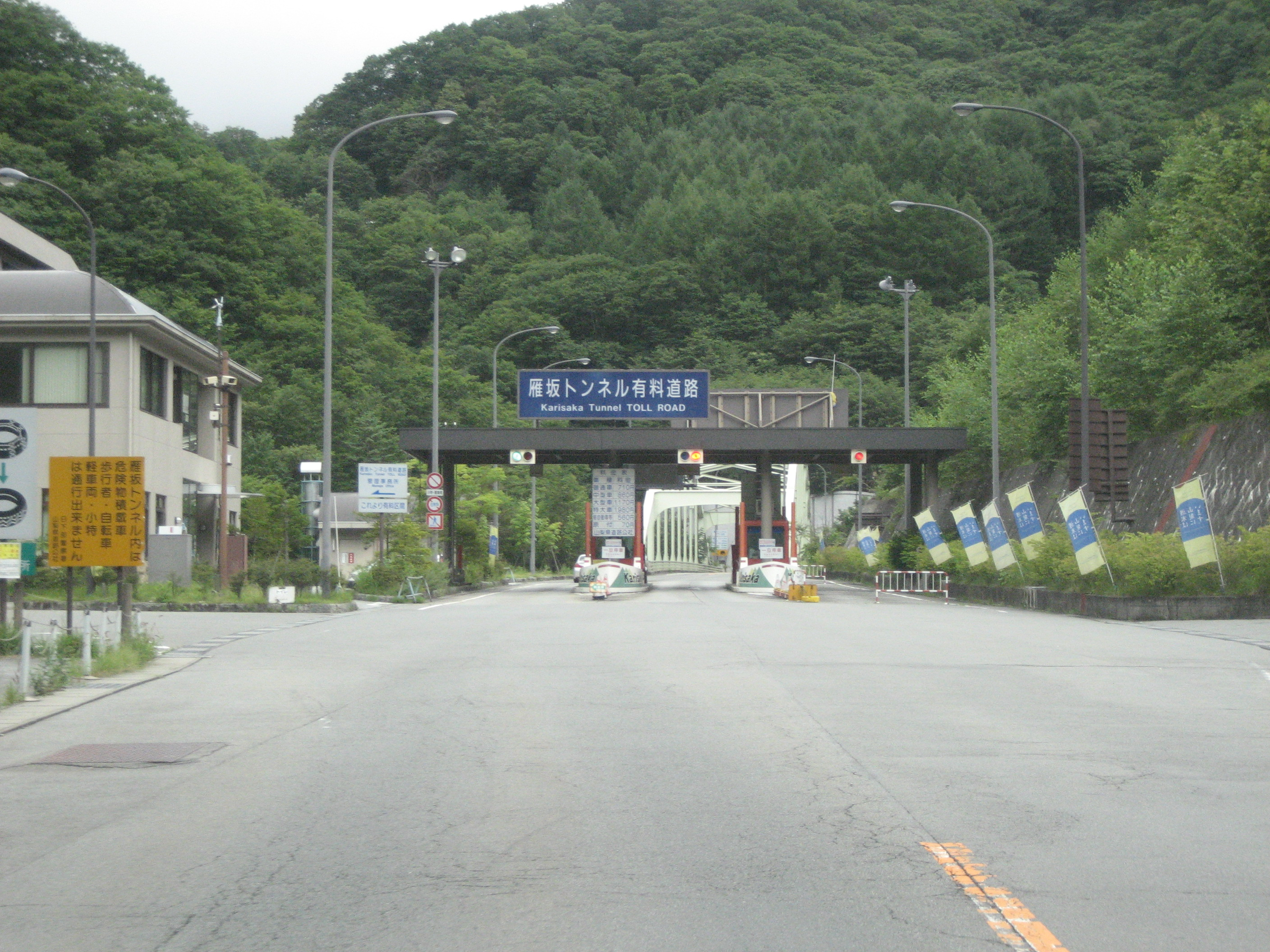
The tollboth at the tunnel entrance on the Yamanashi-prefecture end

The Karisaka Tunnel is a Japanese toll tunnel that opened April 23, 1998 between Chichibu, Saitama Prefecture and Yamanashi City, Yamanashi Prefecture. Until this tunnel opened, there was no direct road connection between Saitama and Yamanashi prefectures.

== Details ==
- At 6,625m long, the tunnel is the fifth-longest road tunnel in Japan.
- Tolls are collected when traveling north from Yamanashi to Saitama.
- Equipped with fire-prevention equipment
- Built using the New Austrian Tunneling method
- Pedestrians, bicycles, and specialized small vehicles are prohibited.
- 50cc motorbikes can be ridden through the tunnel.
- Hazardous cargo is restricted.

Timeline
1953	Plan announced
1968	Surveying began in Saitama and Yamanashi
October 1984	The route was approved
November 1988	Construction began in Yamanashi
May 1989	Groundbreaking was held in Yamanashi
November 1990	Construction began in Saitama
September 1994	Breakthrough
April 23, 1998	Opening
October 1998	Deregulation of large-vehicle traffic
