= Hodosan Ropeway =

Japanese Aerial Lift Line

Coordinates: 36°5′28″N 139°5′36.3″E

Going up the Hodosan Ropeway, 2018

The Hodosan Ropeway (宝登山ロープウェイ, Hodosan Rōpuwei) is a Japanese aerial lift line in Nagatoro, Saitama.

The line is operated by the Chichibu Railway, which merged the former operator Hodo Kōgyō (宝登興業), a subsidiary of Chichibu Railway, in 2025. Opened in 1961, the line climbs Mount Hodo (宝登山) of Chichibu Mountains. Cabins used for the line have not refurbished since its opening. Consequently, they are the oldest aerial lift cabins still used in Kantō region. At the summit, the company also operates a small zoo, a plum garden, and a wintersweet garden.

== Basic data ==
- System: Aerial tramway, 2 track cables and 1 haulage rope
- Cable length: 832 m (2,730 ft)
- Vertical interval: 236 m (774 ft)
- Maximum gradient: 24°56′
- Operational speed: 3.6 m/s
- Passenger capacity per a cabin: 61
- Cabins: 2
- Stations: 2
- Duration of one-way trip: 5 minutes
- One way cost: 700 yen (adults) 350 yen (children) as of January 2026

== See also ==
- List of aerial lifts in Japan
