= Chichibu Station =

Railway station in Saitama Prefecture, Japan

CR30 Chichibu Station 秩父駅
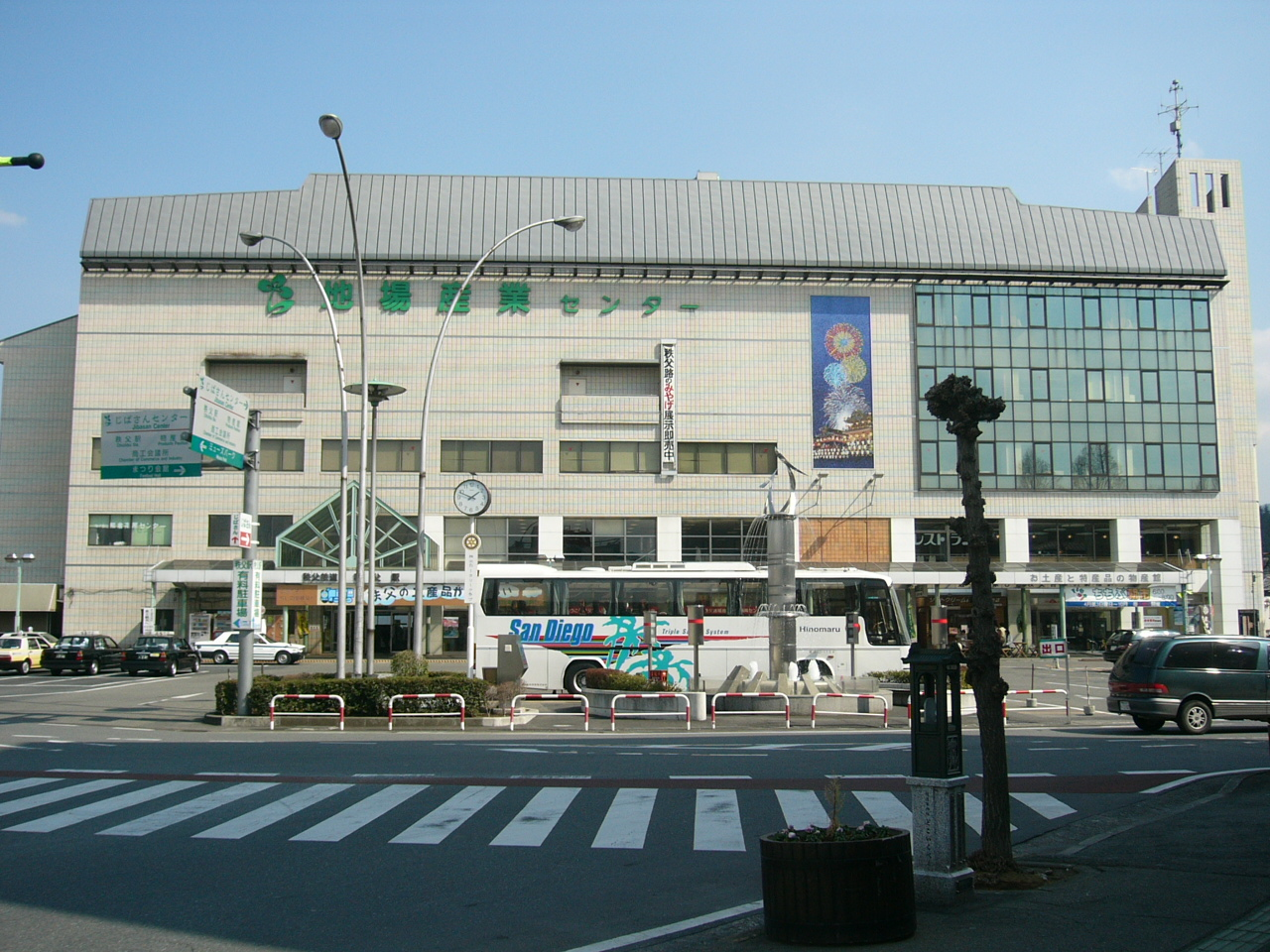
- Chichibu Station building and forecourt, March 2006

General information
- Location: 1–8 Miyakawa-chō, Chichibu-shi, Saitama-ken 368-0046; Japan
- Coordinates: 35.9987°N 139.0858°E
- Operator: Chichibu Railway
- Line: ■ Chichibu Main Line
- Distance: 59.0 km from Hanyū
- Platforms: 1 island platform
- Tracks: 2

Other information
- Status: Staffed
- Website: Official website

History
- Opened: 27 October 1914

Passengers
- FY2018: 1159 daily

Services
Preceding station	Chichibu Railway	Following station
Ohanabatake CR31 towards Mitsumineguchi	SL Paleo Express	Minano CR27 towards Kumagaya
Ohanabatake CR31 towards Mitsumineguchi	Chichibu Main Line Rapid Chichibuji	Minano CR27 towards Hanyū
Ohanabatake CR31 towards Mitsumineguchi	Chichibu Main Line Local	Ōnohara CR29 towards Hanyū
Location
- Location within Saitama Prefecture Location within Japan

Chichibu Station (秩父駅, Chichibu-eki) is a passenger railway station located in the city of Chichibu, Saitama, Japan, operated by the private railway operator Chichibu Railway.

== Lines ==
Chichibu Station is served by the Chichibu Main Line from Hanyū to Mitsumineguchi, and is located 59.0 km from Hanyū.

== Station layout ==
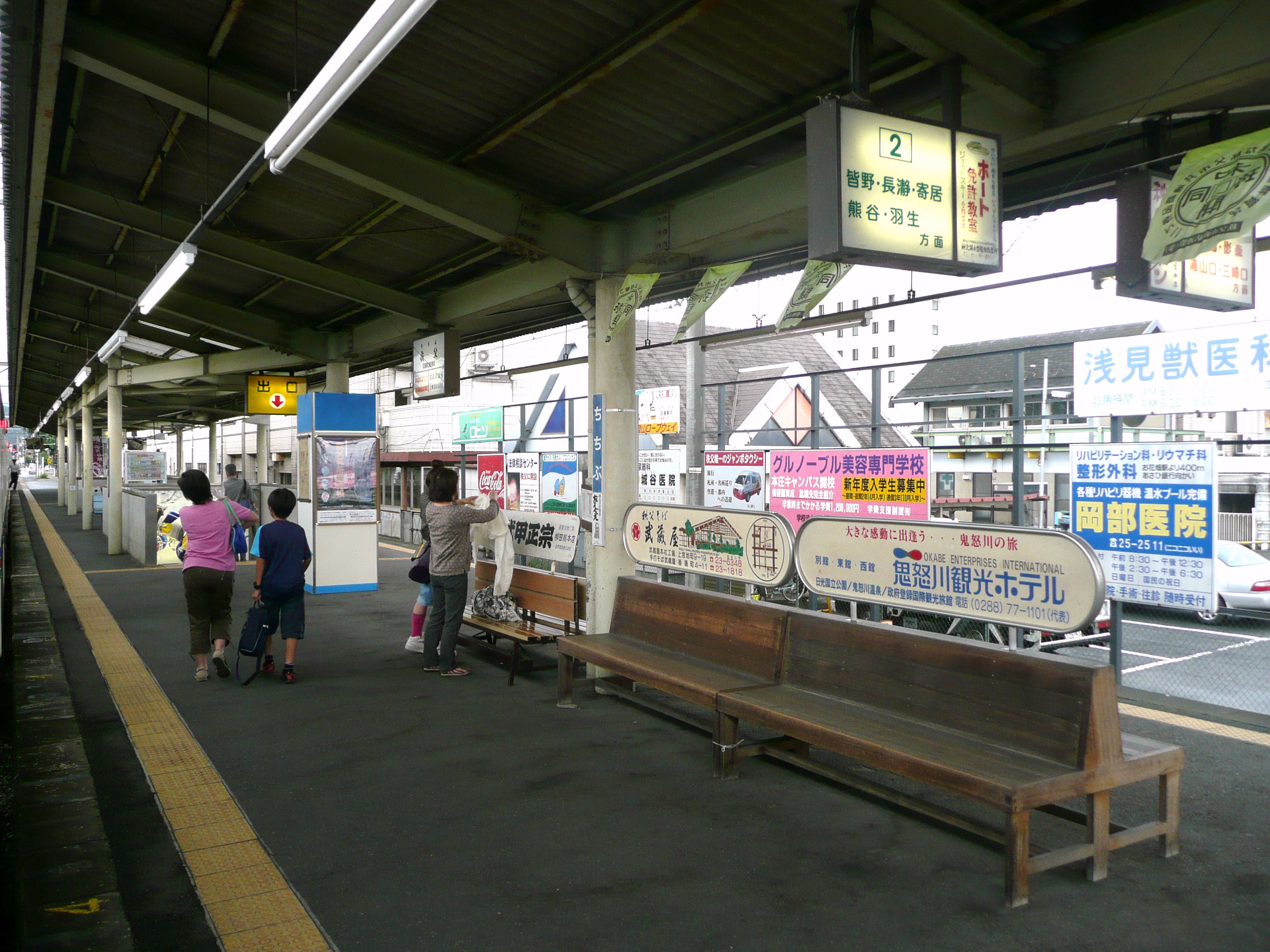
General view of the station platforms, June 2011

The station is staffed and consists of a single island platform serving two bidirectional tracks. Additional bidirectional passing tracks and storage sidings lie to the east of the platform tracks.

A triangular line leading to a now closed cement works formerly existed to the east of the station. This was also used for turning Paleo Express steam locomotives before the installation of a turntable at Mitsumineguchi Station.

=== Platforms ===
1	Chichibu Main Line	for Mitsumineguchi; Seibu Chichibu Line for Hannō
2	Chichibu Main Line	for Yorii, Kumagaya, and Hanyū

== History ==
Chichibu Station opened on 27 October 1914.

== Passenger statistics ==
In fiscal 2018, the station was used by an average of 1159 passengers daily.

== Surrounding area ==
- Arakawa River
- National Route 140
- National Route 299
- Chichibu Shrine
- Chichibu Police Station
- Chichibu Fire Station
- Hitsujiyama Park
