= Mitsumineguchi Station =

Railway station in Chichibu, Saitama Prefecture, Japan

CR37 Mitsumineguchi Station 三峰口駅
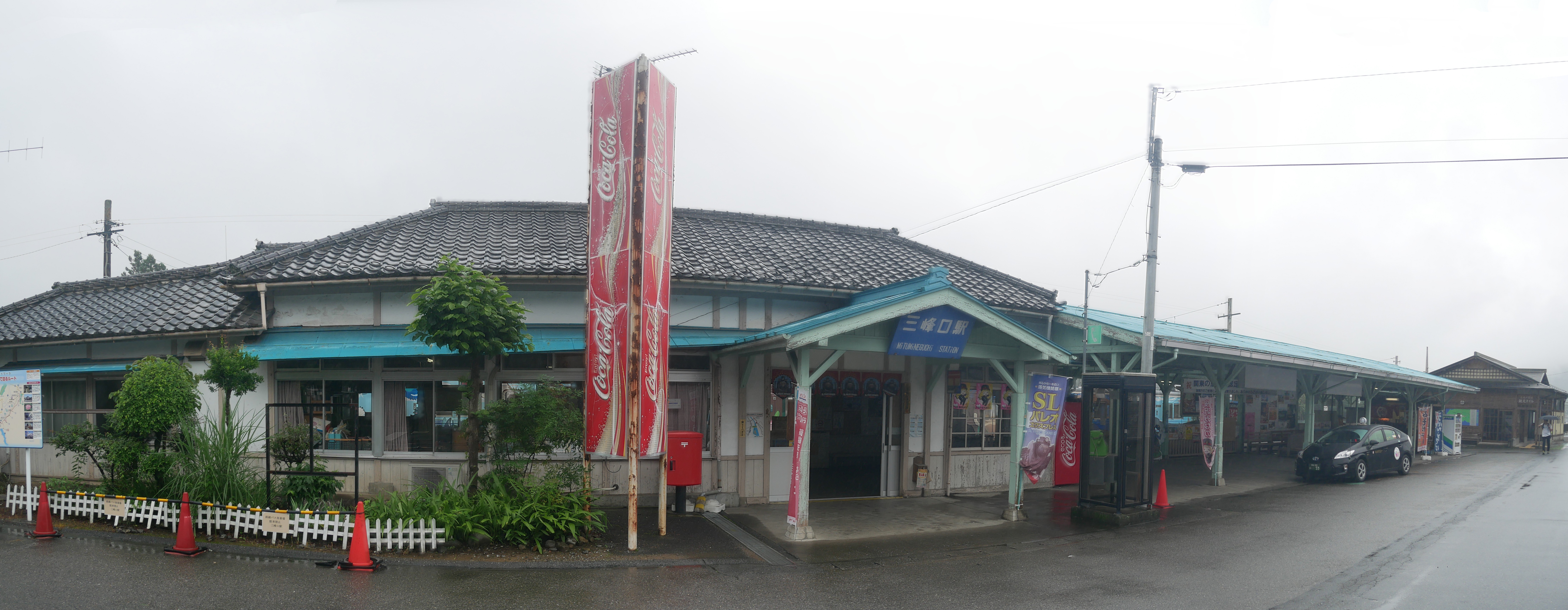
- Mitsumineguchi Station in July 2019

General information
- Location: 1627 Arakawa-shiroku, Chichibu-shi, Saitama-ken 369-1912; Japan
- Coordinates: 35°57′35.78″N 138°58′43.78″E
- Operator: Chichibu Railway
- Line: ■ Chichibu Main Line
- Distance: 71.7 km from Hanyū
- Platforms: 1 side + 1 island platform

Other information
- Status: Staffed
- Website: Official website

History
- Opened: 15 March 1930

Passengers
- FY2018: 384 daily

Services
Preceding station	Chichibu Railway	Following station
Terminus	SL Paleo Express	Ohanabatake CR31 towards Kumagaya
Terminus	Chichibu Main Line Rapid Chichibuji	Kagemori CR32 towards Hanyū
Terminus	Chichibu Main Line Local	Shiroku CR36 towards Hanyū
Location
- Location within Saitama Prefecture Location within Japan

Mitsumineguchi Station (三峰口駅, Mitsumineguchi-eki) is a passenger railway station located in the city of Chichibu, Saitama, Japan, operated by the private railway operator Chichibu Railway.

== Lines ==
Mitsumineguchi Station is the terminus of the Chichibu Main Line, and is located 71.7 km from the opposing terminus of the line at Hanyū. It is also served by through services to and from the Seibu Chichibu Line.

== Station layout ==
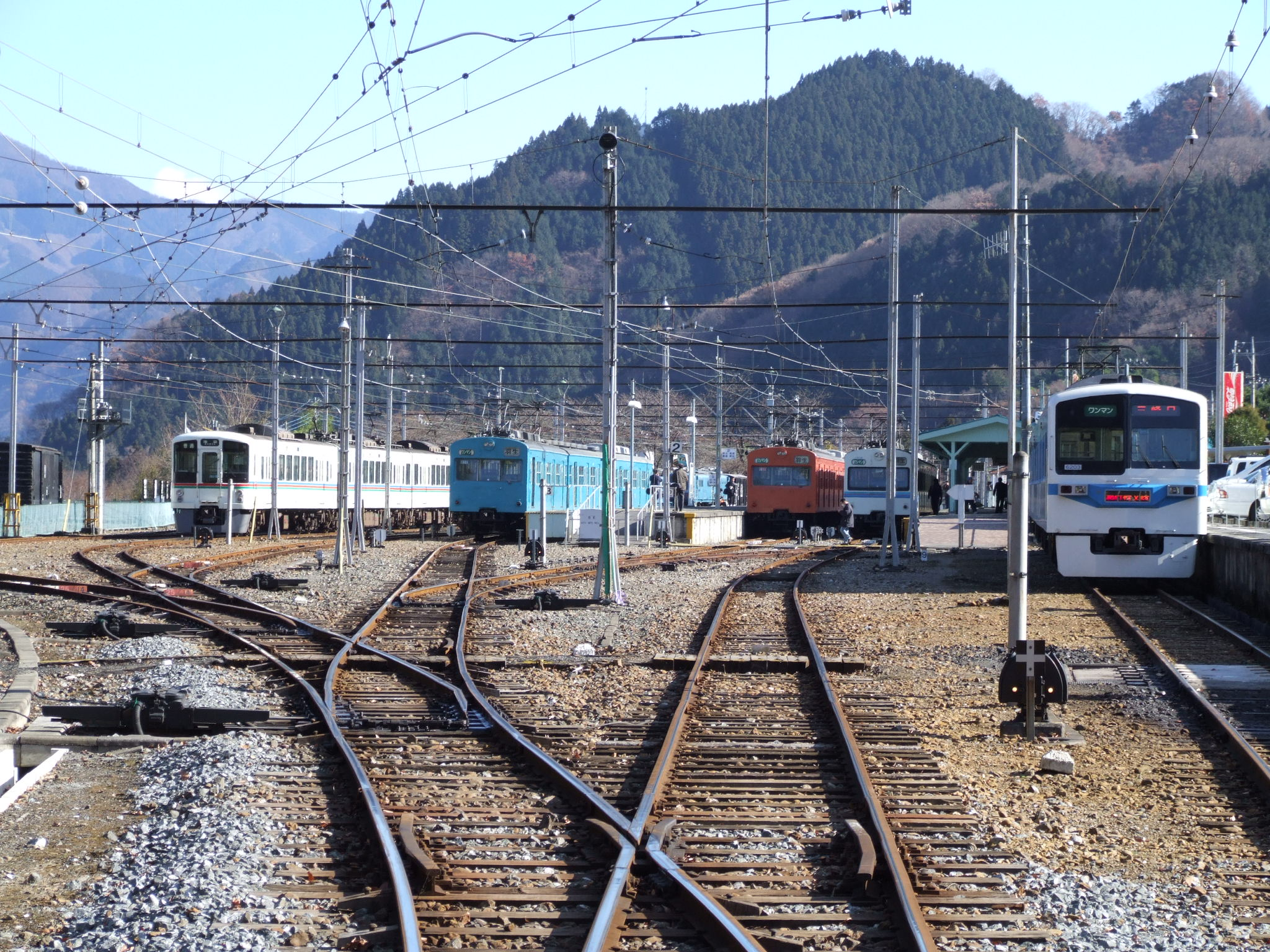
View of the station area from the western end, December 2007

The station is staffed and consists of one side platform (platform 1) and one island platform (platforms 2/3) serving three tracks. Stabling and run-round tracks are also provided next to track 3 and in the former freight platforms. A turntable is provided for turning steam locomotives used on SL Paleo Express services.

=== Platforms ===
1-3	Chichibu Main Line	for Chichibu, Yorii, Kumagaya, and Hanyū; Seibu Chichibu Line for Hannō

== History ==
Mitsumineguchi Station opened on 15 March 1930.

== Passenger statistics ==
In fiscal 2018, the station was used by an average of 384 passengers daily.

== Buses ==
No	Via	Destination	Company	Note
M4 Mitsumine Express Line	Lake Chichibu	Mitsumine Shrine	Seibu Kankō Bus	

== Surrounding area ==
- Arakawa River
- National Route 140

=== Chichibu Railway Park ===
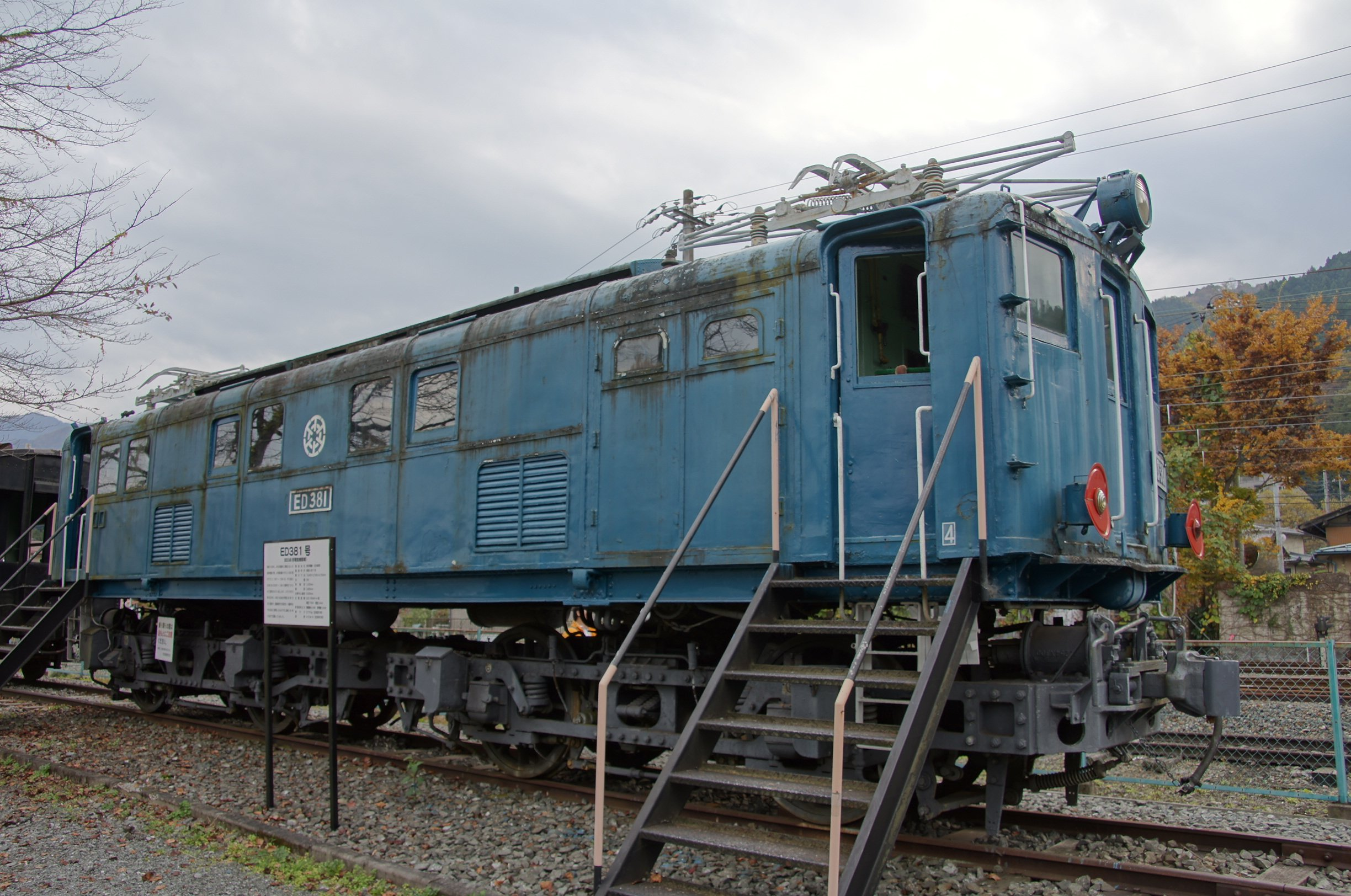
ED38 1, November 2011

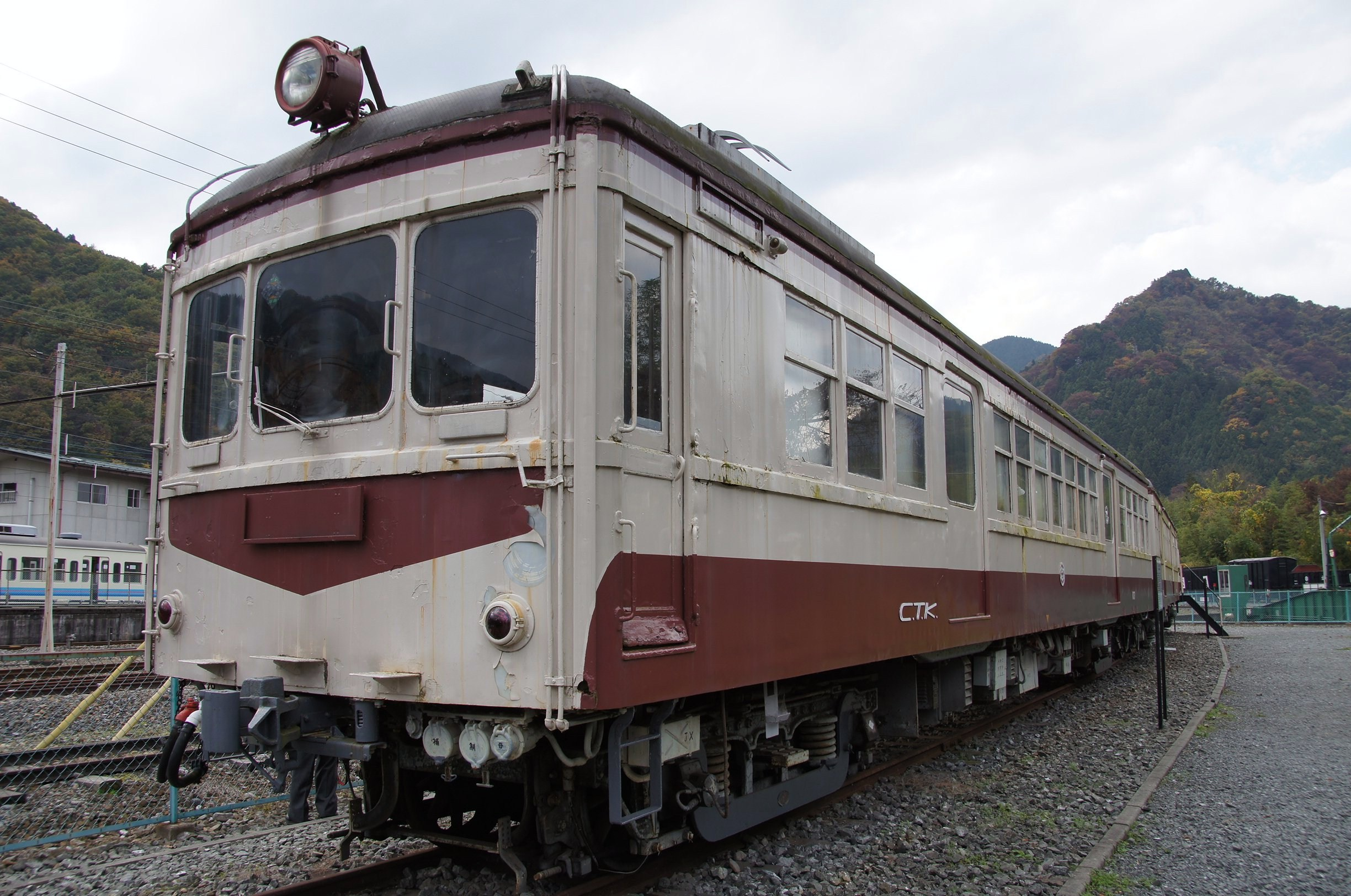
DeHa 107, November 2011

A number of old Chichibu Railway vehicles are preserved in the Chichibu Railway Park located on the north side of the station, adjacent to the turntable.

The following vehicles are on display.

- Class DeKi1 electric locomotive number DeKi1
- Class ED38 electric locomotive number ED38 1
- DeHa 100 EMU car number DeHa 107
- KuHaNi 20 EMU car number KuHaNi 29
- SuMu 4000 freight car number SuMu 4023
- ToKi 500 freight car number ToKi 502
- Yo 10 guard's van number Yo 15
- WaKi 800 freight car number WaKi 824
- WaFu 51 freight car number WaFu 51

== See also ==
- List of railway stations in Japan
