= Japan National Route 140 =

Road in Japan

National Route 140
- 国道140号
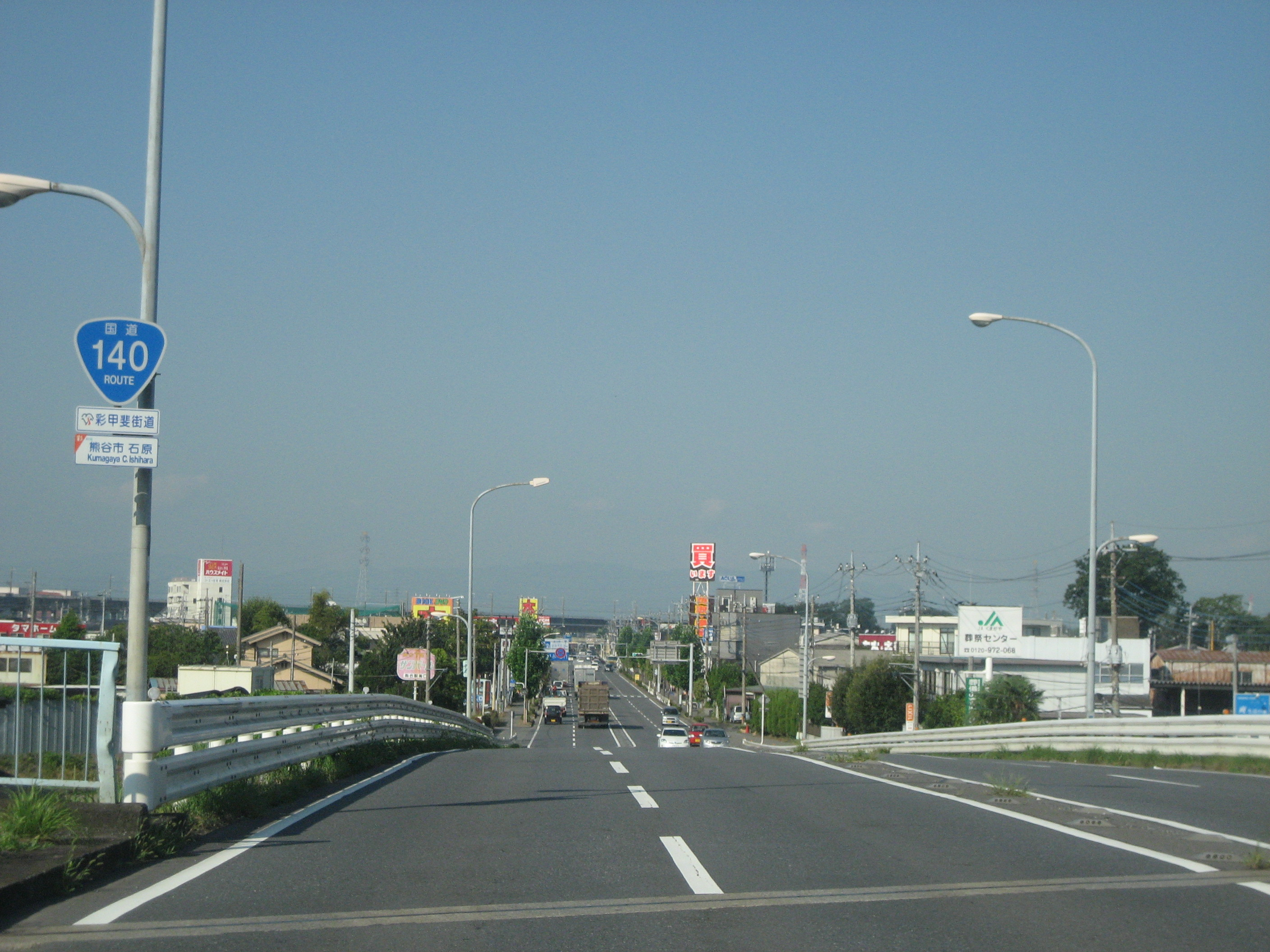
- Route 140 in Kumagaya

Route information
- Length: 150.4 km (93.5 mi)
- Existed: 1953–present

Major junctions
- South end: National Route 52 in Fujikawa, Yamanashi
- North end: National Route 17 / National Route 407 in Kumagaya

Location
- Country: Japan

Highway system
- National highways of Japan; Expressways of Japan
← National Route 139	→ National Route 141

National Route 140 is a national highway of Japan connecting Kumagaya, Saitama and Fujikawa, Yamanashi in Japan, with a total length of 146.6 km (91.1 mi).

The route includes the Karisaka Tunnel, first opened in 1998 and at 6.225 km (3.868 mi) is the fifth-longest road tunnel in Japan.Because it is the main road connecting Saitama and Yamanashi, both prefectures are developing the Nishikanto Road.
