= Chichibu Railway =

Japanese railway company

Chichibu Railway Co., Ltd.
- Logo used since FY2019
- Native name: 秩父鉄道株式会社
- Romanized name: Chichibu Tetsudō kabushiki gaisha
- Type: Publicly listed subsidiary KK
- Traded as: JASDAQ: 9012
- Industry: Railway
- Founded: 8 November 1899
- Headquarters: Kumagaya, Saitama, Japan
- Key people: Shigetoshi Arafune (CEO)
- Owner: Taiheiyo Cement (33.51%); Tobu Railway (0.7%)
- Number of employees: 356 (601 incl. related businesses)
- Parent: Taiheiyo Cement Corporation (33.50%)
- Website: www.chichibu-railway.co.jp/en/

Chichibu Railway (秩父鉄道株式会社, Chichibu Tetsudō Kabushiki-gaisha) is a small-sector private railway company operating a railway line in northern Saitama Prefecture, Japan. In addition to its railway operations, the company deals in the real estate and tourism industries. It managed the Mitsumine Ropeway (三峰ロープウェイ) until it closed in December 2007 and the Mikajiri Line until its closure in 2020.

Taiheiyo Cement is its largest shareholder, and one of Chichibu Railway's main operations is the transportation of limestone from Mount Bukō. The railway's passenger services concentrate on the tourism industry as there are popular destinations along the line. A train hauled by a steam locomotive also operates regularly during some seasons.

== Lines ==
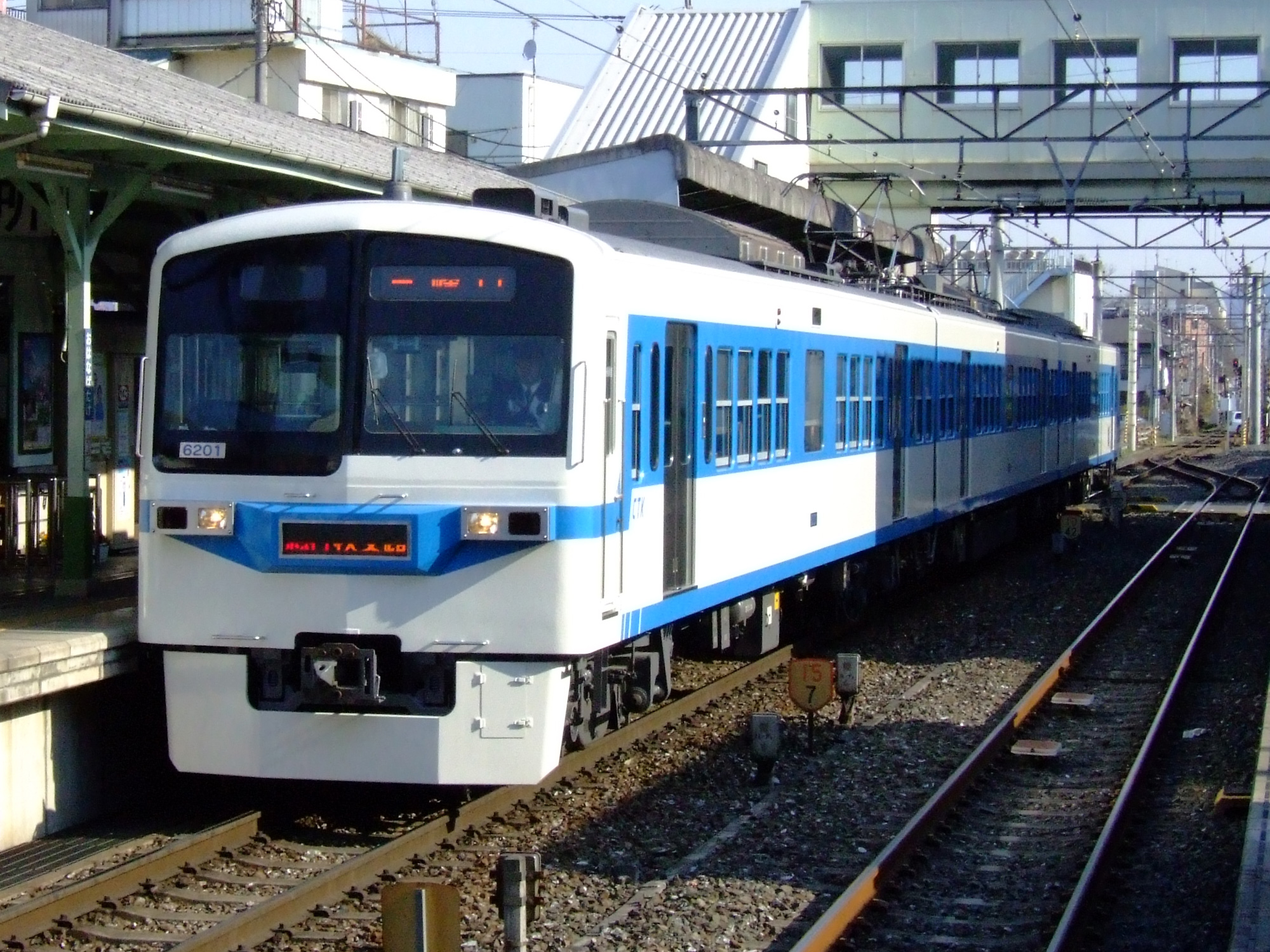
A Chichibu Railway 6000 series train

=== Railway lines ===
- Chichibu Main Line: from Hanyū to Mitsumineguchi (passenger line)

==== Former lines ====
- Mikajiri Line (三ヶ尻線): from Takekawa Station to Kumagaya Kamotsu Terminal (freight line which carried coal, closed in 2020)

=== Aerial tramway lines ===
- Mitsumine Ropeway at Mitsumineguchi (closed in December 2007)
- Hodosan Ropeway in Nagatoro, Saitama

== History ==
- 8 November 1899 - Founded as Jōbu Railway (Headquartered in now-defunct Nihonbashi Ward, Tokyo City).
- 7 October 1901 - Started operations between Kumagaya and Yorii.
- 1916 - Company name changed to Chichibu Railway.
- 1921 - Started operations between Hokubu Railway's Hanyu Station and Gyoda Station (now Gyodashi Station).
- 1922 - Chichibu Railway acquired Hokubu Railway.
- 1930 - Started operations on the full line between Hanyu and Mitsumineguchi.
- 1954 - Started direct operations with the Tōbu Tōjō Line.
- 1980 - Headquarters moved to Kumagaya, Saitama.
- 1988 - Started operations of a steam locomotive-hauled train, the Paleo Express.
- 1989 - Started direct operations with Seibu Railway.
- 1997 - Moved bus operations to a separate entity, Chichibu Railway Sightseeing Bus Co., Ltd.
- 12 March 2022 - Support for PASMO and Nationwide Mutual Usage Service IC cards along the entire line.
- 1 October 2025 - Merges with subsidiary Hodo Kōgyō, operator of Hodosan Ropeway
- March 2028 - Seibu Chichibu Line though-service discontinued because all of the Seibu Railway trains were replaced by VVVF trains and VVVF trains aren't able to run on Chichibu Railway.

== Future plans ==
Chichibu Railway considers that discontinue Chichibu Main Line between Kagemori Station and Mitsumineguchi Station. And, it shows local governments should operate route buses in the section which replace when discontinue the section. If local governments which are located in west of Saitama give Chichibu Railway train's operation subsidies, Chichibu Railway selects other options. This is because the profits of train operation between Mitsumineguchi Sta. and Kagemori Sta. gradually decrease by years and less than 400 passengers a day ride in the section. But, this company and local government plan to construct a ropeway service which connects Mitsumineguchi Sta. with Mitsumine Shrine. So, in case of the redevelopment success,and when Chichibu Main Line between Kagemori Sta. and Mitsumineguchi Sta. will be owned and managed by local governments, Chichibu Railway continues operating trains in the section.
