= Chichibu Main Line =

Railway line in Saitama Prefecture, Japan

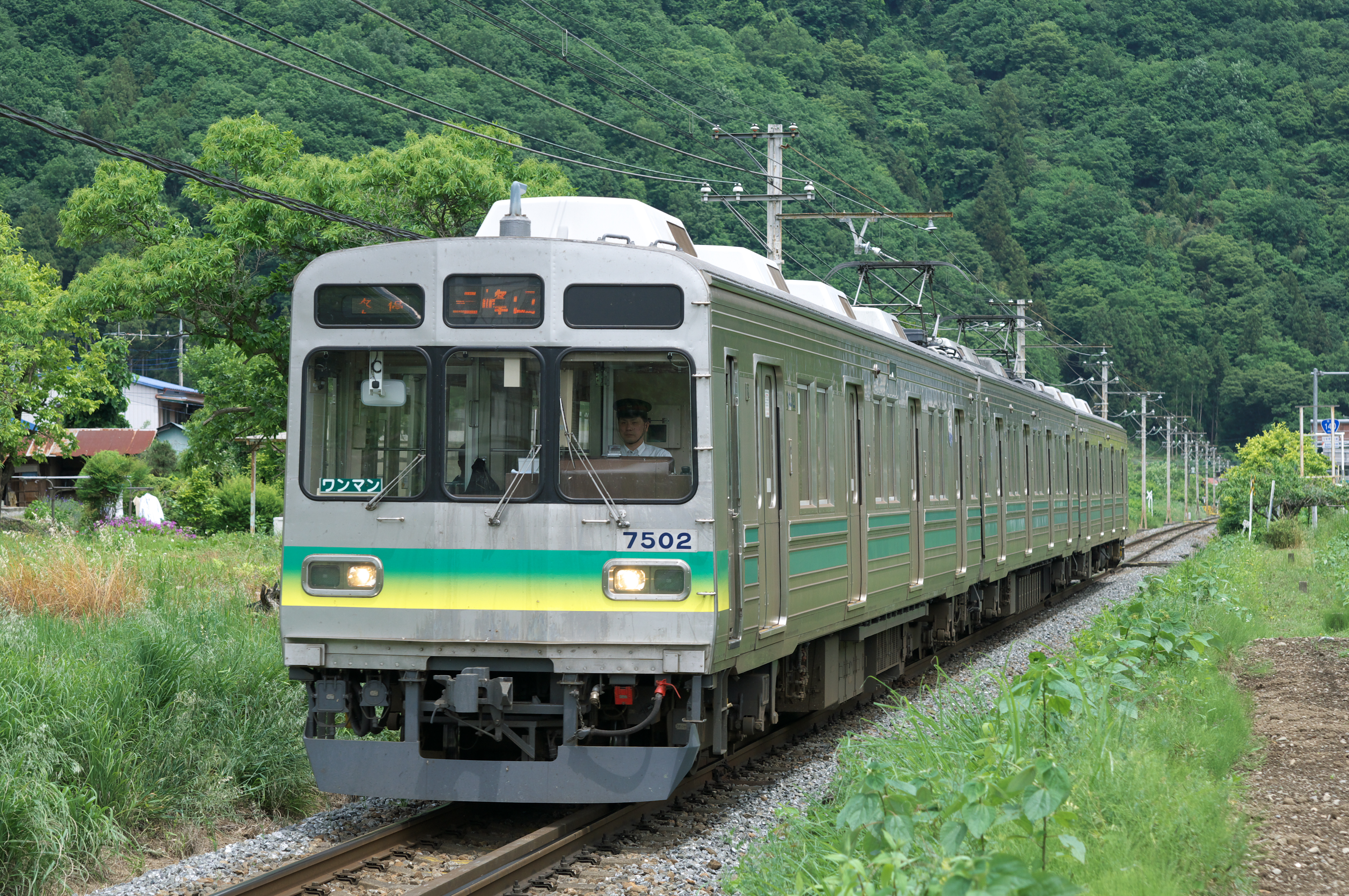
- A Chichibu Railway 7500 series EMU on the Chichibu Main Line in May 2011

Overview
- Native name: 秩父本線
- Owner: Chichibu Railway
- Locale: Saitama Prefecture
- Termini: Hanyū; Mitsumineguchi
- Stations: 36

Service
- Depot(s): Hirosegawara

History
- Opened: 7 October 1901

Technical
- Line length: 71.7 km (44.6 mi)
- Number of tracks: 1
- Track gauge: 1,067 mm (3 ft 6 in)
- Minimum radius: 149 m
- Electrification: 1500 V DC with Overhead catenary
- Operating speed: 85 km/h (55 mph)

The Chichibu Main Line (秩父本線, Chichibu-honsen) is a railway line in Japan, owned by the private railway operator Chichibu Railway, linking Hanyū and Mitsumineguchi, both in Saitama Prefecture.

Outside and inside a Chichibu Main Line train near Bushū-Nakagawa Station, 2019

== Stations ==
Chichibu Main Line map

Station No.	Station name		Distance (km)		Local service to/from Seibu Chichibu Line (Weekends)		Chichibuji Express	SL Paleo Express	Transfer	Location
Station No.	English	Japanese	Between Stations	Total	Local service to/from Seibu Chichibu Line (Weekends)		Chichibuji Express	SL Paleo Express	Transfer	Location
CR01	Hanyū	羽生	-	0.0			●		Isesaki Line (TI07)	Hanyū
CR02	Nishi-Hanyū	西羽生	1.2	1.2			|			Hanyū
CR03	Shingō	新郷	1.4	2.6			|			Hanyū
CR04	Bushū-Araki	武州荒木	2.2	4.8			|			Gyōda
CR05	Higashi-Gyōda	東行田	2.5	7.3			|			Gyōda
CR06	Gyōdashi	行田市	1.0	8.3			●			Gyōda
CR07	Mochida	持田	1.8	10.1			|			Gyōda
CR08	Socio Distribution Center	ソシオ流通センター	1.5	11.6			|			Kumagaya
CR09	Kumagaya	熊谷	3.3	14.9			●	●	Jōetsu Shinkansen; Hokuriku Shinkansen; ■ Takasaki Line	Kumagaya
CR10	Kami-Kumagaya	上熊谷	0.9	15.8			|	|		Kumagaya
CR11	Ishiwara	石原	1.2	17.0			|	|		Kumagaya
CR12	Hirose-Yachō-no-Mori	ひろせ野鳥の森	1.5	18.5			|	|		Kumagaya
CR13	Ōasō	大麻生	1.3	20.3			|	|		Kumagaya
CR14	Aketo	明戸	2.6	22.9			|	|		Fukaya
CR15	Takekawa	武川	1.9	24.8			●	|	Chichibu Railway: Mikajiri Freight Line	Fukaya
CR16	Nagata	永田	2.3	27.1			|	|		Fukaya
CR17	Fukaya Hanazono	ふかや花園	1.1	28.2			●	●		Fukaya
CR18	Omaeda	小前田	2.3	30.5			|	|		Fukaya
CR19	Sakurazawa	桜沢	1.4	31.9			|	|		Yorii, Ōsato District
CR20	Yorii	寄居	1.9	33.8			●	●	■ Hachikō Line; Tojo Line (TJ39)	Yorii, Ōsato District
CR21	Hagure	波久礼	3.9	37.7			|	|		Yorii, Ōsato District
CR22	Higuchi	樋口	4.4	42.1			|	|		Nagatoro, Chichibu District
CR23	Nogami	野上	2.6	44.7			●	|		Nagatoro, Chichibu District
CR24	Nagatoro	長瀞	1.8	46.5	●		●	●		Nagatoro, Chichibu District
CR25	Kami-Nagatoro	上長瀞	1.1	47.6	↑	Through operation to Seibu-Chichibu (Seibu Chichibu Line)	|	|		Nagatoro, Chichibu District
CR26	Oyahana	親鼻	1.6	49.2	↑	Through operation to Seibu-Chichibu (Seibu Chichibu Line)	|	|		Minano, Chichibu District
CR27	Minano	皆野	1.6	50.8	●	Through operation to Seibu-Chichibu (Seibu Chichibu Line)	●	●		Minano, Chichibu District
CR28	Wadō-Kuroya	和銅黒谷	2.6	53.4	↑	Through operation to Seibu-Chichibu (Seibu Chichibu Line)	|	|		Chichibu
CR29	Ōnohara	大野原	3.2	56.6	↑	Through operation to Seibu-Chichibu (Seibu Chichibu Line)	|	|		Chichibu
CR30	Chichibu	秩父	2.4	59.0	●	Through operation to Seibu-Chichibu (Seibu Chichibu Line)	●	●		Chichibu
CR31	Ohanabatake	御花畑	0.7	59.7	●	Through operation to Seibu-Chichibu (Seibu Chichibu Line)	●	●	Seibu Chichibu Line (Seibu-Chichibu: SI36)	Chichibu
CR32	Kagemori	影森	2.7	62.4	Through operation to Yokoze (Seibu Chichibu Line)	●	●	|		Chichibu
CR33	Urayamaguchi	浦山口	1.4	63.8	Through operation to Yokoze (Seibu Chichibu Line)	●	↓	|		Chichibu
CR34	Bushū-Nakagawa	武州中川	2.4	66.2	Through operation to Yokoze (Seibu Chichibu Line)	●	↓	|		Chichibu
CR35	Bushū-Hino	武州日野	1.5	67.7	Through operation to Yokoze (Seibu Chichibu Line)	●	↓	|		Chichibu
CR36	Shiroku	白久	2.7	70.4	Through operation to Yokoze (Seibu Chichibu Line)	●	↓	|		Chichibu
CR37	Mitsumineguchi	三峰口	1.3	71.7	Through operation to Yokoze (Seibu Chichibu Line)	●	●	●		Chichibu

== Rolling stock ==
As of 1 April 2016, the Chichibu Railway operates the following fleet of rolling stock on the line.

- 5000 series 3-car EMUs x3 (formerly Toei 6000 series) (since 1999)
- 6000 series 3-car EMUs x3 (formerly Seibu 101 series) (since March 2006)
- 7000 series 3-car EMUs x2 (formerly Tokyu 8500 series) (since March 2009)
- 7500 series 3-car EMUs x7 (formerly Tokyu 8090 series) (since March 2010)
- 7800 series 2-car EMUs x4 (formerly Tokyu 8090 series) (since 16 March 2013)
- Class C58 steam locomotive (No. C58 363 for Paleo Express)
- Four 12 series passenger coaches for Paleo Express (OHaFu 12-101 and 102, OHa 12-111 and 112)
- DeKi 100 electric locomotives (x6)
- DeKi 200 electric locomotive (x1)
- DeKi 300 electric locomotives (x3)
- DeKi 500 electric locomotives (x7)
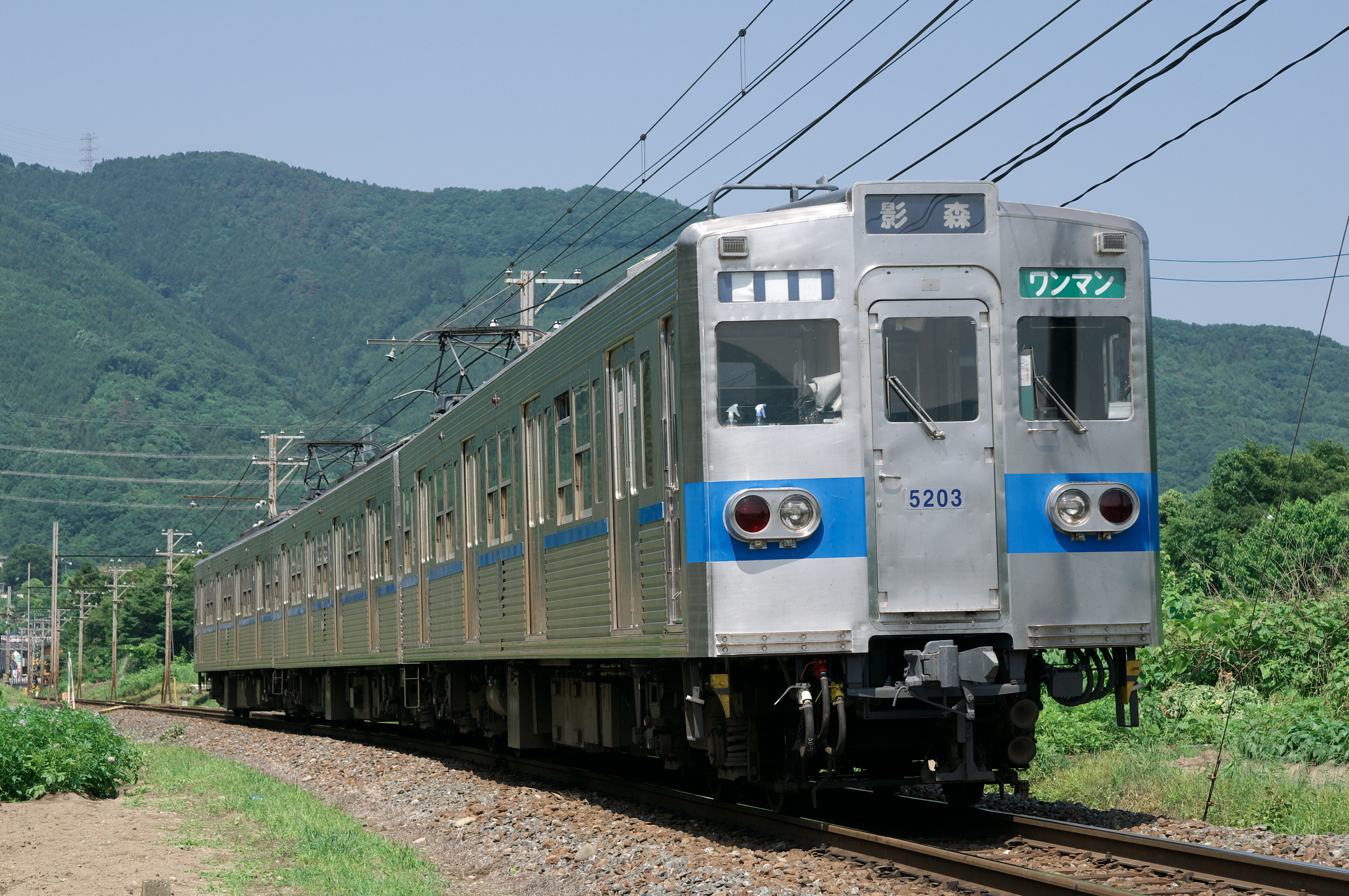
5000 series EMU set 5003 in June 2011

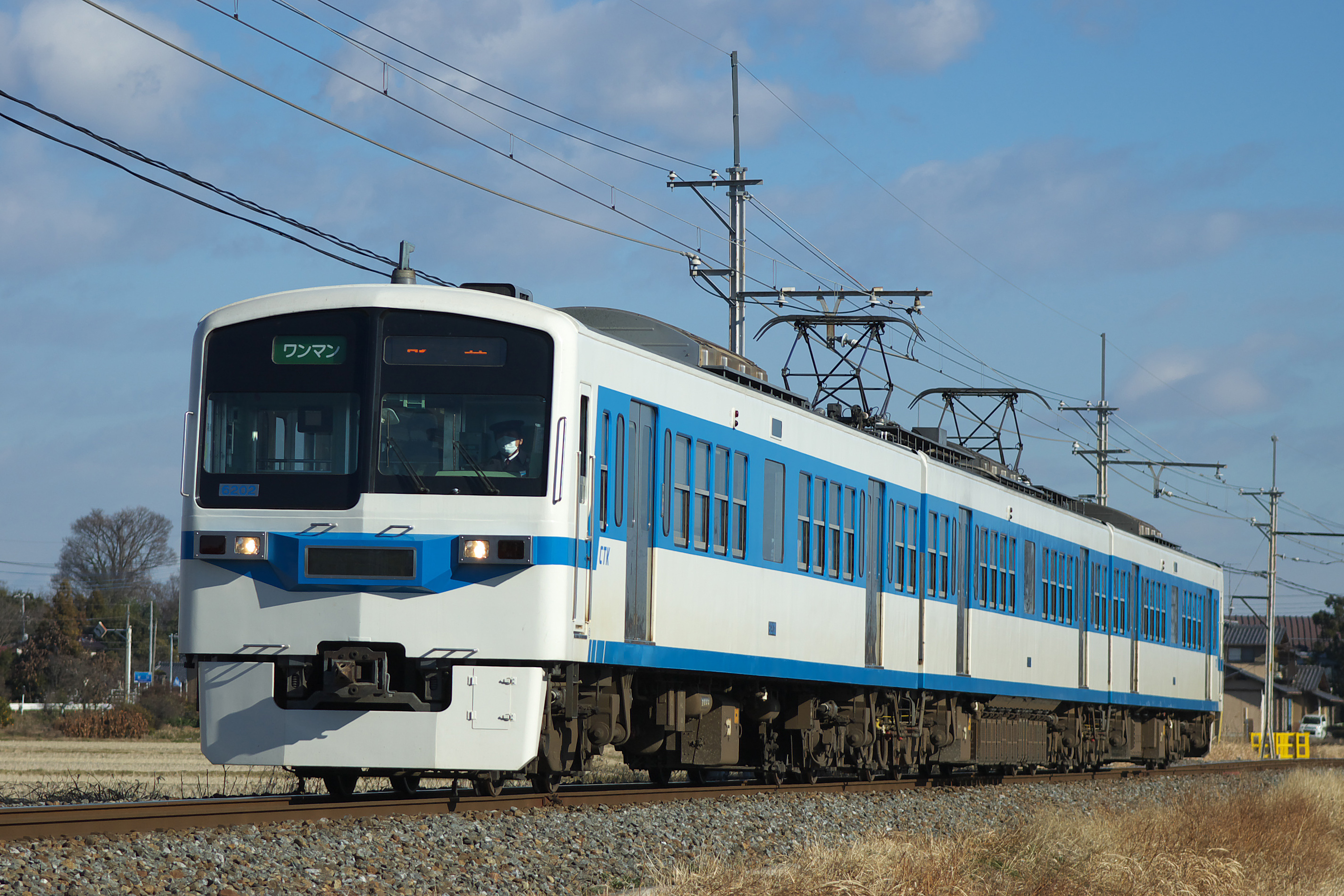
A 6000 series EMU on a Chichibuji express service

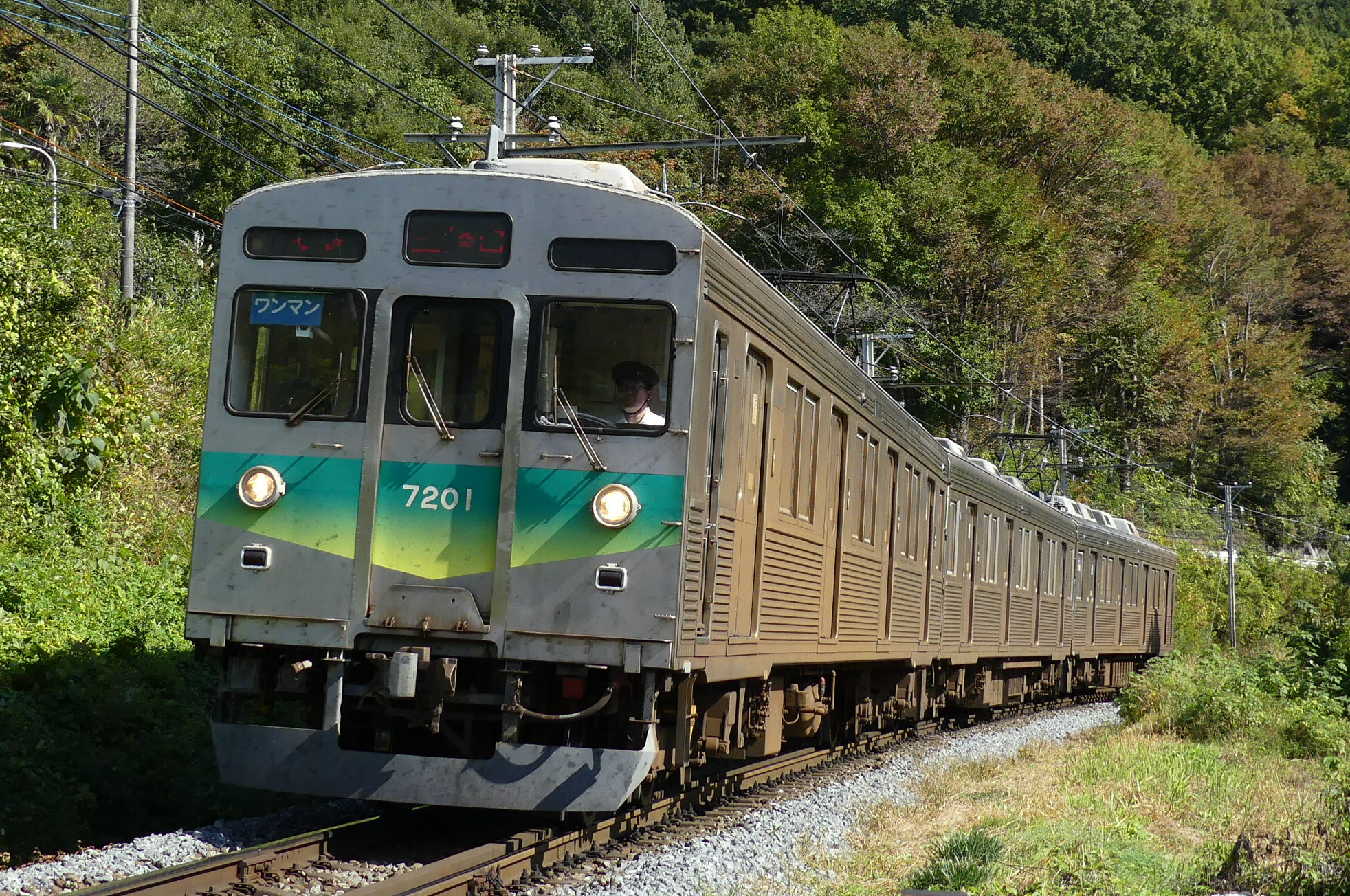
7000 series EMU set 7001 in October 2018

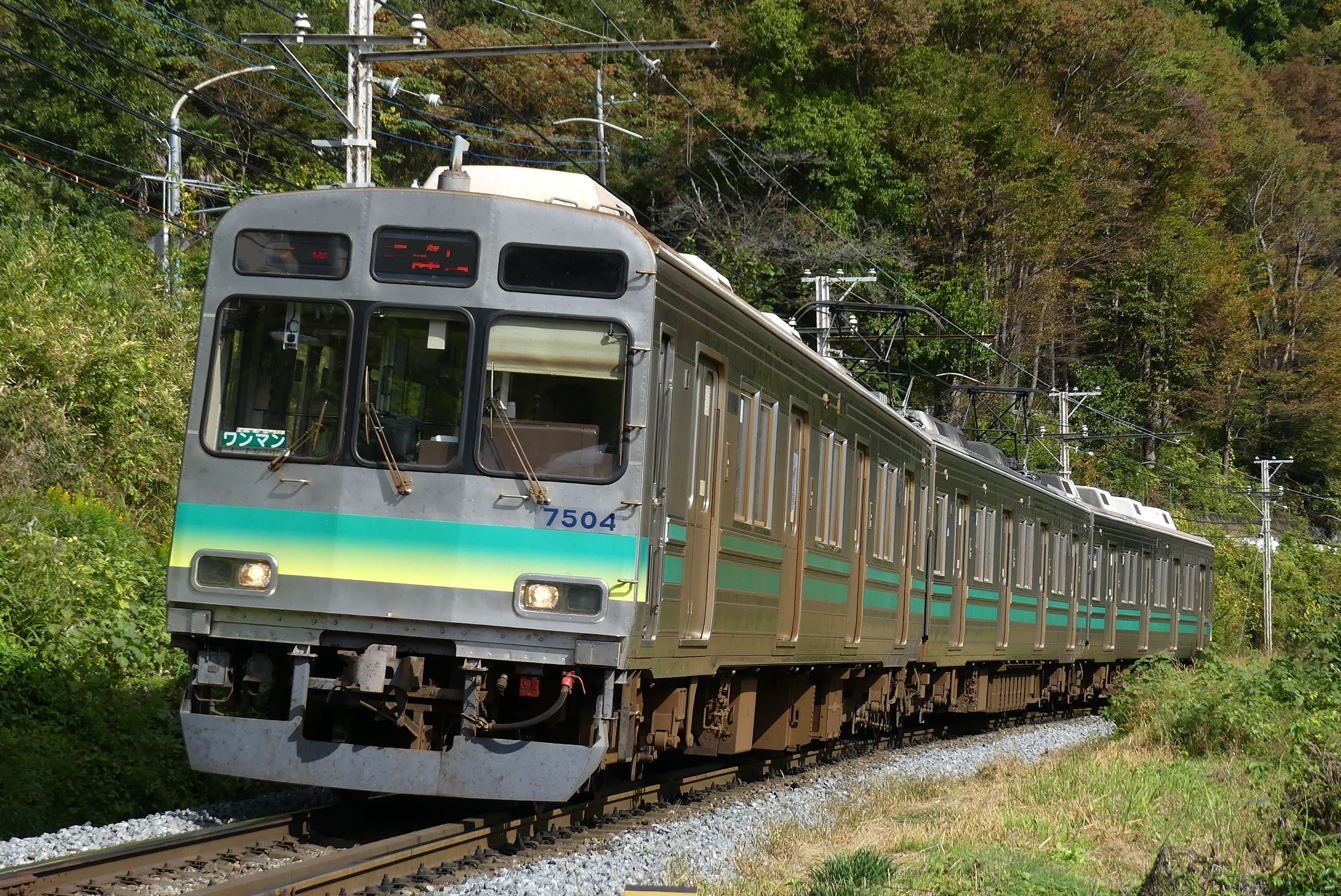
7500 series EMU set 7504 in October 2018

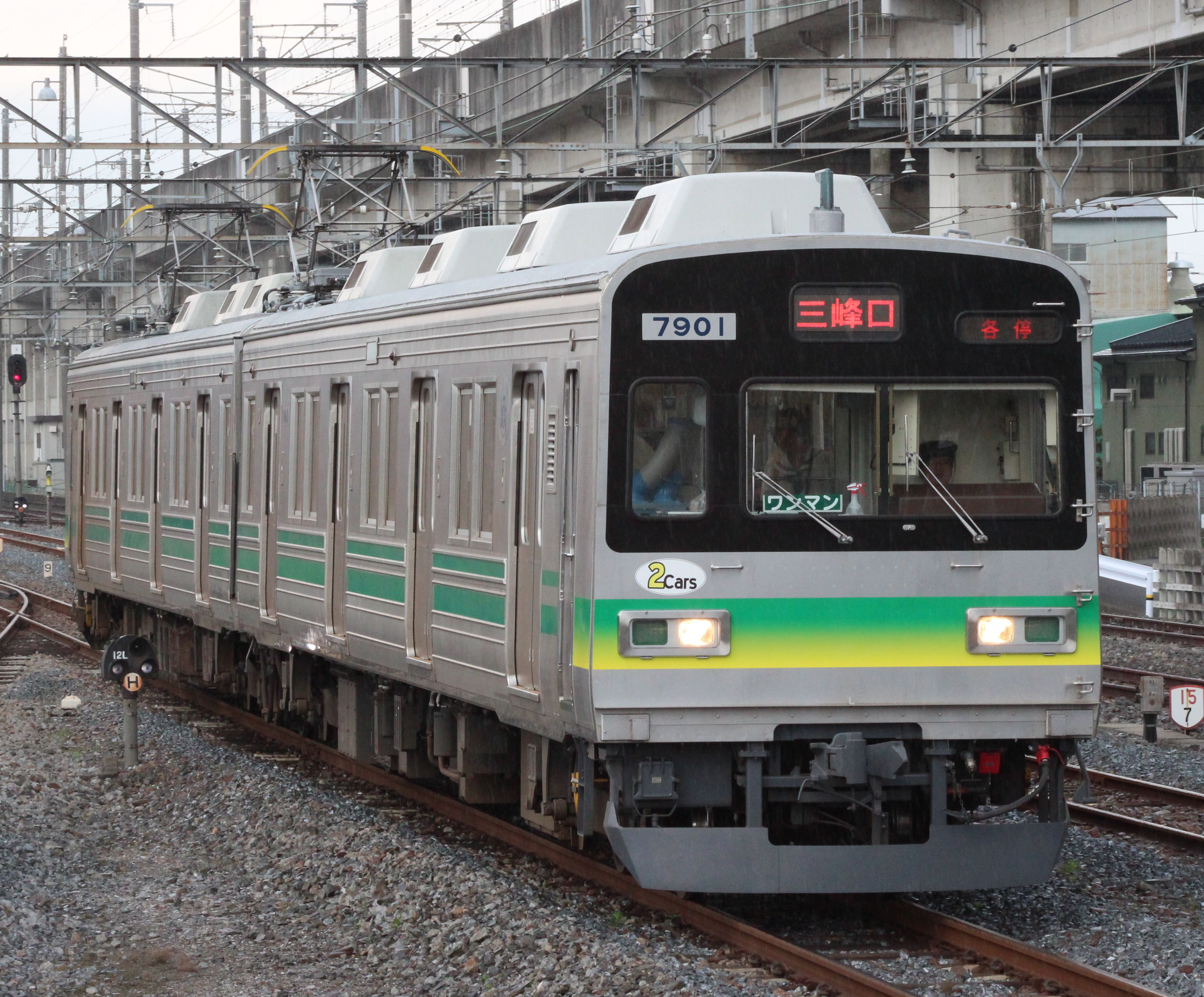
7800 series EMU set 7801 in June 2013

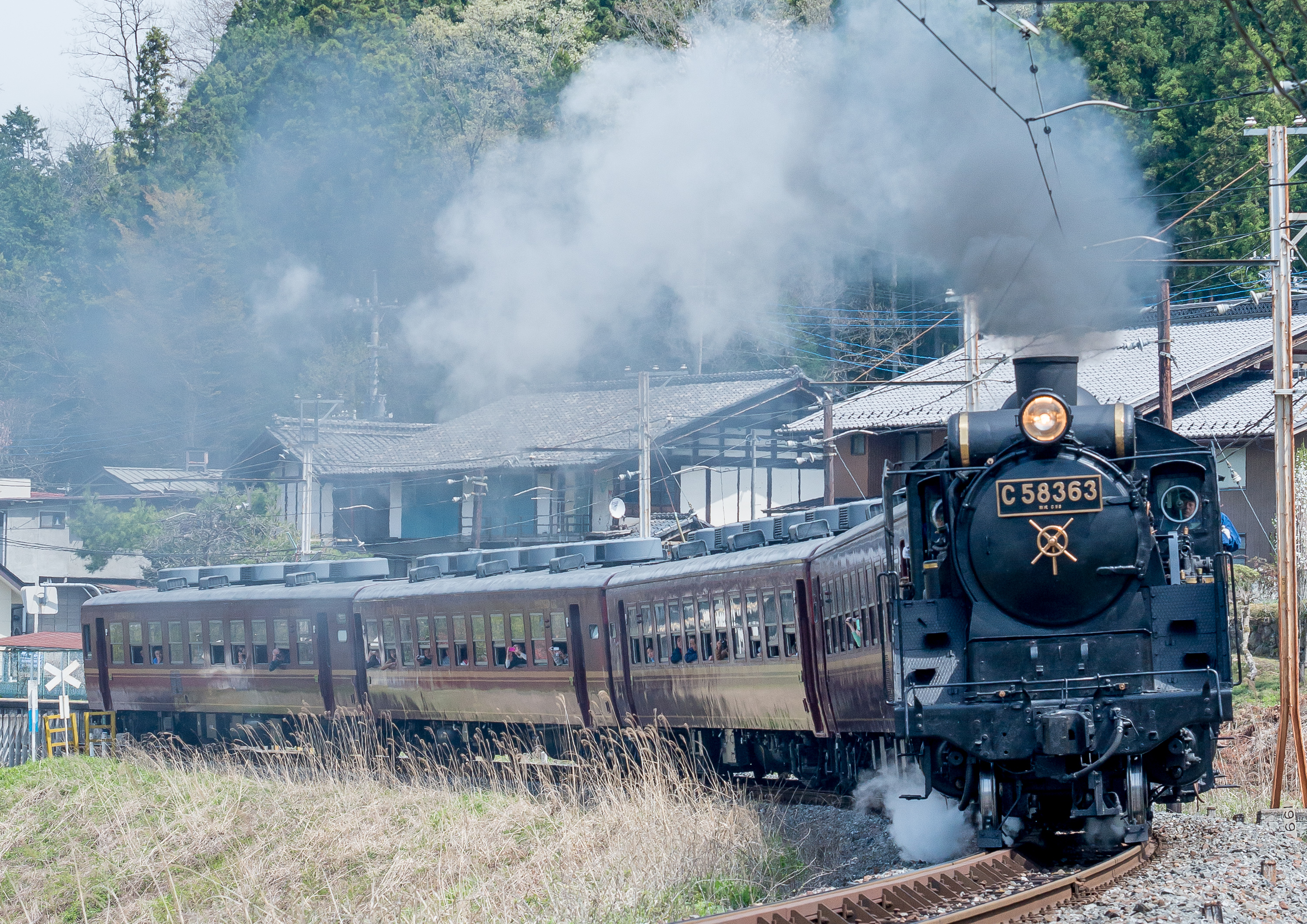
SL Paleo Express

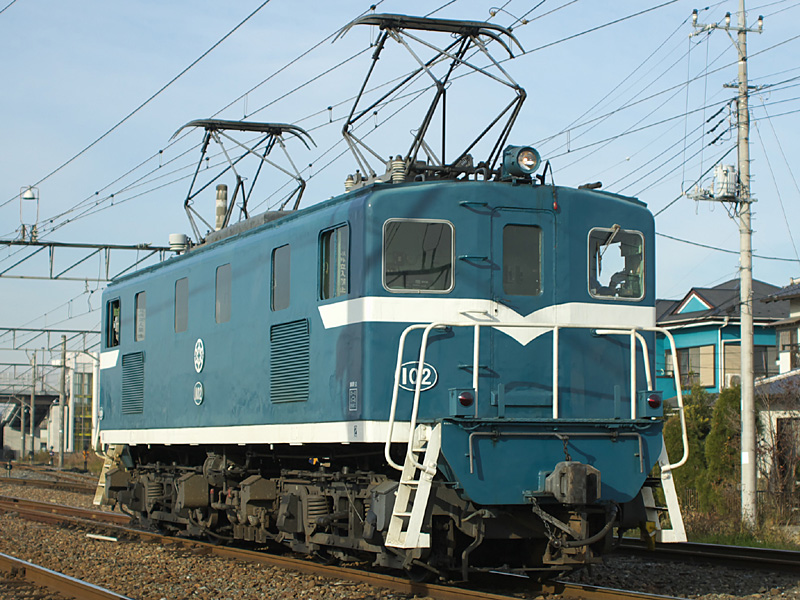
DeKi 102

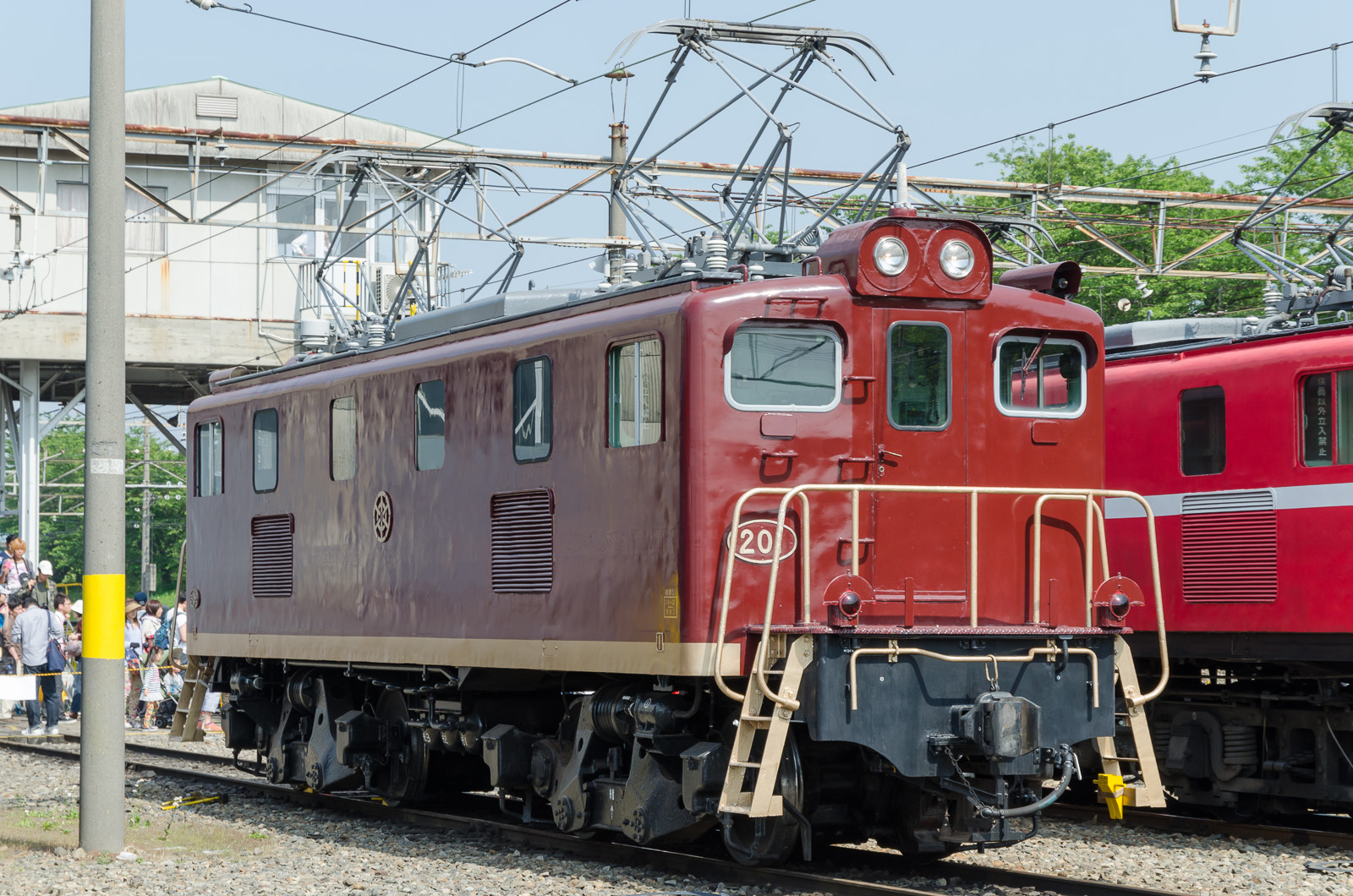
DeKi 201

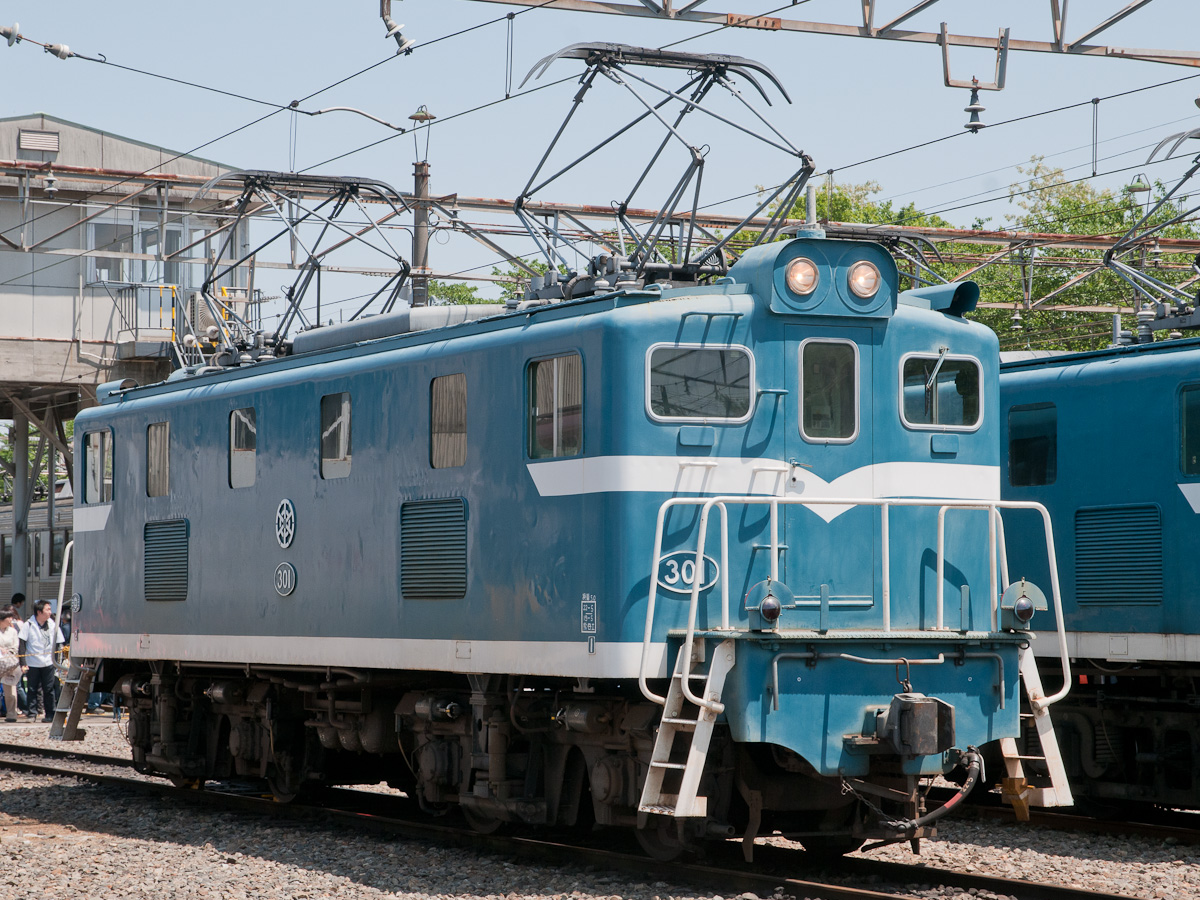
DeKi 301

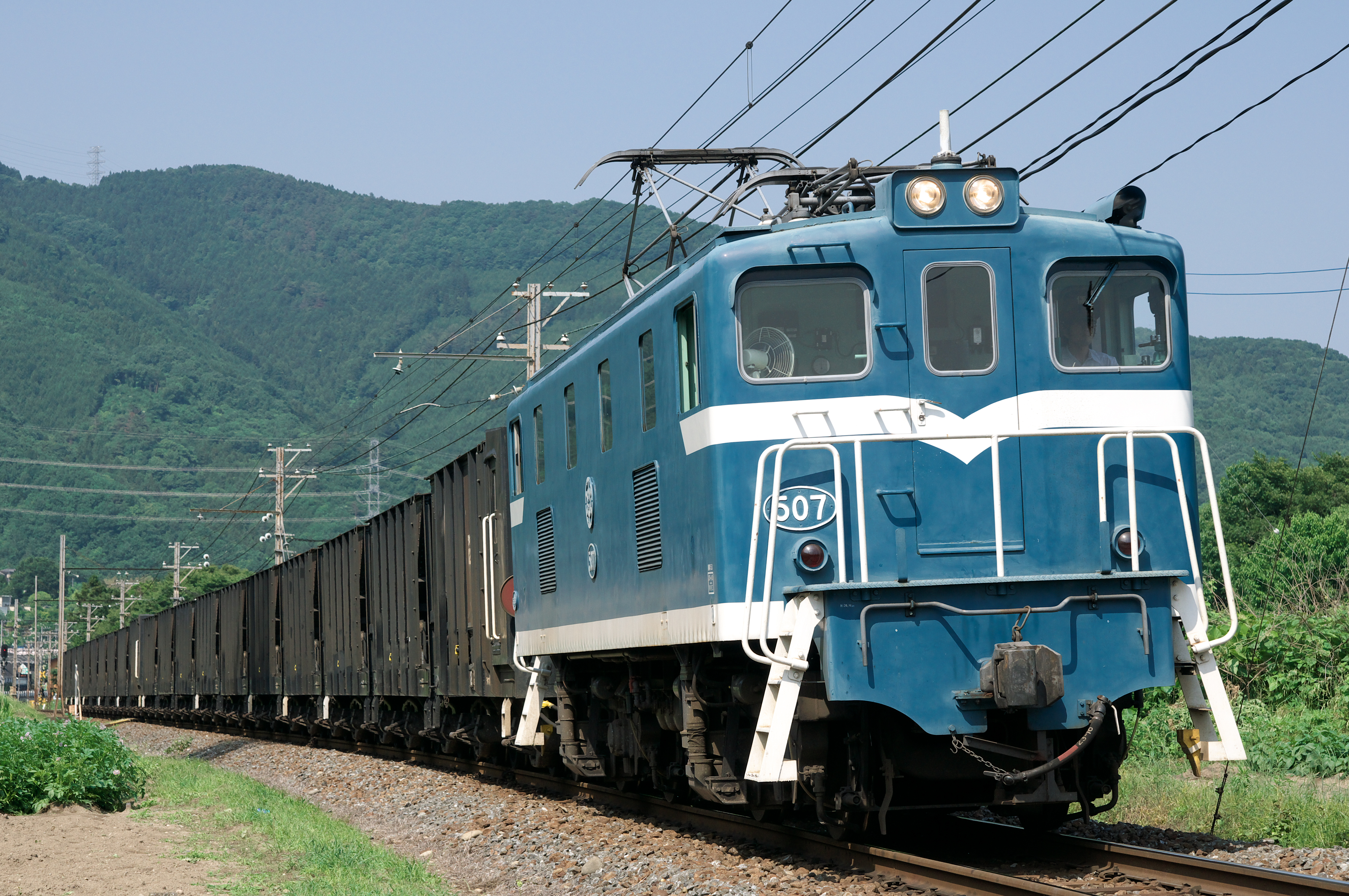
DeKi 507

=== Rolling stock previously used ===
- 300 series 2-car EMUs (from 1959 until October 1992)
- 500 series 2-car EMUs (from 1957 until March 1992)
- 800 series 2-car EMUs (formerly Odakyu 1800 series) (from 1979 until 1990)
- 1000 series 3-car EMUs (formerly JNR 101 series) (from 1986 until March 2014)
- 2000 series 4-car EMUs (formerly Tokyu 7000 series) (from 1991 until 2000)
- 3000 series 3-car EMUs x3 (formerly JR East 165 series) (from 1992 until December 2006)
- 43 series passenger coaches (for Paleo Express)
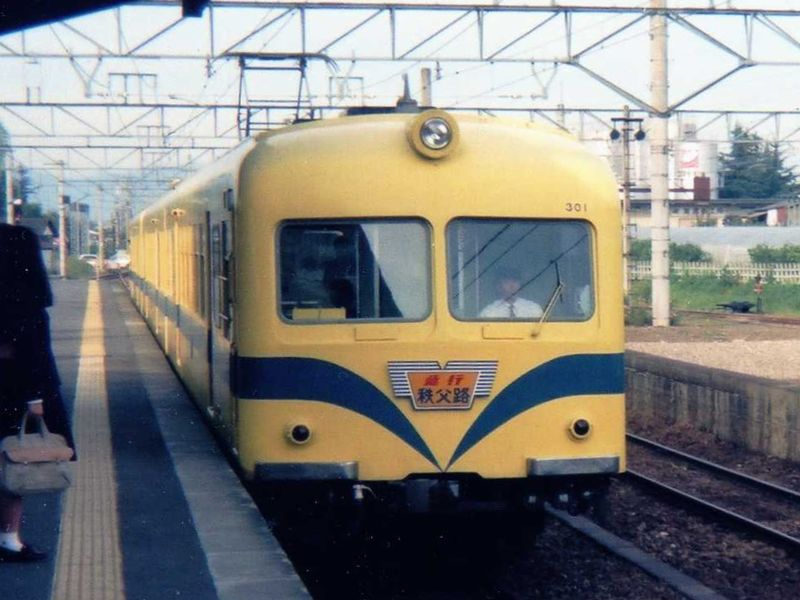
A 300 series EMU in 1989

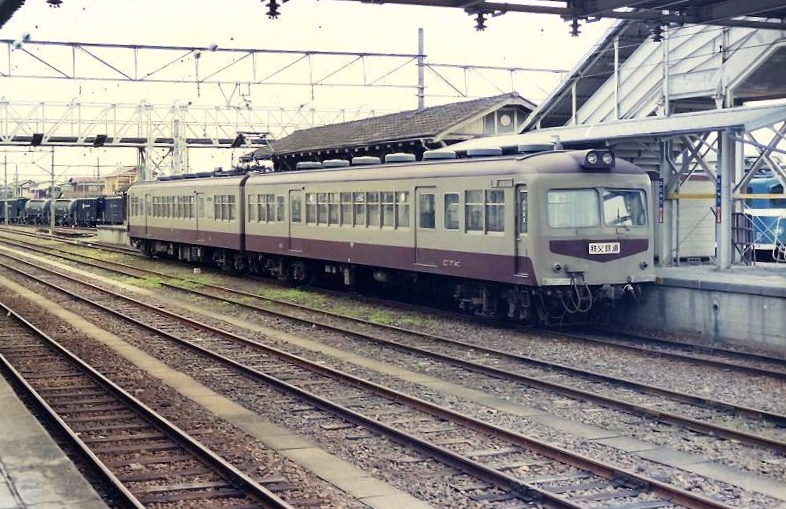
A 500 series EMU in 1984

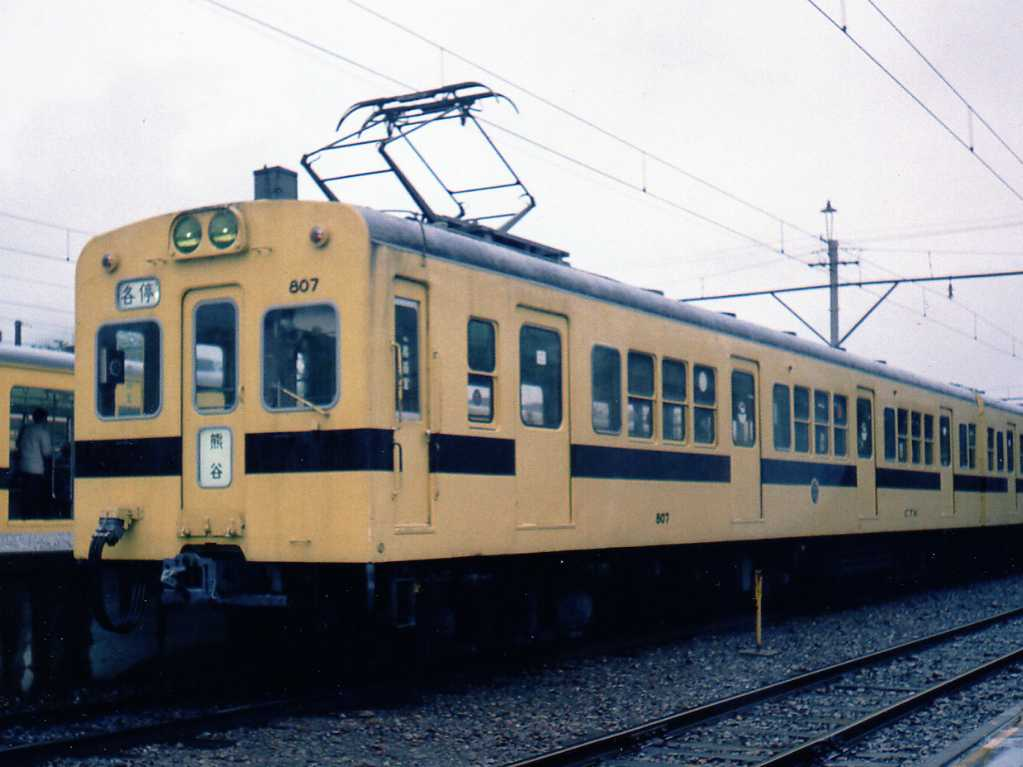
An 800 series EMU in 1989

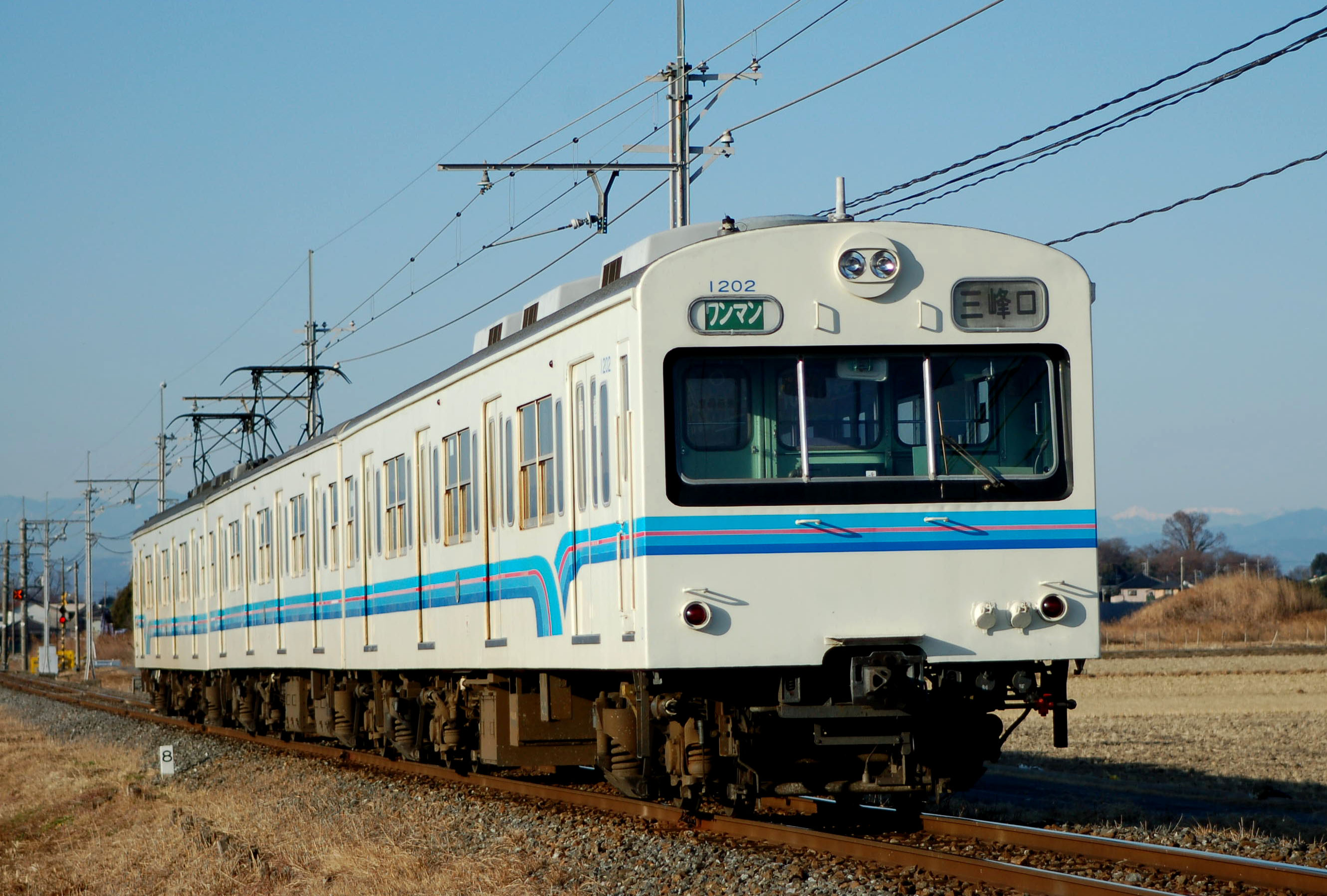
A 1000 series EMU in 2008

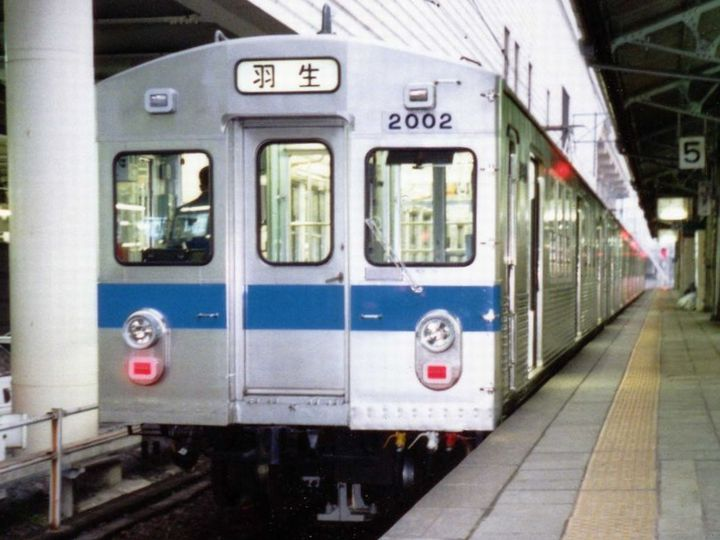
A 2000 series EMU in 1992

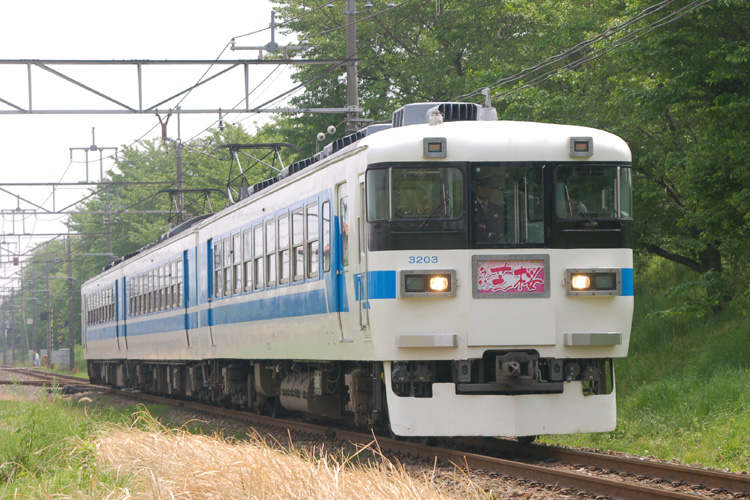
A 3000 series EMU in 2006

== History ==
The Jōbu Railway (上武鉄道) opened the section between Kumagaya and Yorii on 7 October 1901 operated by the use of steam haulage. The line was extended in stages, reaching Chichibu in 1914. The line was electrified at 1,200 V DC on 15 March 1918. On 1 August 1922, the Chichibu Railway acquired the Hokubu Railway (北武鉄道) operating between Hanyū and Kumagaya. The line reached Mitsumineguchi in 1930.

From 1 February 1952, The line voltage was raised to 1,500 V DC.

=== Former connecting lines ===
- Kumagaya Station: The Tobu Kumagaya Line operated between 1943 and 1983.
