= Chichibu Tetsudo =

Chichibu Tetsudo (秩父鉄道, -tetsudō) officially refers to:

- Chichibu Railway, a Japanese railway company

However, it is often used in discourse to mean:

- Chichibu Mainline, a railway line operated by Chichibu Railway
