= Chichibu Railway Class DeKi 500 =

Class of 7 Japanese electric locomotives

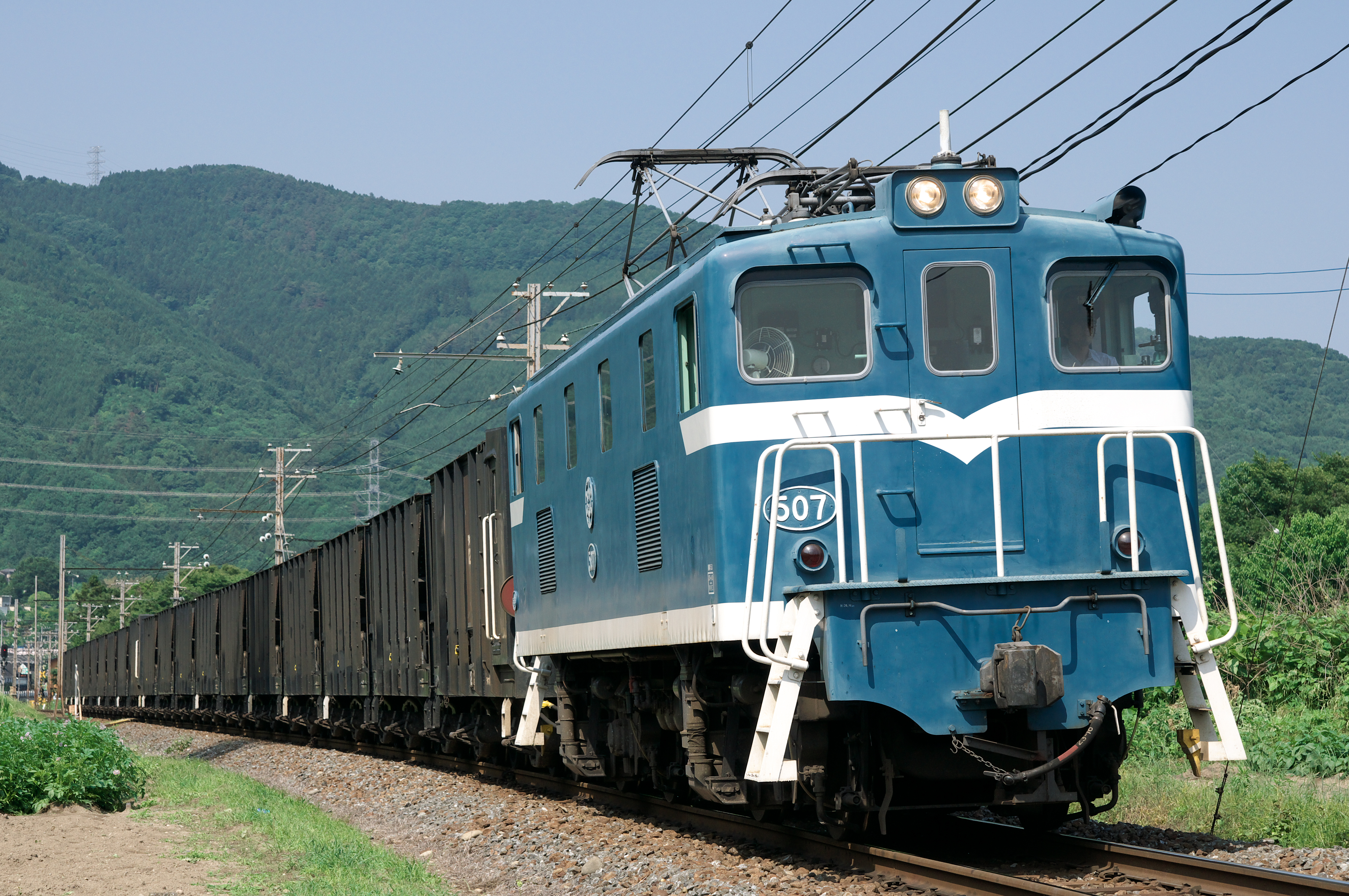
- DeKi 507 on a limestone working in June 2011
Type and origin
- Power type: Electric
- Builder: Hitachi
- Build date: 1973-1980
- Total produced: 7
Specifications
- Configuration
  - UIC: Bo-Bo
- Gauge: 1,067 mm (3 ft 6 in)
- Loco weight: 50 t
- Electric system/s: 1,500 V DC
- Current pickup: overhead wire
Performance figures
- Power output: 920 kW
Career
- Operators: Chichibu Railway
- Number in class: 7 (as of 1 April 2016)
- Numbers: DeKi 501–507
- Locale: Saitama Prefecture
- Disposition: Operational

The Chichibu Railway Class DeKi 500 (秩父鉄道デキ500形) is a Bo-Bo wheel arrangement DC electric locomotive type operated by the private railway operator Chichibu Railway in Saitama Prefecture, Japan, primarily on freight services, since 1973.

As of 1 April 2016, all of the original seven locomotives are in operation.

== History ==
The first two locomotives, DeKi 501 and 502, were built in 1973, based on the earlier Class DeKi 300 design. These locomotives were finished in then-standard blue Chichibu Railway livery from new, as opposed to the brown livery initially carried by earlier classes. Locomotives DeKi 503 and 504 were delivered in March 1979 ahead of the opening of the Mikajiru Freight Line in October of the same year. These locomotives had larger cab end windows and sunvisors above the cab windows. The last three locomotives of the class, DeKi 505 to 507 were delivered in 1980. DeKi 507 is unique among the class in being privately owned by Taiheiyo Cement, and its introduction in 1980 allowed the similarly privately owned DeKi 101 to be transferred to Chichibu Railway ownership.

== Fleet details ==
Number	Manufacturer	Year built	Year withdrawn	Notes
DeKi 501	Hitachi	1973		
DeKi 502	Hitachi	1973		
DeKi 503	Hitachi	1979		
DeKi 504	Hitachi	1979		
DeKi 505	Hitachi	1980		Repainted into brown livery in May 2010
DeKi 506	Hitachi	1980		
DeKi 507	Hitachi	1980		Privately owned by Taiheiyo Cement

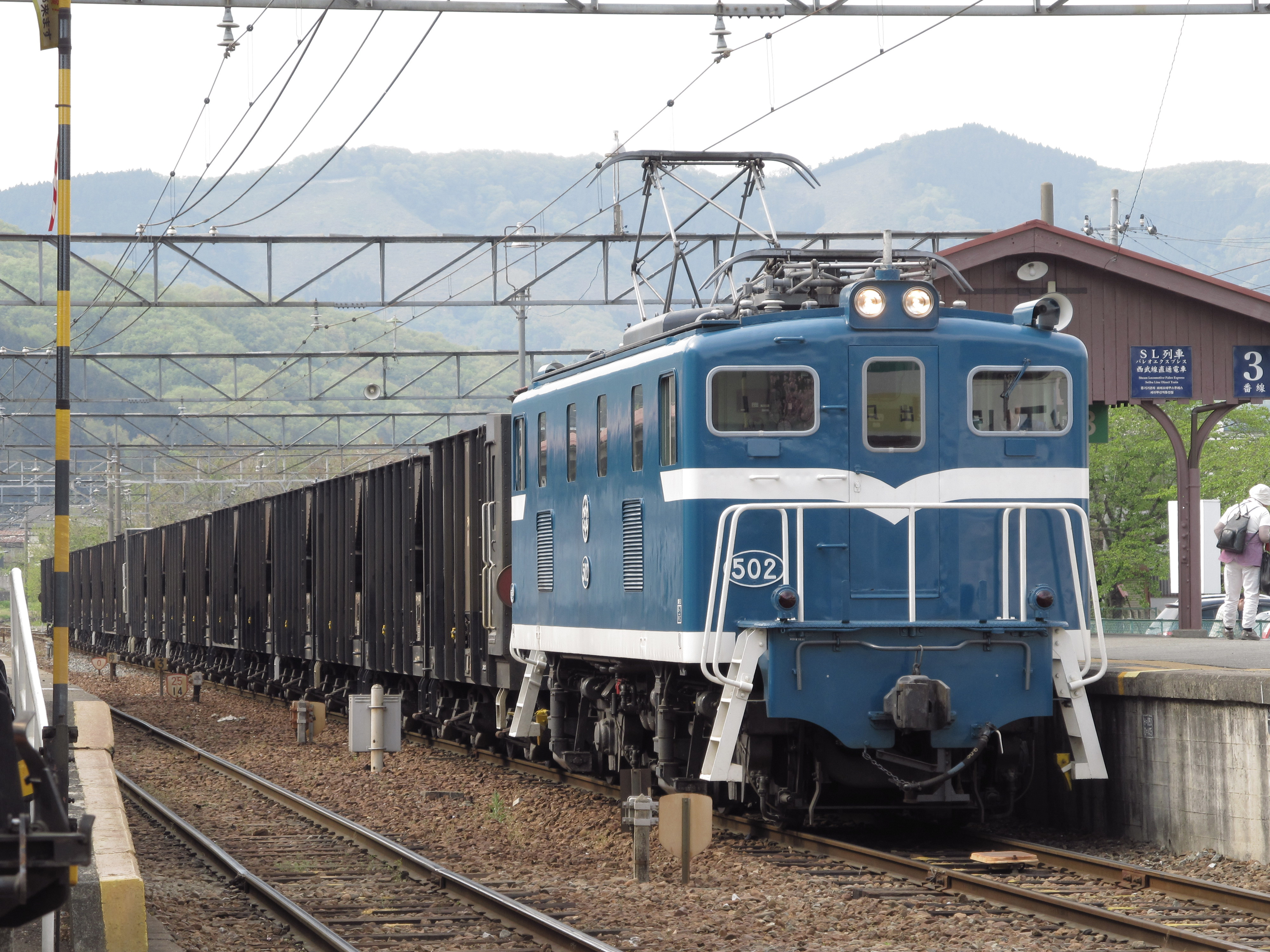
DeKi 502 in April 2014

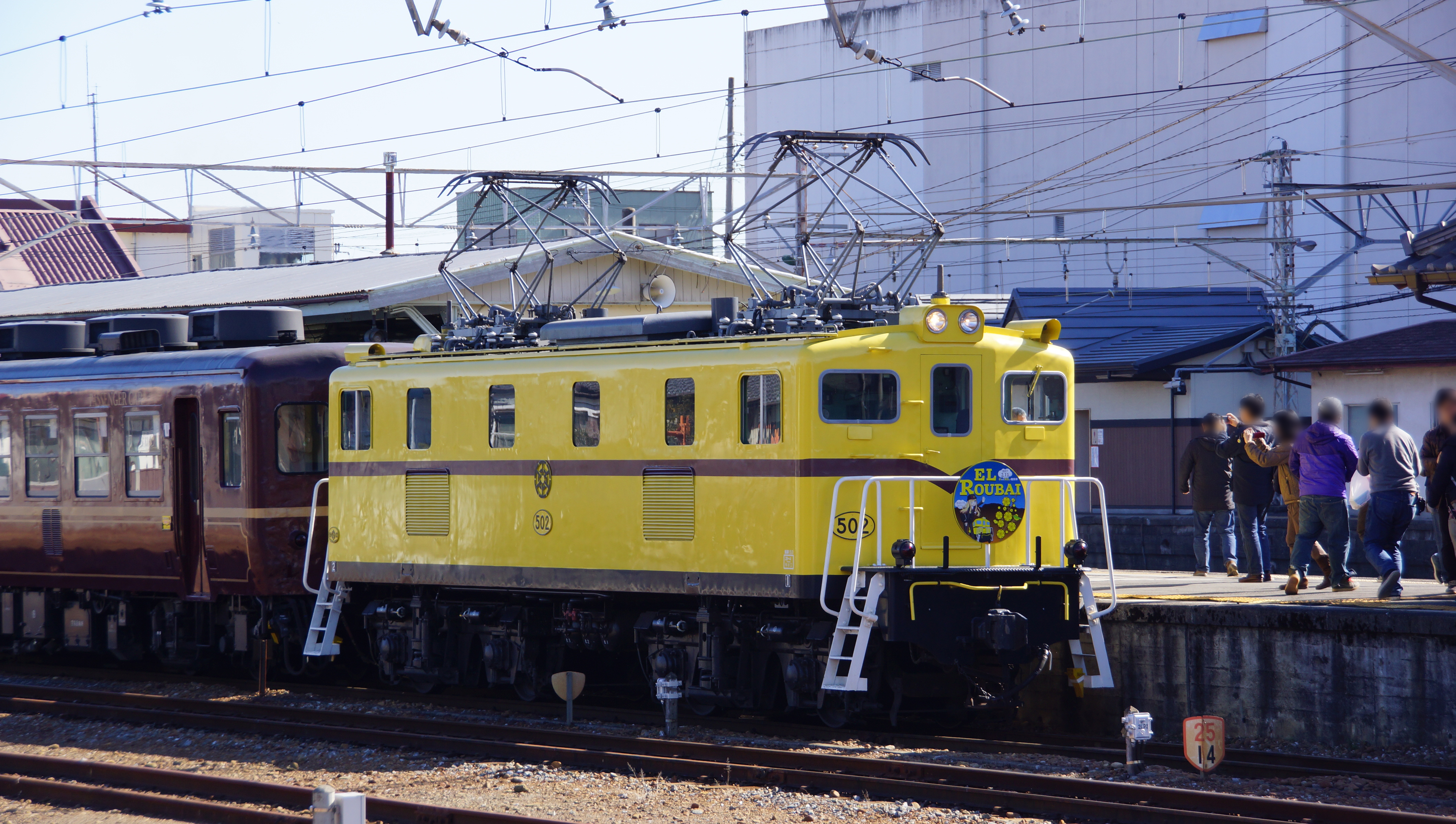
DeKi 502 in yellow livery in February 2017

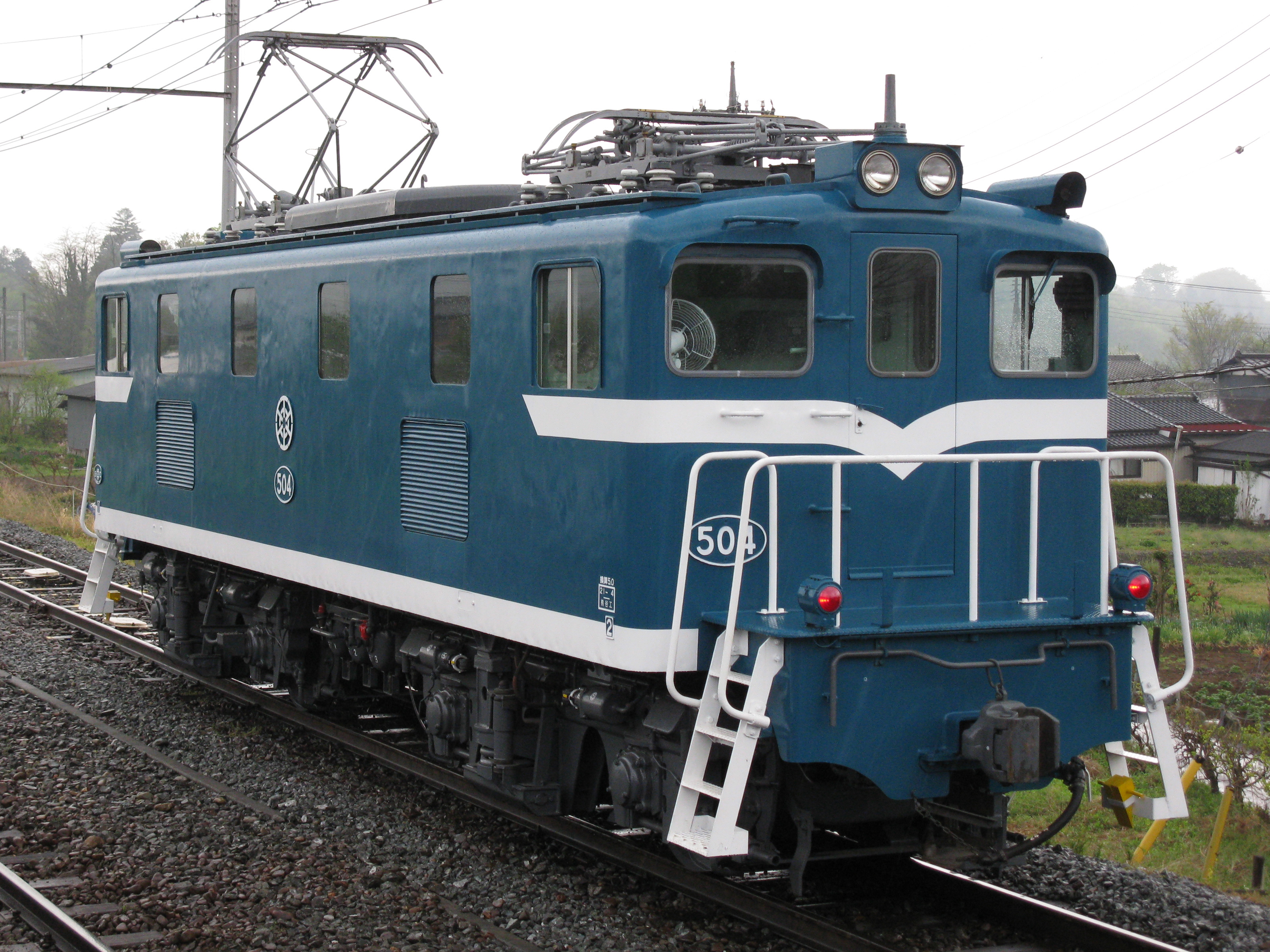
DeKi 504 in April 2009

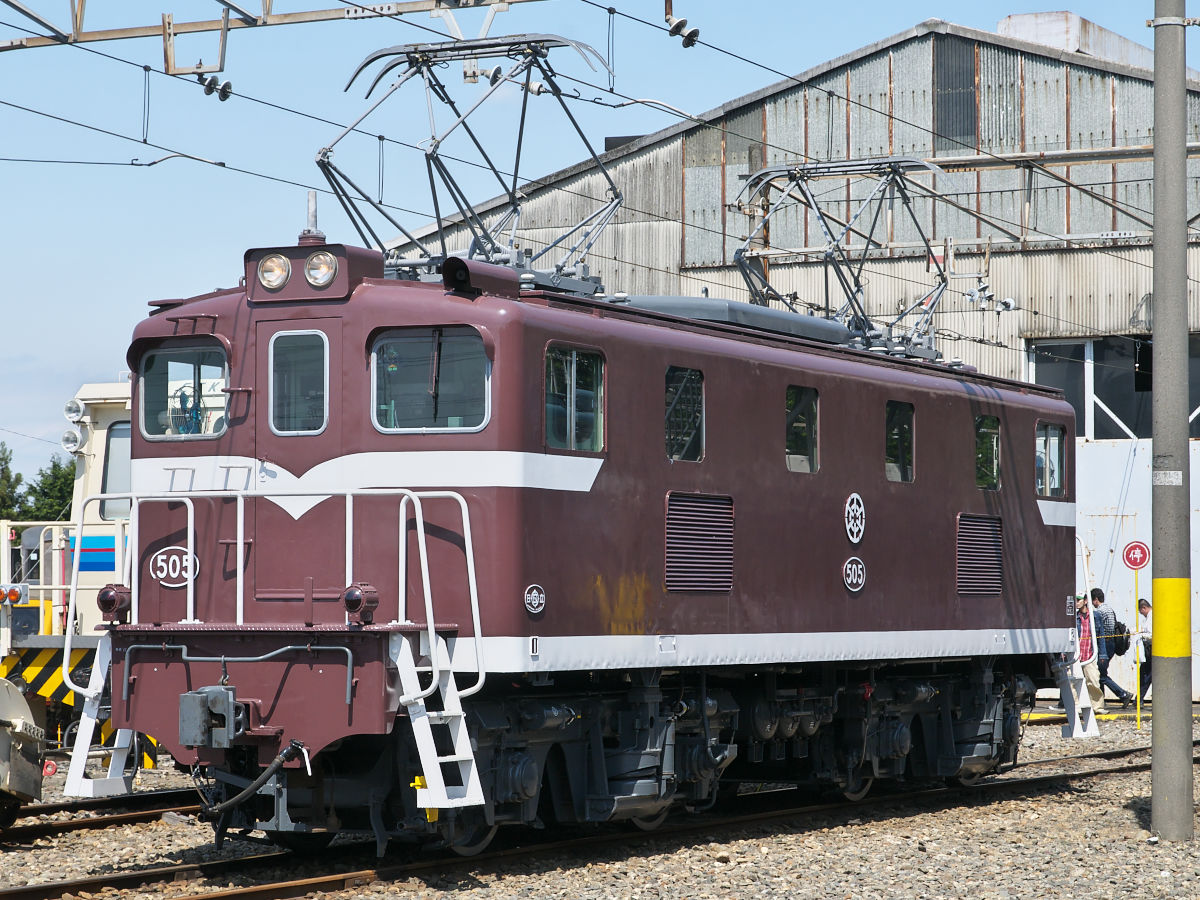
DeKi 505 in brown livery in May 2010

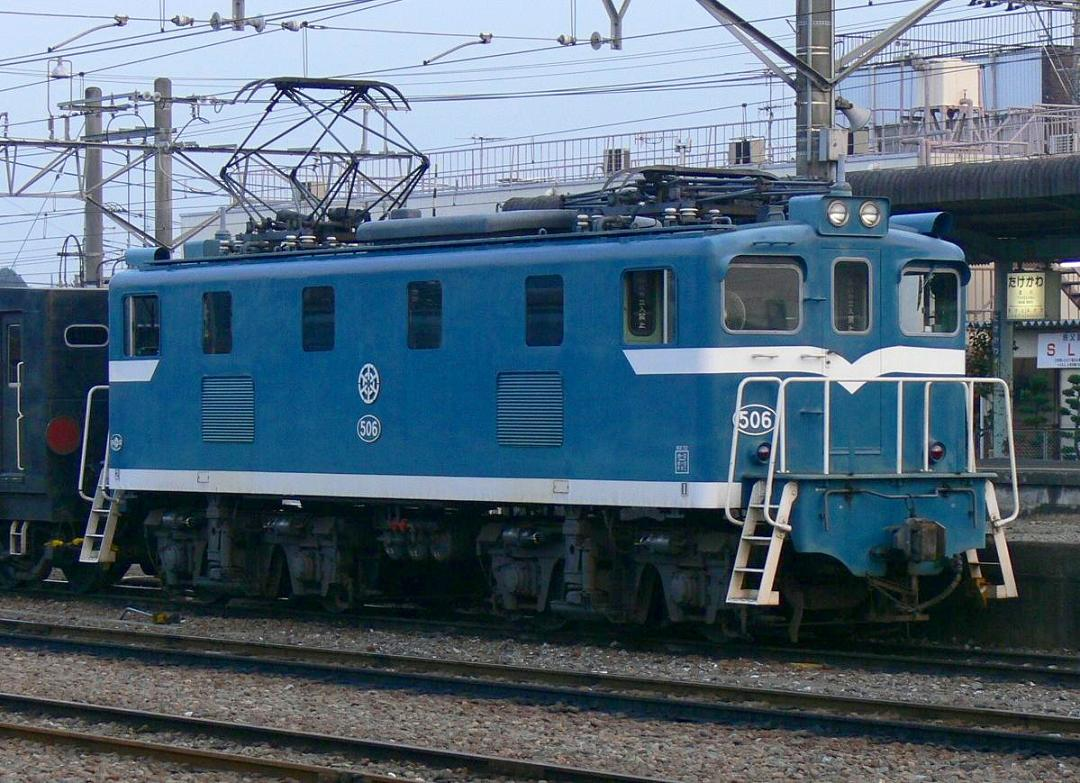
DeKi 506 in October 2006

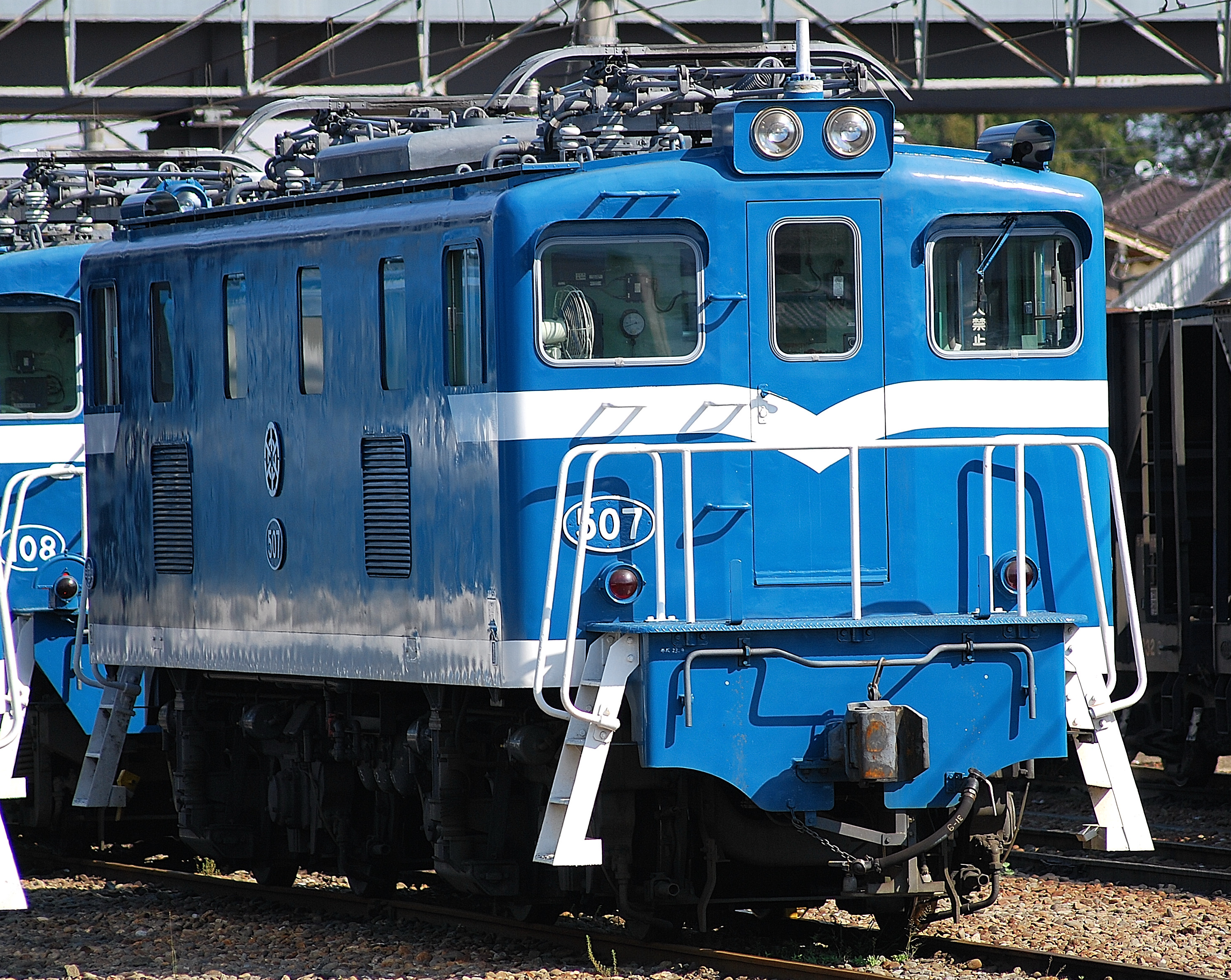
DeKi 507 in October 2012
