= Chichibu Railway 7000 series =

Class of 2 Japanese 3-car electric multiple units

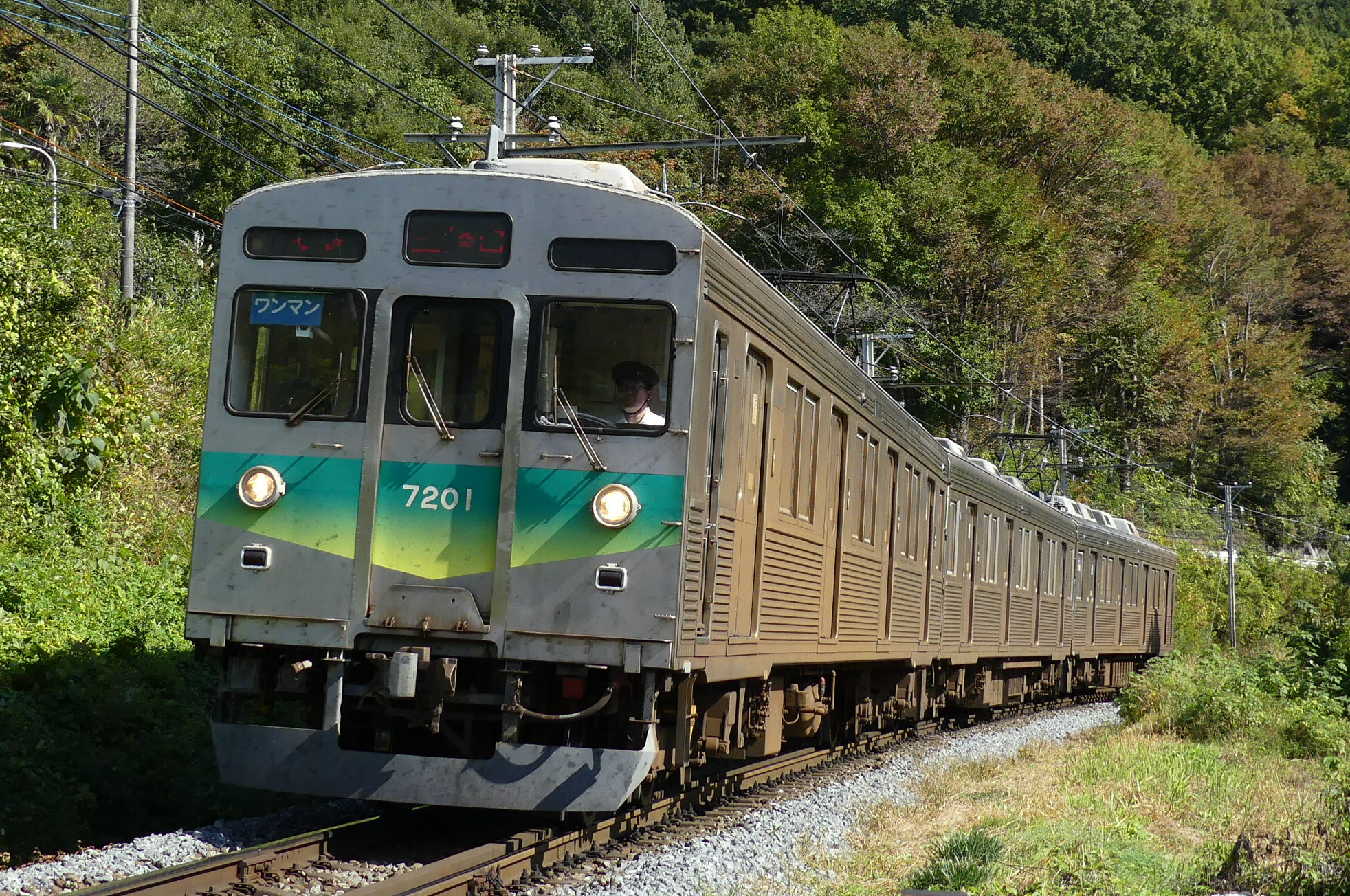
- First Chichibu 7000 series set, October 2018
- In service: March 2009–
- Manufacturer: Tokyu Car Corporation
- Number built: 6 vehicles (2 sets)
- Number in service: 6 vehicles (2 sets)
- Formation: 3 cars per trainset
- Capacity: 423
- Operator: Chichibu Railway
- Depot: Kumagaya
- Line served: Chichibu Main Line

Specifications
- Car body construction: Stainless steel
- Car length: 20,000 mm (65 ft 7 in)
- Width: 2,835 mm (9 ft 3.6 in)
- Doors: 4 pairs per side
- Maximum speed: 80 km/h (50 mph)
- Power output: 1,040 kW (130 kW x 8)
- Electric system: 1,500 V DC
- Current collection: Overhead wire
- Safety system: ATS
- Track gauge: 1,067 mm (3 ft 6 in)

The Chichibu Railway 7000 series (秩父鉄道7000系) is an electric multiple unit (EMU) train type for local services on the Chichibu Main Line operated by the private railway operator Chichibu Railway in Japan since March 2009.

== Details ==
Two 3-car trains were converted from former Tokyu 8500 series cars, and entered service from 26 March 2009. The end cars of the second set, 7002, were modified from former intermediate cars with the addition of new driving cabs.

== Formation ==
| DeHa (M1c) | SaHa (T) | DeHa (M2c) |
|---|---|---|
| 7001 (ex DeHa 8509) | 7101 (ex SaHa 8950) | 7201 (ex DeHa 8609) |
| 7002 (ex DeHa 8709) | 7102 (ex SaHa 8926) | 7202 (ex DeHa 8809) |

The DeHa 7000 and 7200 cars are each fitted with one lozenge-type pantograph.
