= Chichibu Railway 800 series =

Class of 9 Japanese 2-car electric multiple units

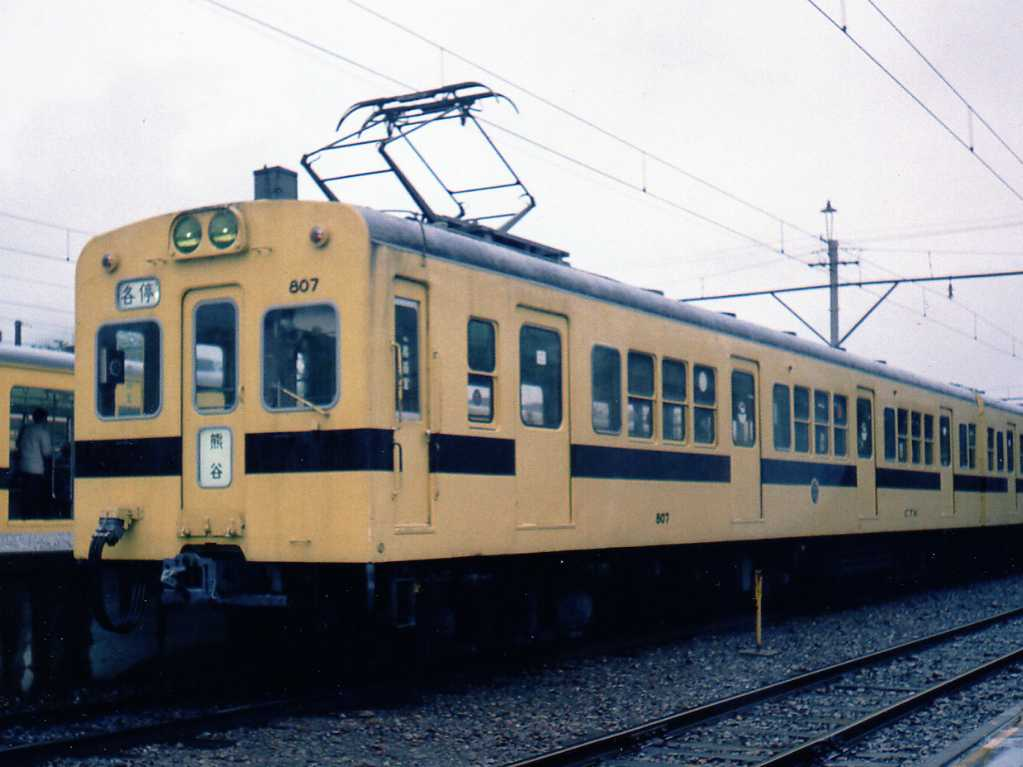
- 800 series at Mitsumineguchi Station, 1989
- In service: 1979–1990
- Replaced: 100 series
- Scrapped: 1990
- Number built: 18 vehicles (9 sets)
- Number preserved: 1 vehicle
- Number scrapped: 17 vehicles
- Formation: 2 cars per trainset
- Operator: Chichibu Railway
- Line served: Chichibu Main Line

Specifications
- Car body construction: Steel
- Car length: 20 m (65 ft 7 in)
- Doors: 4 per side
- Electric system: 1,500 V DC
- Current collection: Overhead wire
- Track gauge: 1,067 mm

The Chichibu Railway 800 series (秩父鉄道800系) was an electric multiple unit (EMU) train type for local services operated by Chichibu Railway in Japan from 1979 to 1990.

== Formations ==
DeHa	KuHa
801 (ex DeHa 1801)	851 (ex KuHa 1851)
802 (ex DeHa 1802)	852 (ex KuHa 1852)
803 (ex DeHa 1803)	853 (ex KuHa 1853)
804 (ex DeHa 1804)	854 (ex KuHa 1854)
805 (ex DeHa 1805)	855 (ex KuHa 1855)
807 (ex DeHa 1807)	857 (ex KuHa 1857)
808 (ex DeHa 1808)	858 (ex KuHa 1858)
809 (ex DeHa 1809)	859 (ex KuHa 1859)
810 (ex DeHa 1810)	860 (ex KuHa 1860)

Cars DeHa 806 and KuHa 856 were used as sources of spare parts and were scrapped without entering service.

== History ==
Nine 2-car trains were converted in 1979 from former Odakyu 1800 series commuter EMUs. The trains were replaced by 1000 series EMUs from 1989 and withdrawn by 1990.

== Preservation ==
As of December 2018, DeHa 801 remains at a farmhouse near Mount Akagi, Shibukawa city, Gunma.

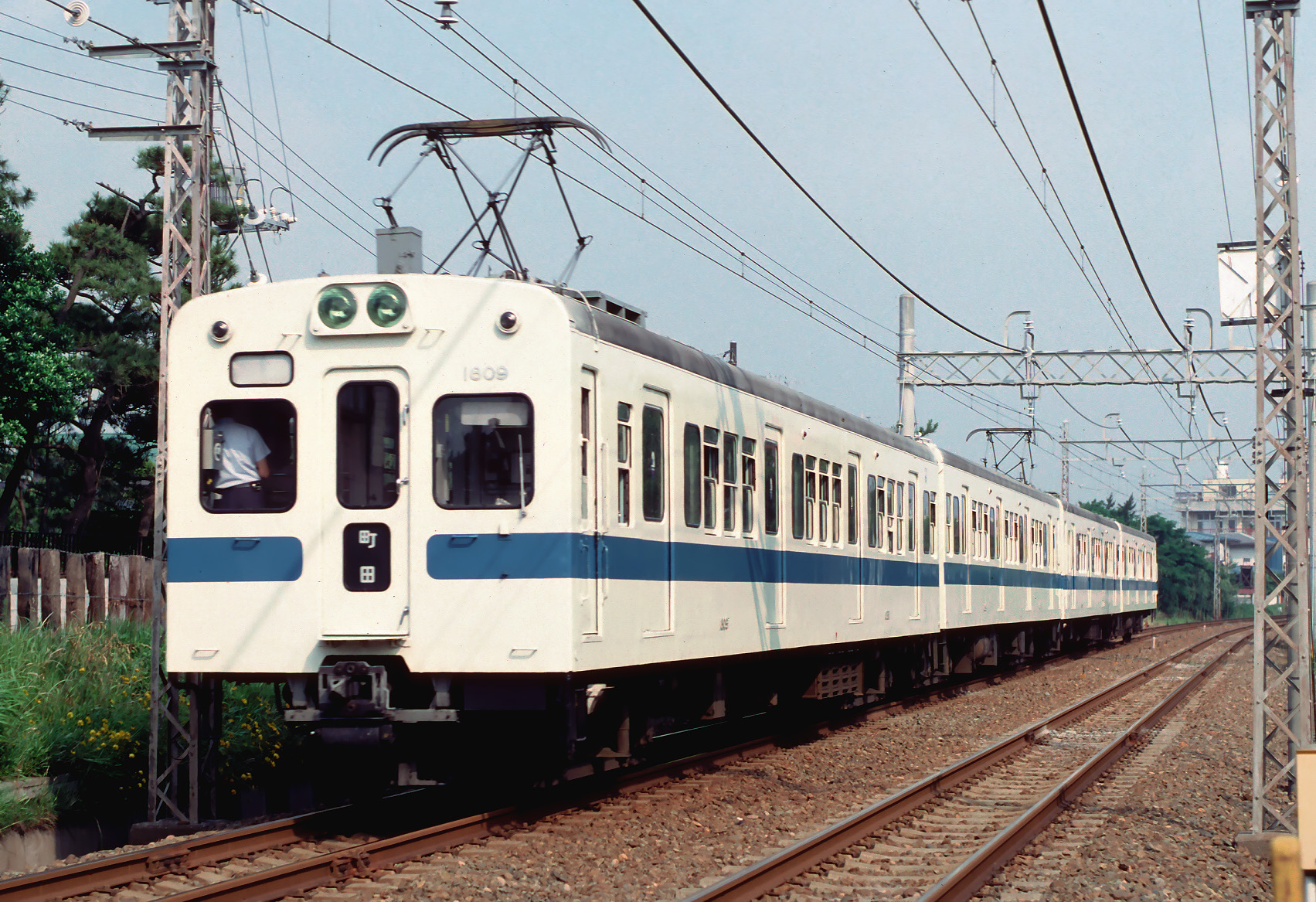
Odakyu 1800 series EMU in 1981

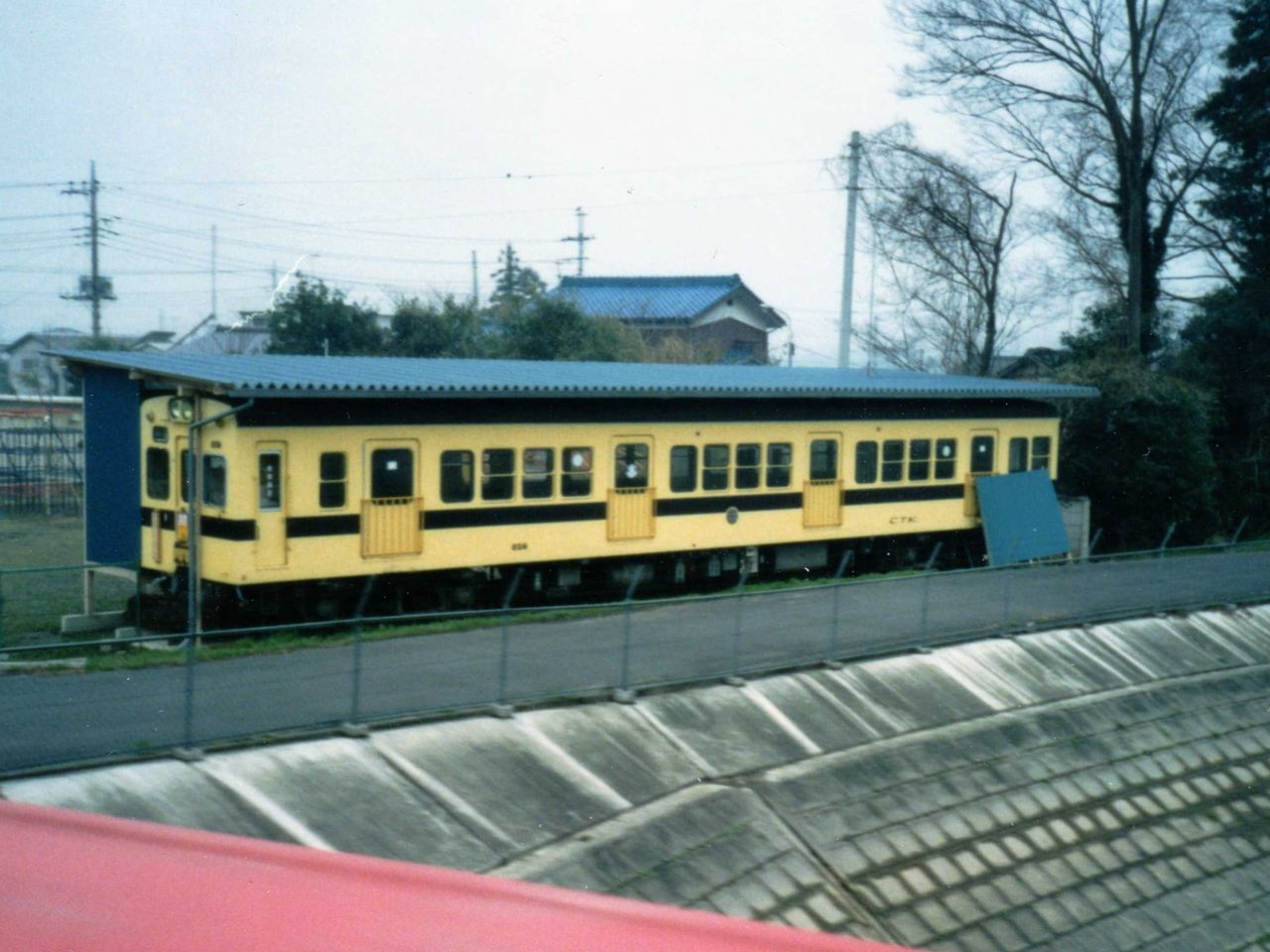
Preserved 800 series car near Bushu-Araki Station in 1992
