= Chichibu Railway Class DeKi 300 =

Class of 3 Japanese electric locomotives

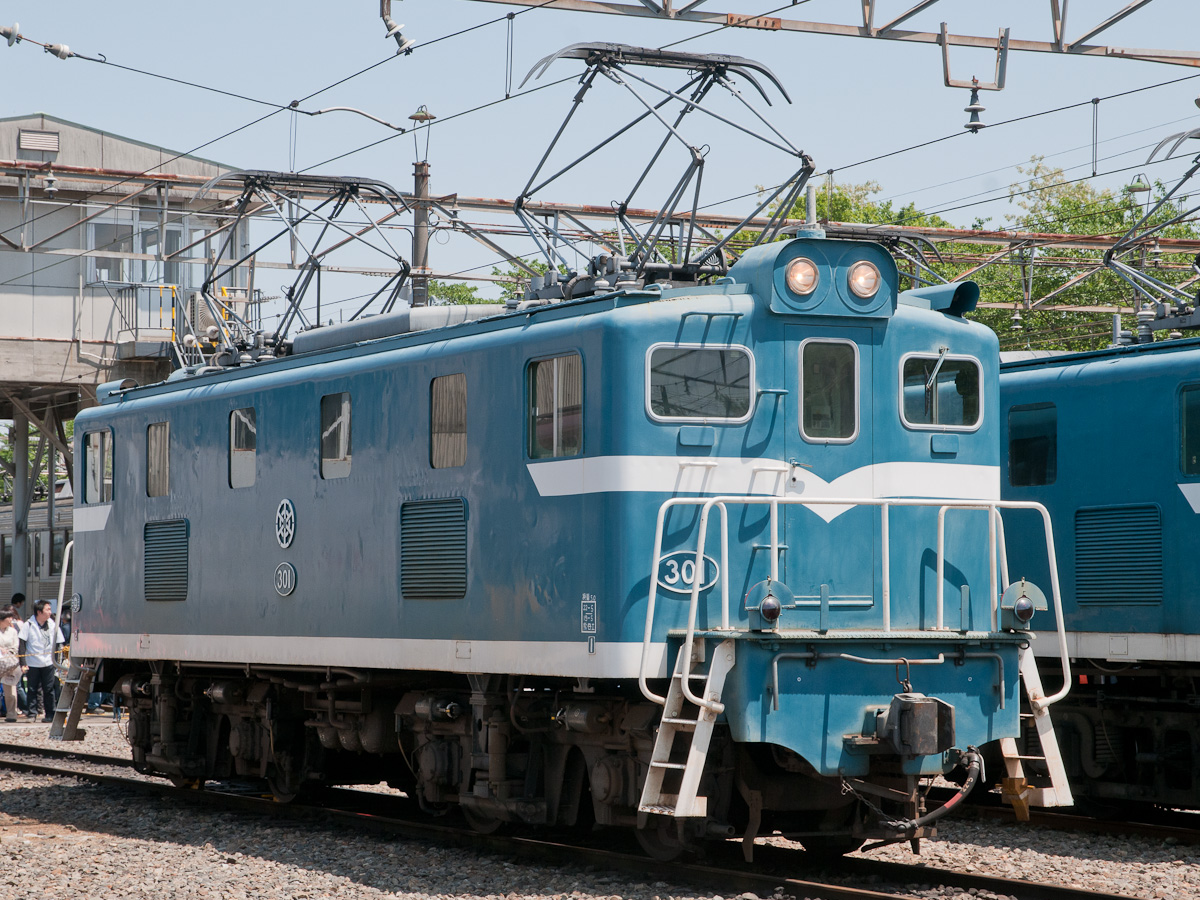
- DeKi 301 in May 2010
Type and origin
- Power type: Electric
- Builder: Hitachi
- Build date: 1967
- Total produced: 3
Specifications
- Configuration
  - UIC: Bo-Bo
- Gauge: 1,067 mm (3 ft 6 in)
- Loco weight: 50 t
- Electric system/s: 1,500 V DC
- Current pickup: overhead wire
- Train heating: None
Performance figures
- Power output: 920 kW
Career
- Operators: Chichibu Railway
- Number in class: 3 (as of 1 April 2016)
- Numbers: DeKi 301–303
- Locale: Saitama Prefecture
- Disposition: Operational

The Chichibu Railway Class DeKi 300 (秩父鉄道デキ300形) is a Bo-Bo wheel arrangement DC electric locomotive type operated by the private railway operator Chichibu Railway in Saitama Prefecture, Japan, primarily on freight services, since 1967.

As of 1 April 2016, all of the original three locomotives are in operation.

== History ==
Three locomotives, DeKi 301 to 303, were built in 1967. The design was broadly based on the earlier Class DeKi 200 locomotives, with four 230 kW traction motors, although the non-standard bogie design of the DeKi 200 was not used. The cab window sun visors of the DeKi 200 were also discontinued on the DeKi 300.

== Fleet details ==
Number	Manufacturer	Year built	Year withdrawn	Notes
DeKi 301	Hitachi	1967		
DeKi 302	Hitachi	1967		
DeKi 303	Hitachi	1967		

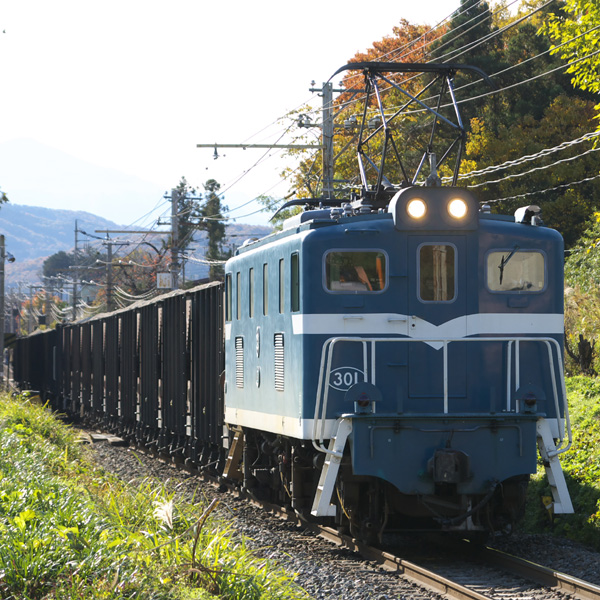
DeKi 301 in November 2006

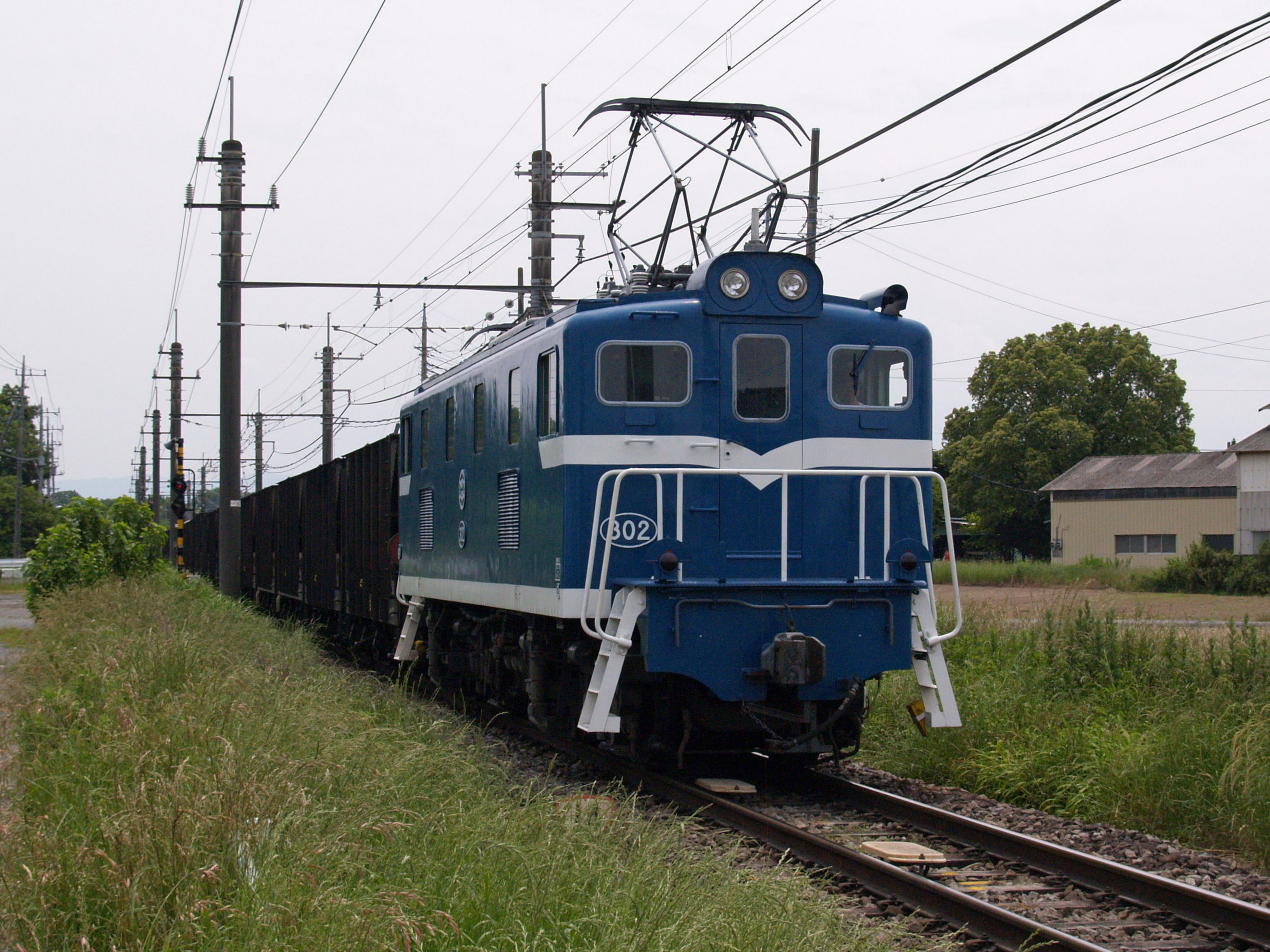
DeKi 302 in June 2012

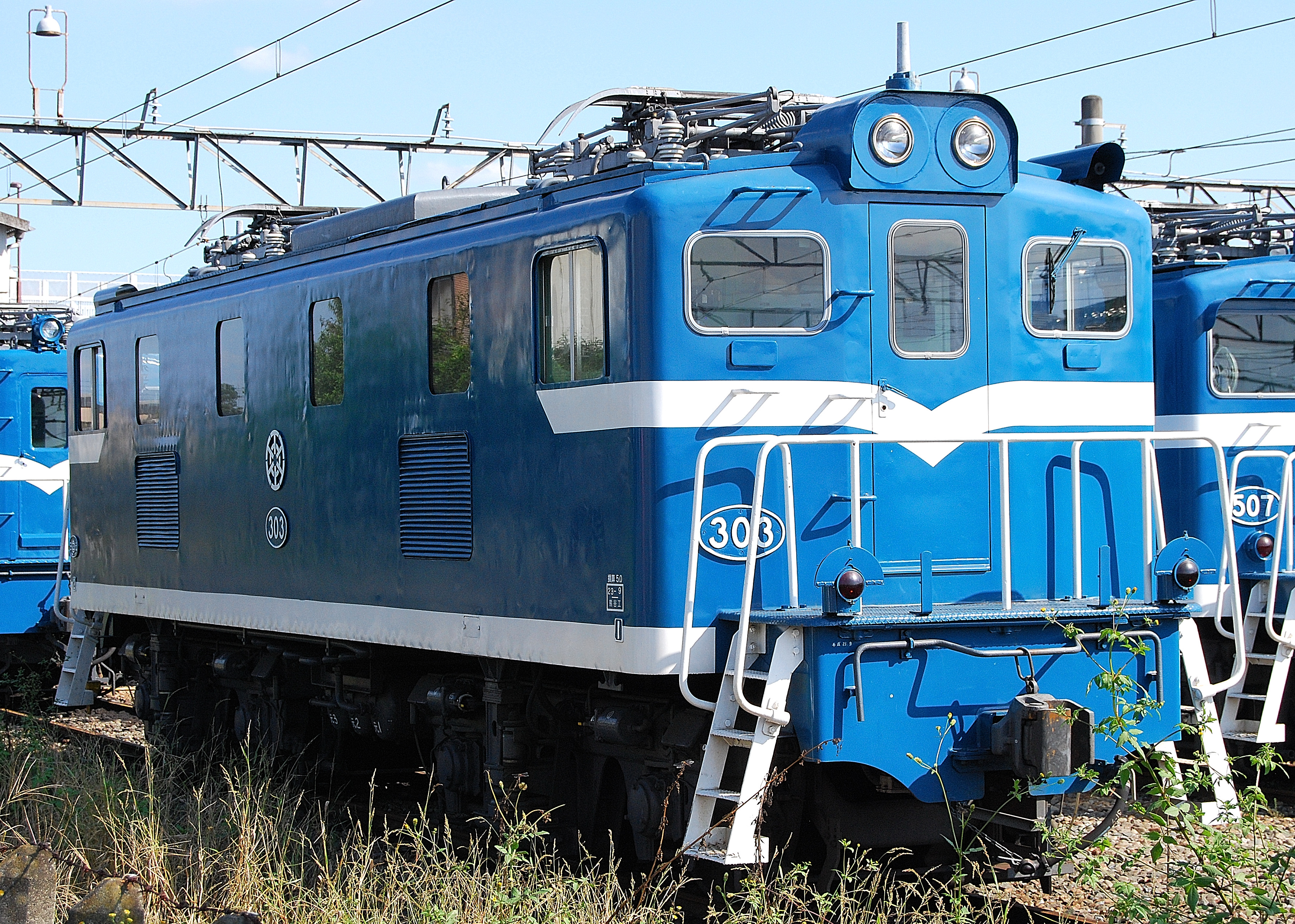
DeKi 303 in October 2012
