= Chichibu Railway Class DeKi 200 =

Class of 3 Japanese electric locomotives

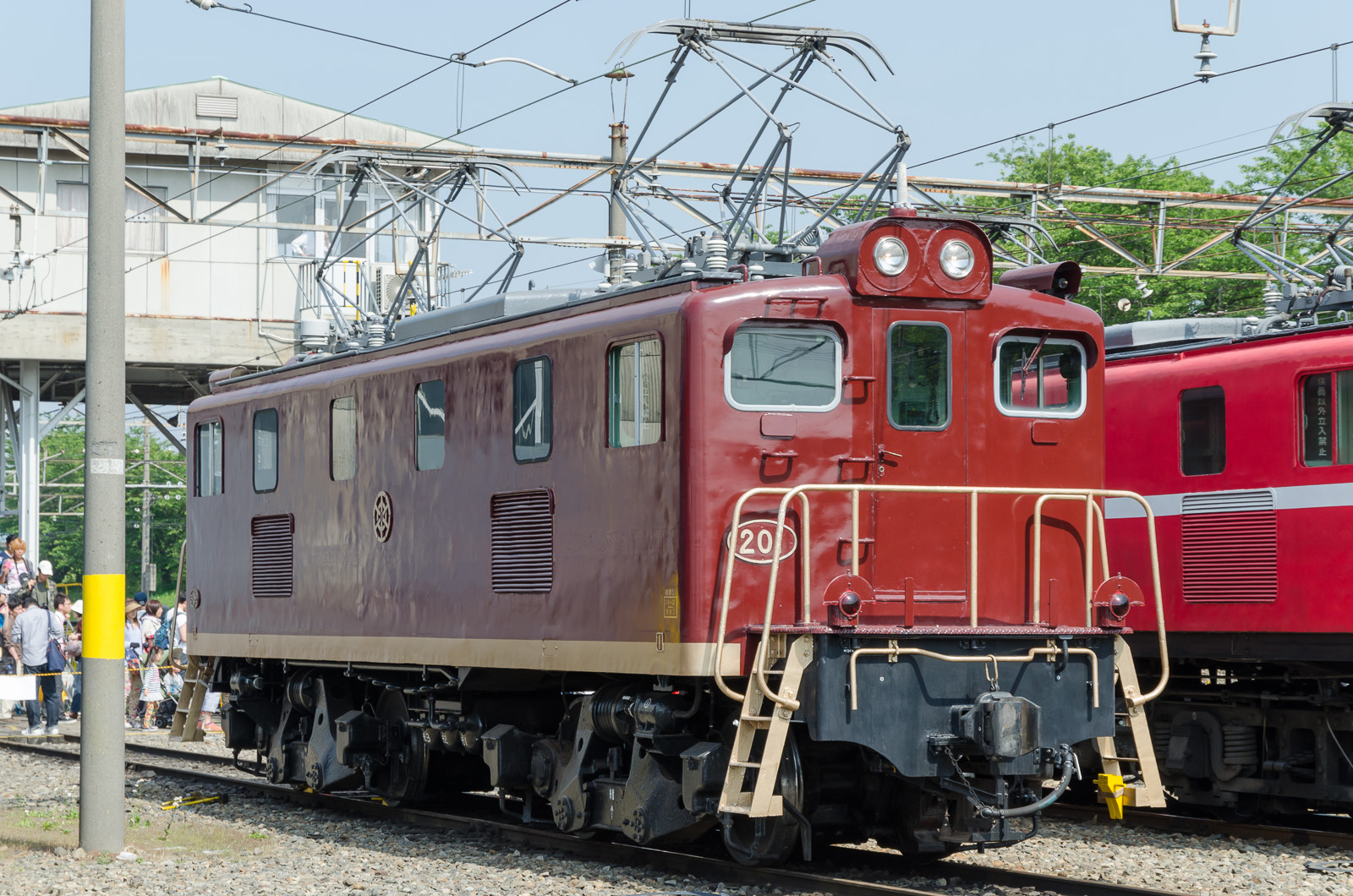
- DeKi 201 in revised Paleo Express livery, May 2013
Type and origin
- Power type: Electric
- Builder: Hitachi
- Build date: 1963
- Total produced: 3
Specifications
- Configuration
  - UIC: Bo-Bo
- Gauge: 1,067 mm (3 ft 6 in)
- Loco weight: 50 t
- Electric system/s: 1,500 V DC
- Current pickup: overhead wire
Performance figures
- Power output: 920 kW
Career
- Operators: Chichibu Railway
- Number in class: 1
- Numbers: DeKi 201–203
- Locale: Saitama Prefecture
- Disposition: Operational

The Chichibu Railway Class DeKi 200 (秩父鉄道デキ200形) is a Bo-Bo wheel arrangement DC electric locomotive type operated by the private railway operator Chichibu Railway in Saitama Prefecture, Japan, since 1963.

As of 1 April 2014, one (DeKi 201) out of the original three locomotives is in operation. The locomotive is painted in a brown livery with gold lining, and is primarily used as an assisting locomotive on steam-hauled SL Paleo Express services and on empty stock movements.

== History ==
Three locomotives, DeKi 201 to 203, were built in 1963 to provide additional capacity hauling limestone trains on the Chichibu Main Line. The design was broadly based on the earlier Class DeKi 100 locomotives, with four 230 kW traction motors instead of the earlier 200 kW motors.

== Fleet details ==
Number	Manufacturer	Year built	Year withdrawn	Notes
DeKi 201	Hitachi	1963		
DeKi 202	Hitachi	1963	2000	Resold to Sangi Railway
DeKi 203	Hitachi	1963	2000	Resold to Sangi Railway

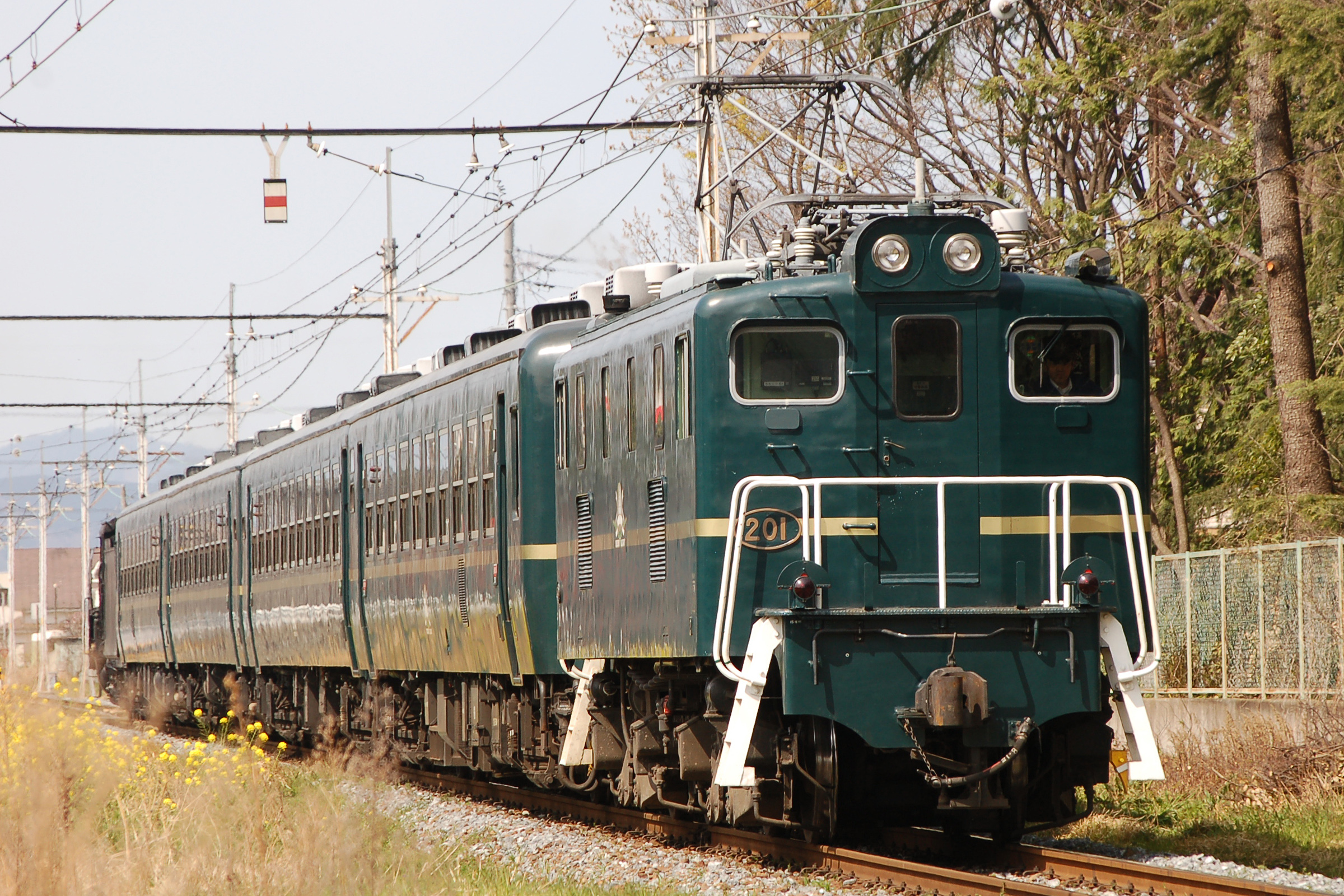
DeKi 201 in earlier Paleo Express dark green livery in April 2006

== Resale ==
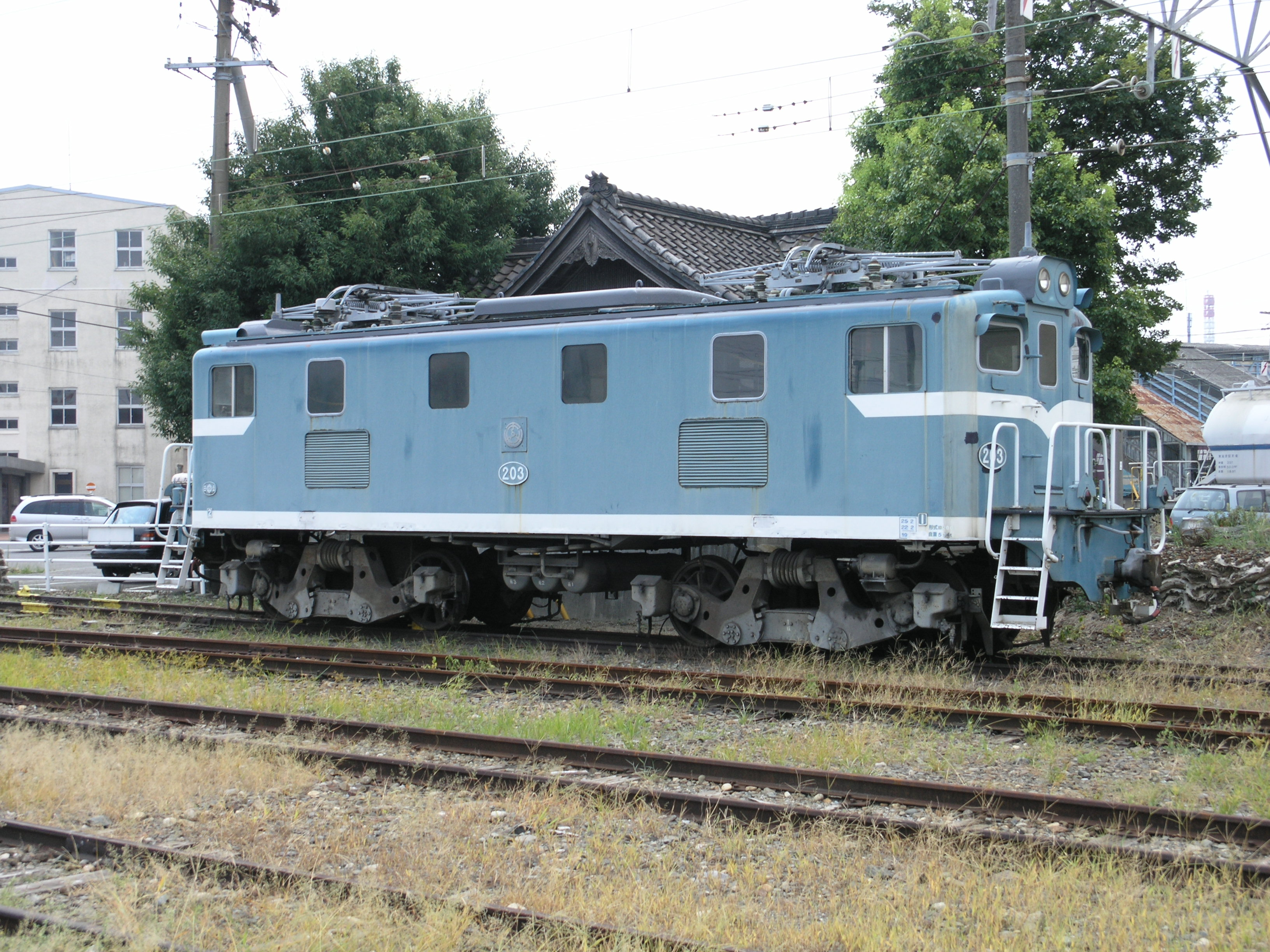
DeKi 203 on the Sangi Railway, August 2008

In July 2000, two Class DeKi 200 locomotives, DeKi 202 and 203 were sold to the Sangi Railway in Mie Prefecture, where they were used to haul trains of landfill during construction of the Chūbu Centrair International Airport. The lack of ATS equipment meant that the locomotives could not run on the main line, and were finally withdrawn in March 2011.
