= Nagata Station (Saitama) =

Railway station in Fukaya, Saitama Prefecture, Japan

CR16 Nagata Station 永田駅
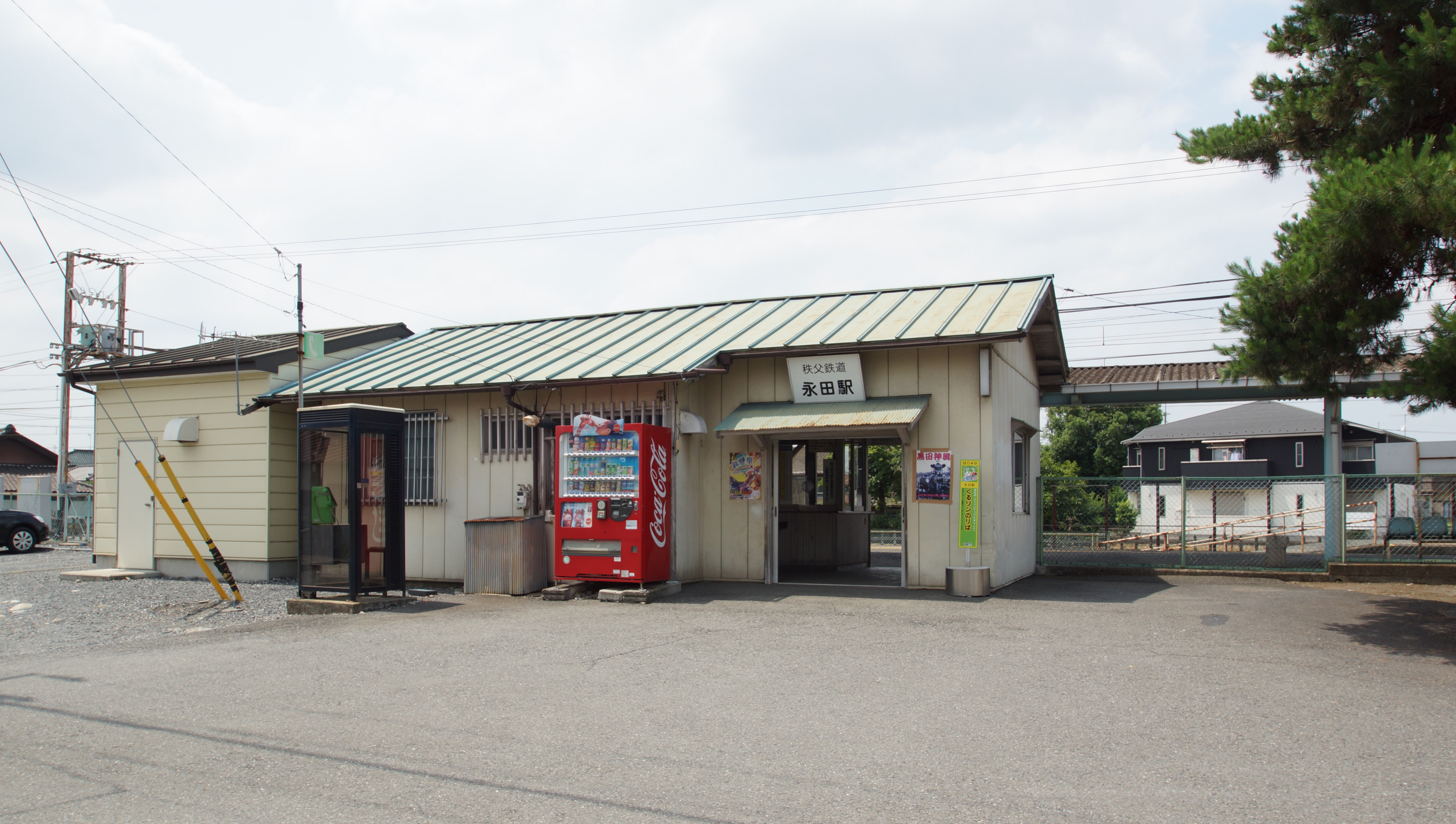
- Nagata Station in June 2017

General information
- Location: 155-4 Nagata, Fukaya-shi, Saitama-ken 299-3233; Japan
- Coordinates: 36°08′06″N 139°15′33″E
- Operator: Chichibu Railway
- Line: ■ Chichibu Main Line
- Distance: 27.1 km from Hanyū
- Platforms: 1 island + 1 side platform
- Tracks: 3
- Connections: Bus stop

Construction
- Cycle facilities: Yes
- Accessible: Access slopes

Other information
- Website: Official website

History
- Opened: 1 June 1913

Passengers
- FY2018: 494 daily

Services
Preceding station	Chichibu Railway	Following station
Fukaya Hanazono CR17 towards Mitsumineguchi	Chichibu Main Line Local	Takekawa CR15 towards Hanyū
Location
- Location within Saitama Prefecture Location within Japan

Nagata Station (永田駅, Nagata-eki) is a passenger railway station located in the city of Fukaya, Saitama, Japan, operated by the private railway operator Chichibu Railway.

== Lines ==
Nagata Station is served by the 71.7 km (44.6 mi) Chichibu Main Line from Hanyū to Mitsumineguchi, and is located 27.1 km (17 mi) from Hanyū.

== Station layout ==
The station is staffed and consists of one side platform (platform 1) and one island platform serving three tracks in total. Track 3 is a bidirectional freight loop not normally used by passenger services.

=== Platforms ===
1	■ Chichibu Main Line	for Yorii, Chichibu, and Mitsumineguchi
2	■ Chichibu Main Line	for Kumagaya and Hanyū

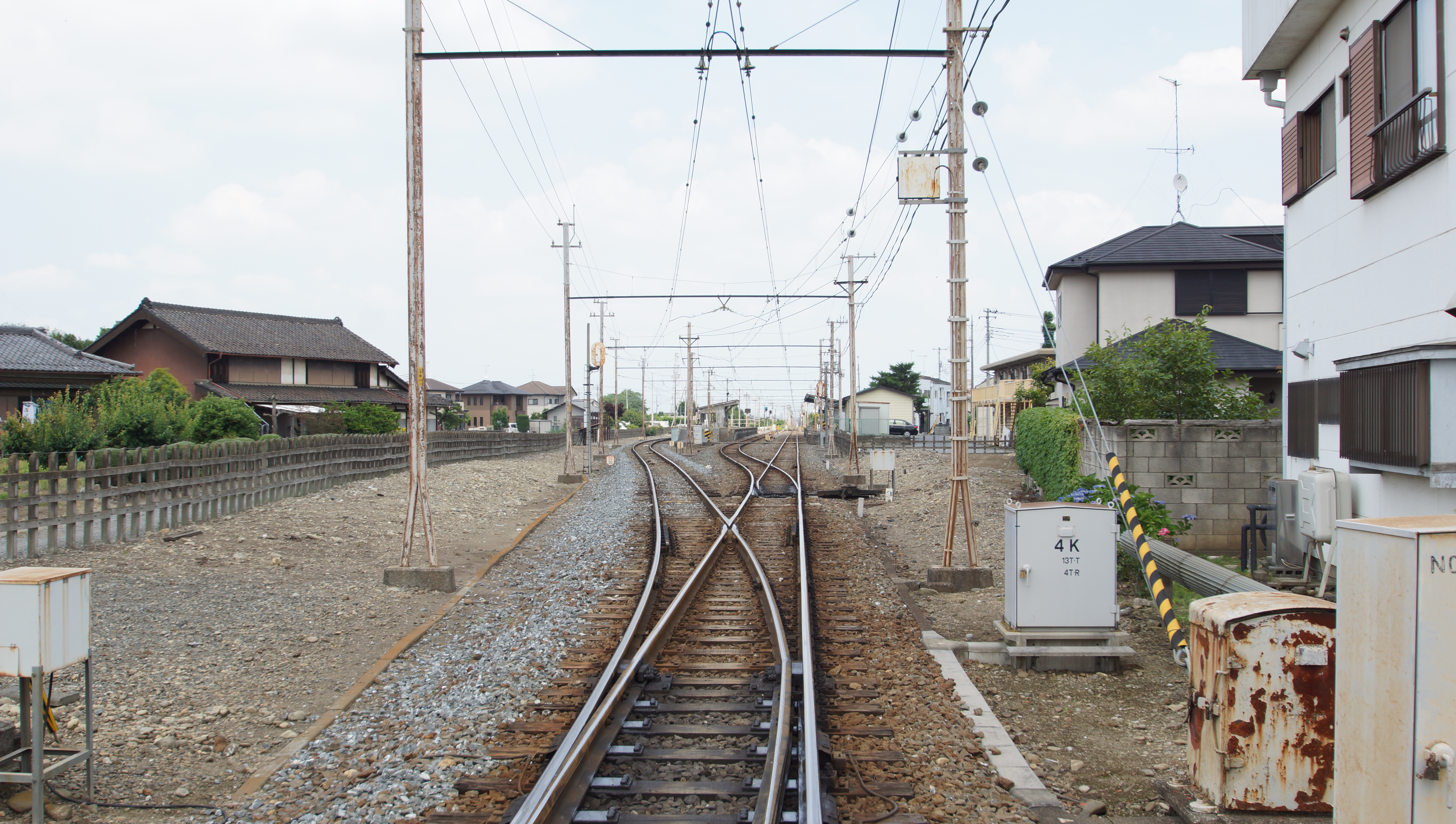
The station viewed from the west in June 2017

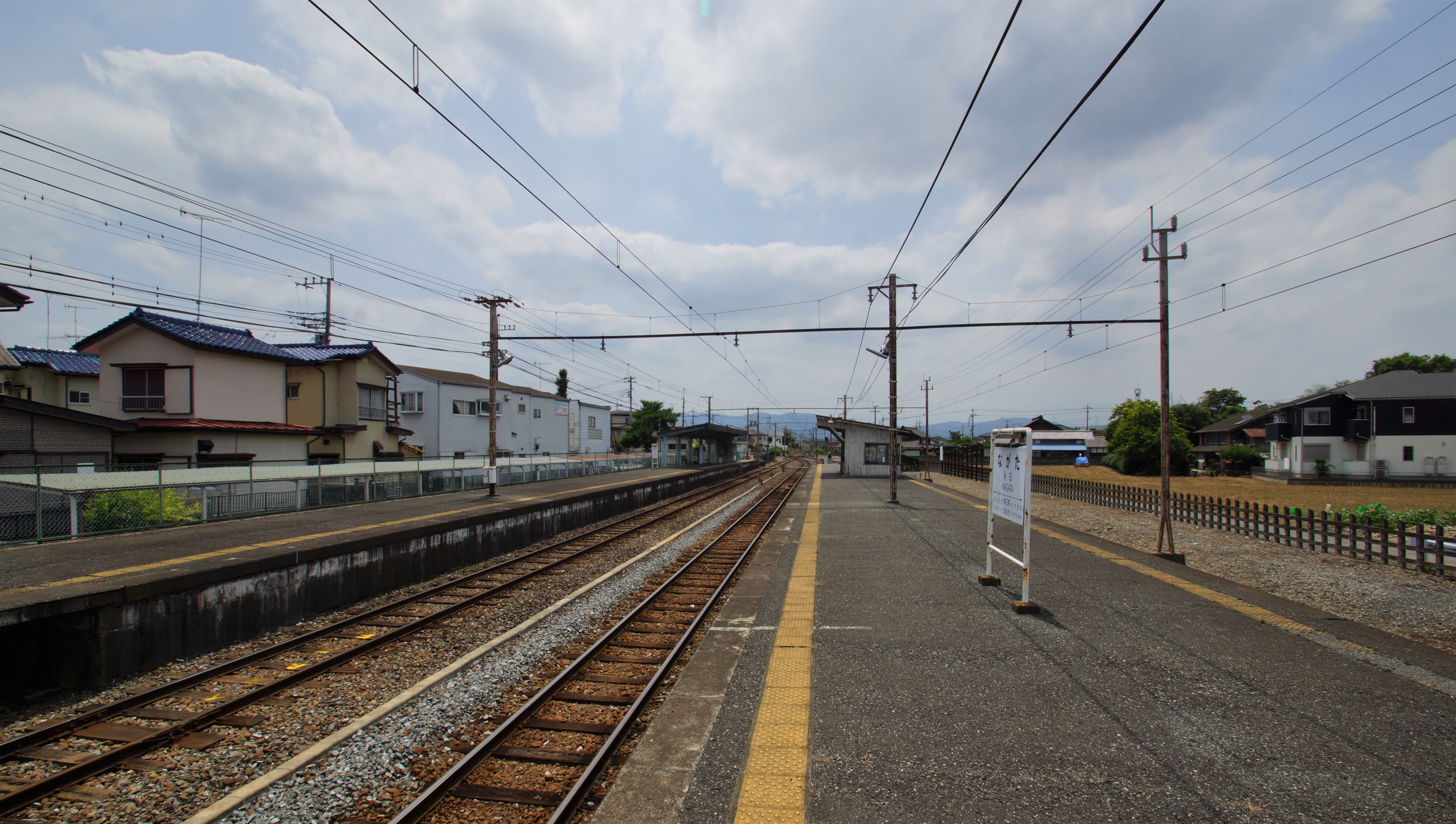
The platforms looking west in June 2017 with platform 1 (Mitsumineguchi-bound) on the left

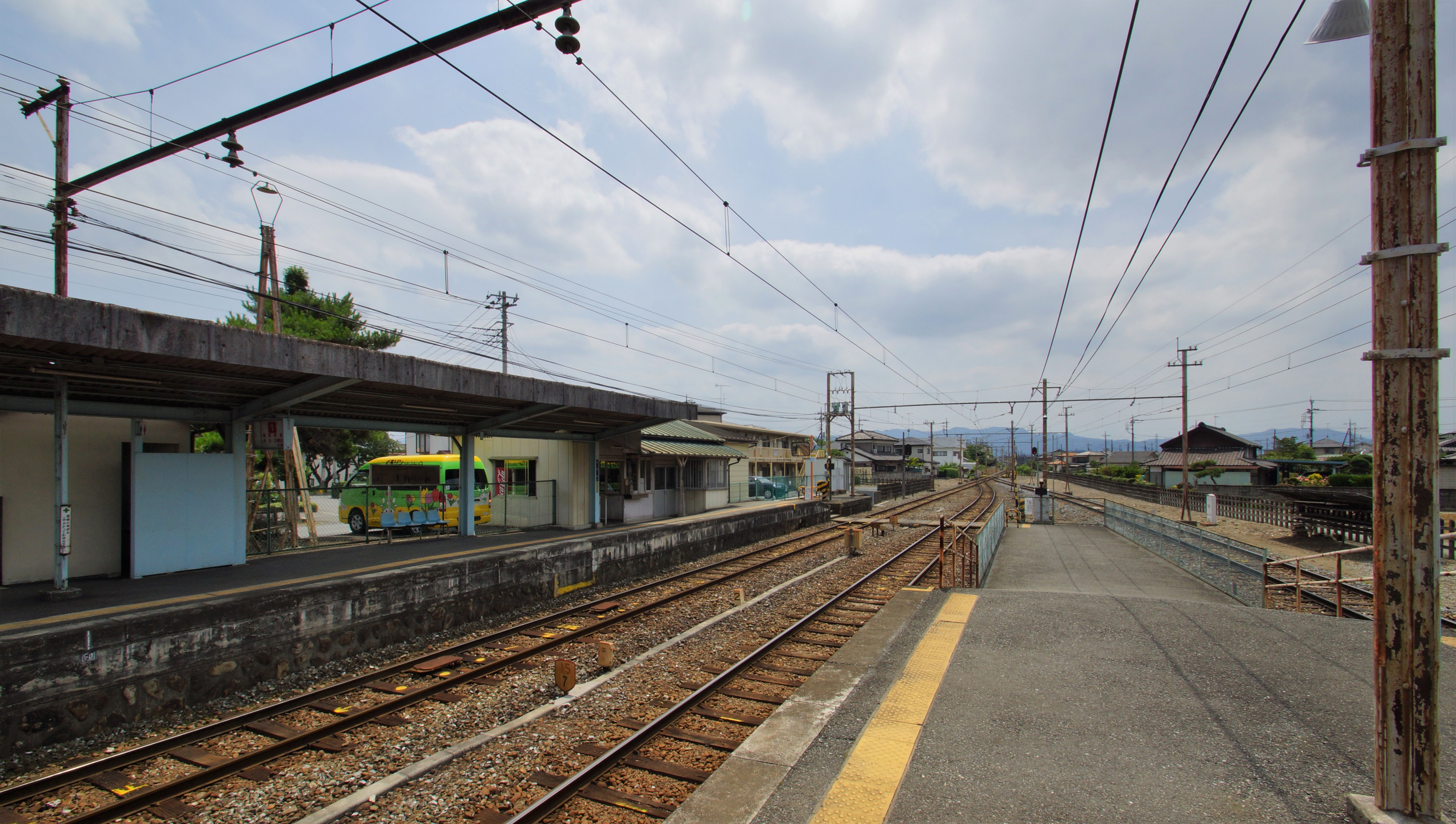
The passenger level crossing between the platforms in June 2017

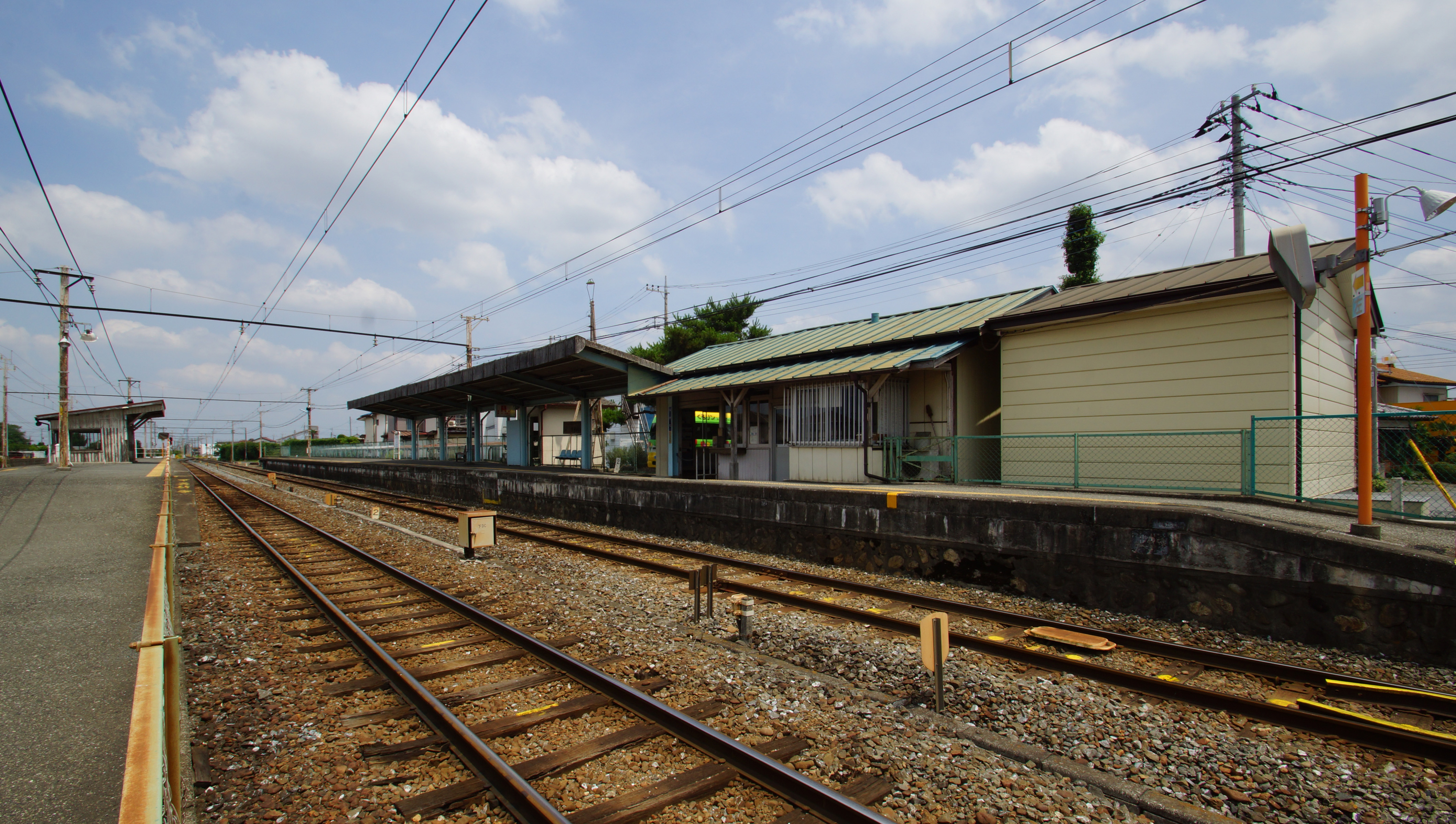
The platforms looking east with platform 1 (Mitsumineguchi-bound) on the right

== History ==
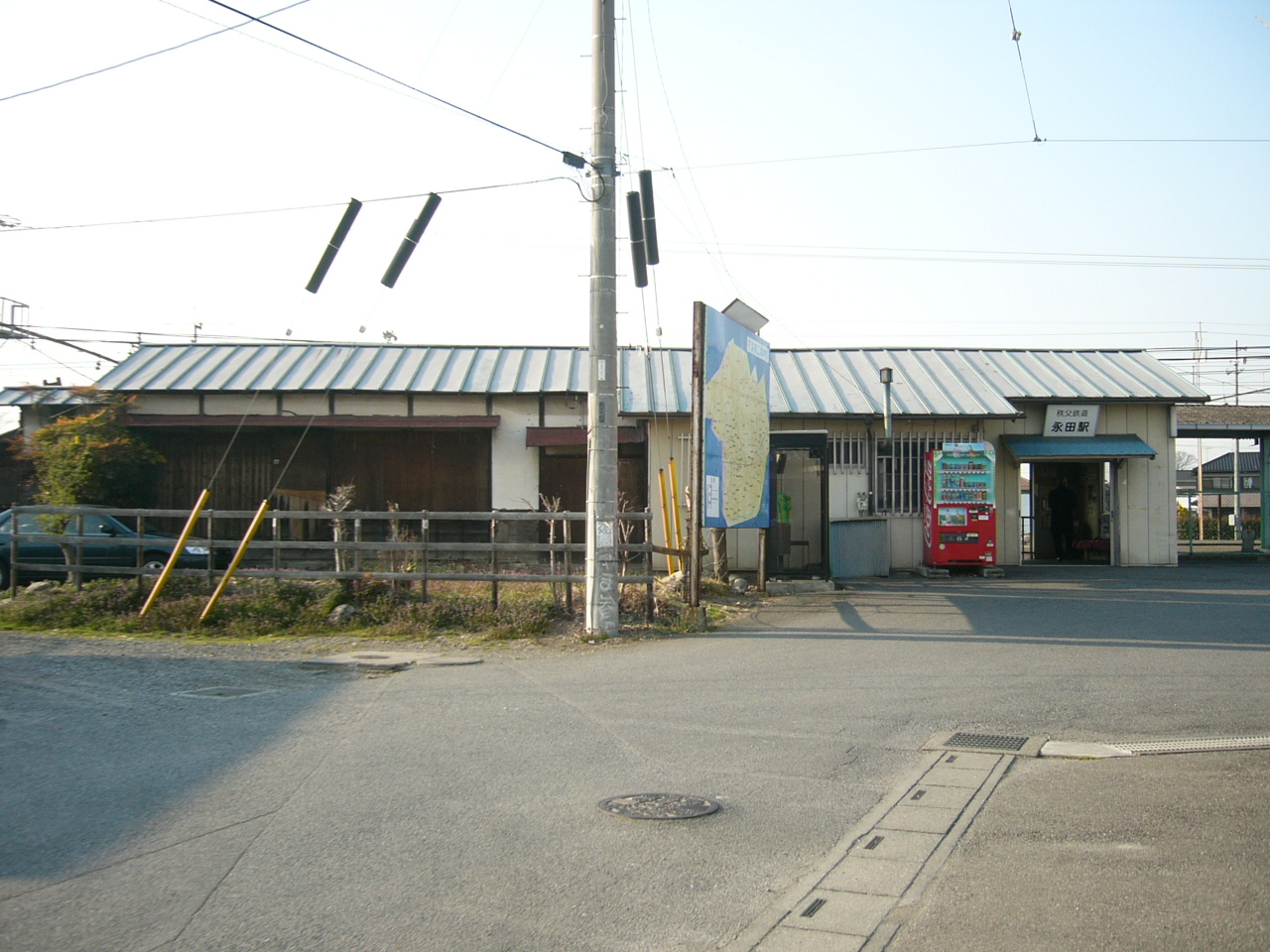
The station in March 2006

Nagata Station opened on 1 June 1913.

== Passenger statistics ==
In fiscal 2018, the station was used by an average of 494 passengers daily.

== Surrounding area ==
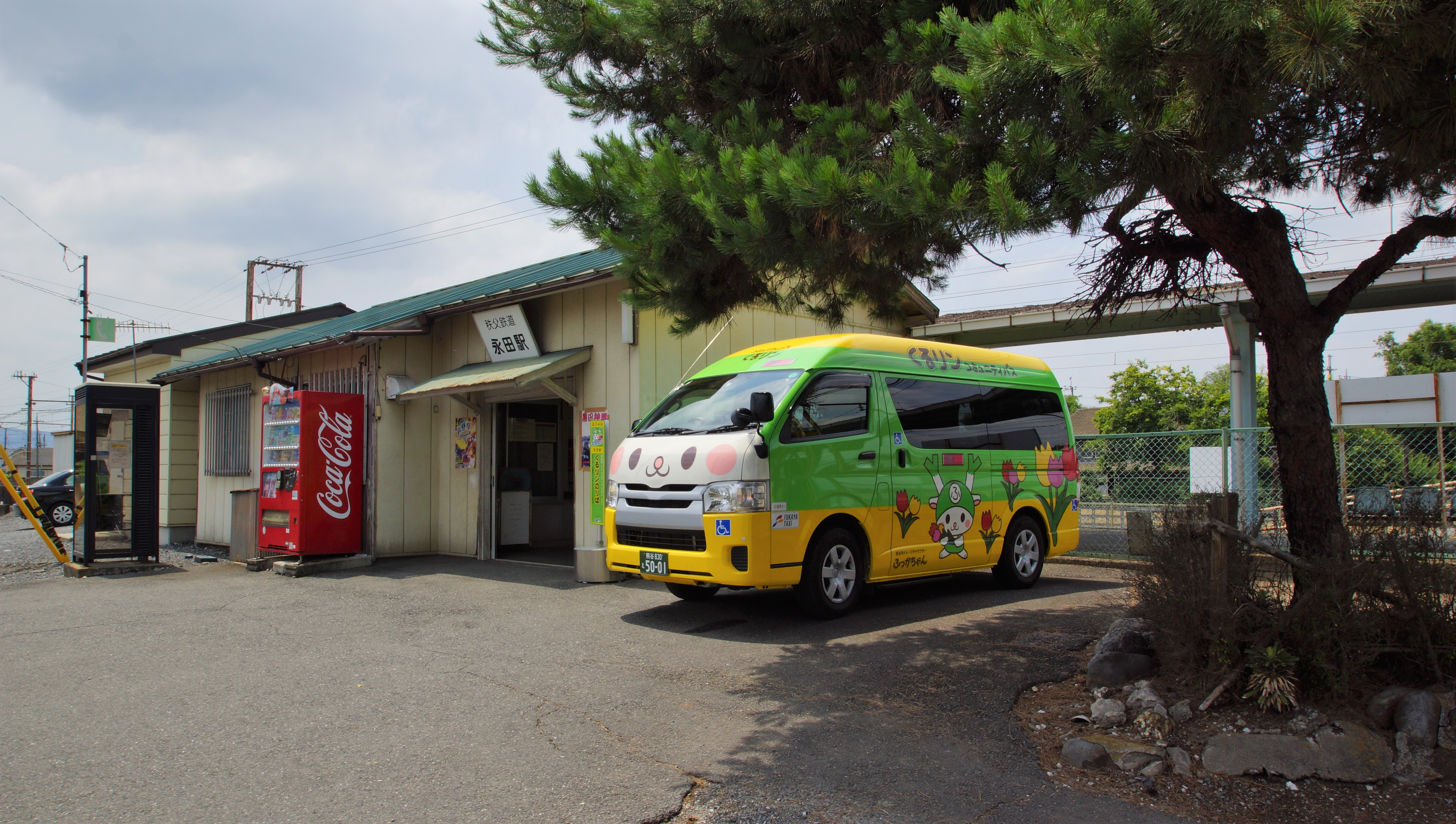
The "Kururin" community bus at Nagata Station in June 2017

- Arakawa River
- National Route 140

== See also ==
- List of railway stations in Japan
