= Omaeda Station =

Railway station in Fukaya, Saitama Prefecture, Japan

CR18 Omaeda Station 小前田駅
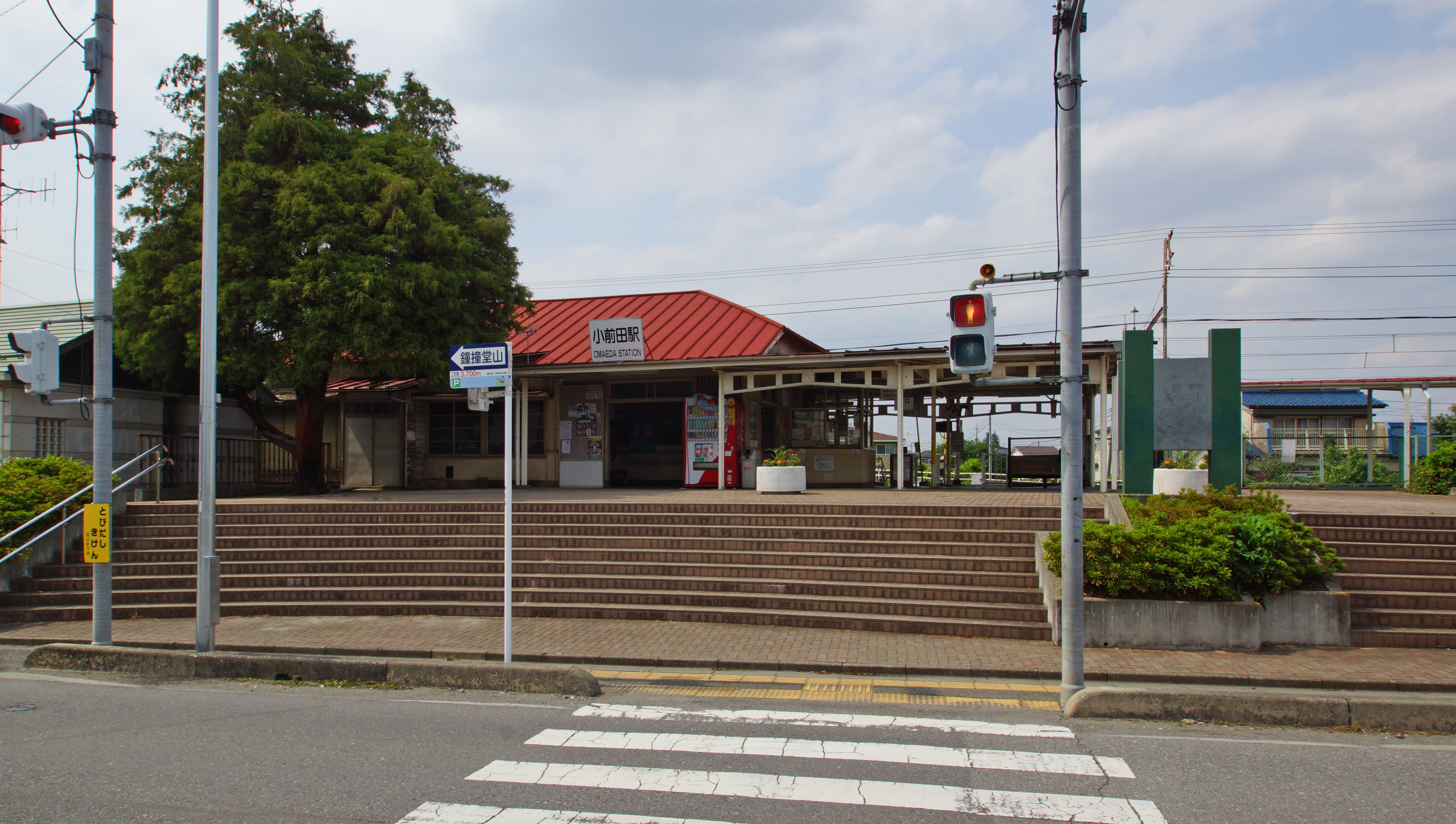
- Omaeda Station in June 2017

General information
- Location: 1680-1 Omaeda, Fukaya-shi, Saitama-ken 369-1246; Japan
- Coordinates: 36°07′44″N 139°13′21″E
- Operator: Chichibu Railway
- Line: ■ Chichibu Main Line
- Distance: 30.5 km from Hanyū
- Platforms: 1 island + 1 side platform
- Tracks: 3

Other information
- Website: Official website

History
- Opened: 7 October 1901

Passengers
- FY2018: 1098 daily

Services
Preceding station	Chichibu Railway	Following station
Sakurazawa CR19 towards Mitsumineguchi	Chichibu Main Line Local	Fukaya Hanazono CR17 towards Hanyū
Location
- Location within Saitama Prefecture Location within Japan

Omaeda Station (小前田駅, Omaeda-eki) is a passenger railway station located in the city of Fukaya, Saitama, Japan, operated by the private railway operator Chichibu Railway.

== Lines ==
Omaeda Station is served by the 71.7 km (44.6 mi) Chichibu Main Line from Hanyū to Mitsumineguchi, and is located 30.5 km from Hanyū. It is also served by through services to and from the Seibu Chichibu Line.

== Station layout ==
The station is staffed and consists of one side platform (platform 1) and one island platform serving three tracks in total. Track 3 is a bidirectional freight loop not normally used by passenger services. Access between the platforms is via a crossing at track level.

=== Platforms ===
1	■ Chichibu Main Line	for Yorii, Chichibu, and Mitsumineguchi
2	■ Chichibu Main Line	for Kumagaya and Hanyū

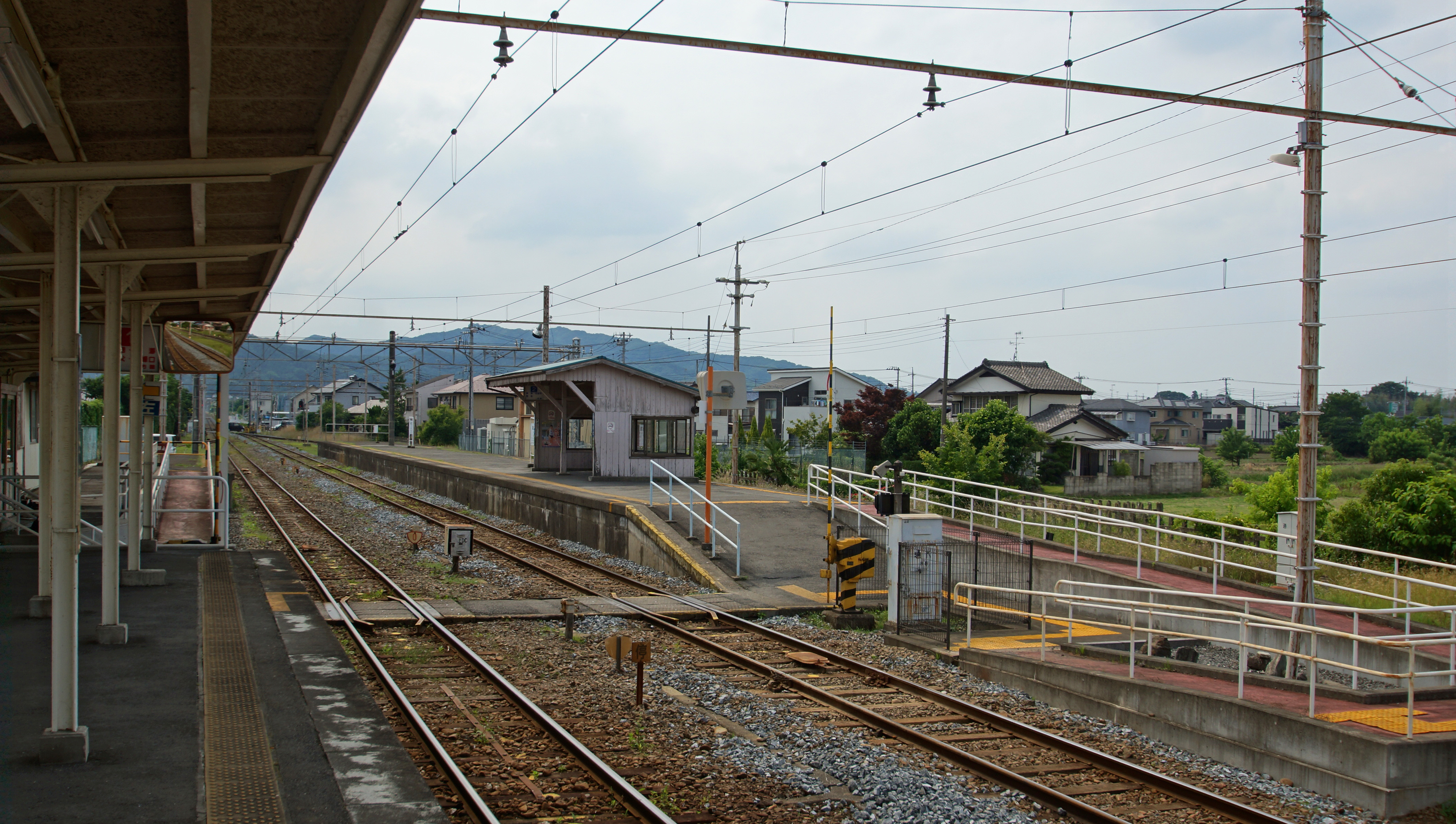
Platform 2 (eastbound) accessed by a passenger level crossing

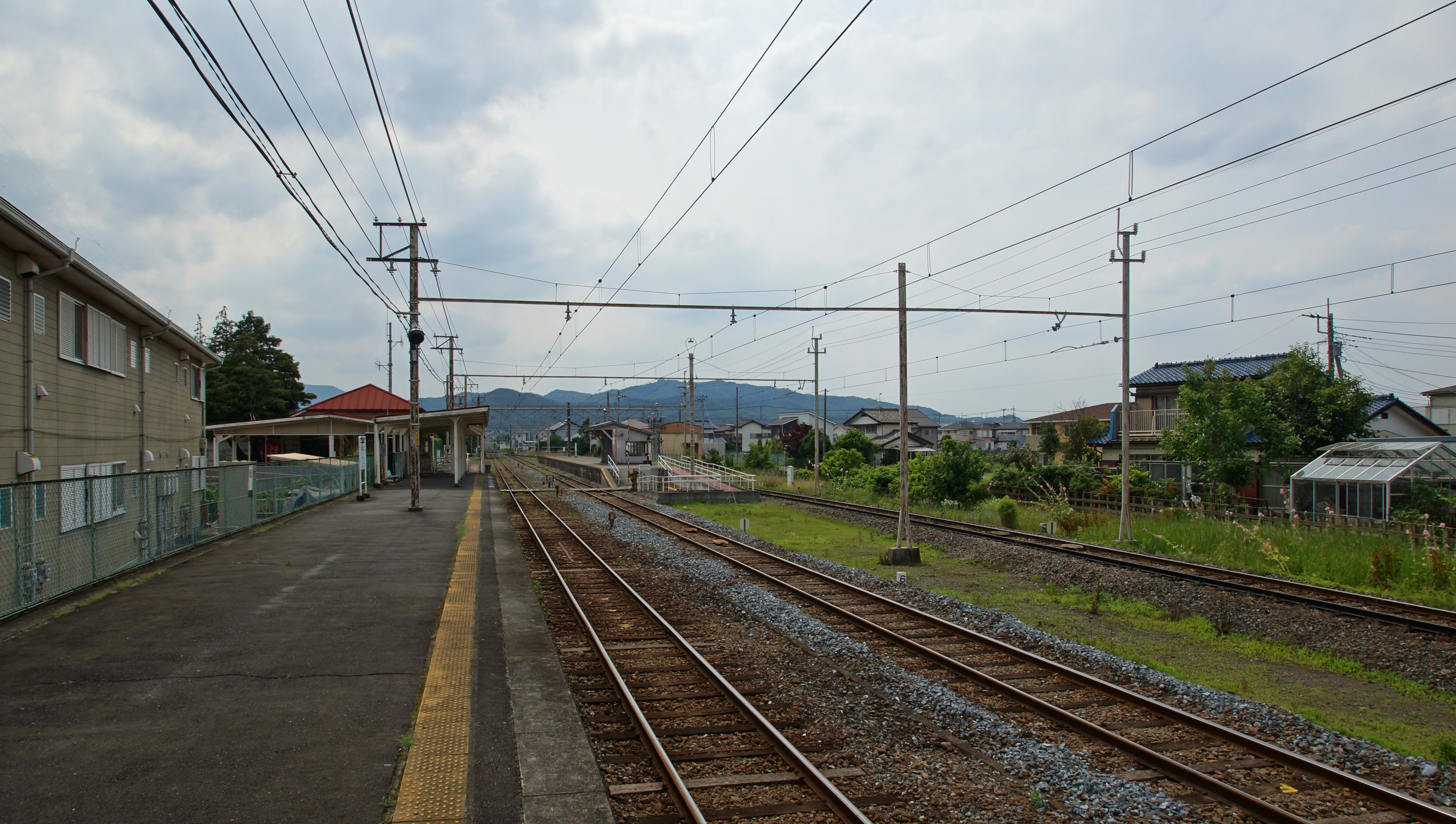
The platforms viewed from the east end of platform 1 with platform 2 on the right in June 2017

== History ==
Omaeda Station opened on 7 October 1901.

There is a pun regarding the station's name. The LED in the carriage displays: “次は オマエダ" (Tsugiwa Omaeda), announcing the next station. But Omaeda also means "you (お前だ)", so the announcement can be interpreted as "You're next", using the blunt form of the word "you". This unusual place name has therefore become viral online as a source of confusion and/or amusement.

== Passenger statistics ==
In the fiscal year of 2018, the station was used by an average of 1098 passengers daily.

== Surrounding area ==
- National Route 140
- Hanazono Junior High School
- Hanazono Elementary School

== See also ==
- List of railway stations in Japan
