= Takekawa Station =

Railway station in Fukaya, Saitama Prefecture, Japan

CR15 Takekawa Station 武川駅
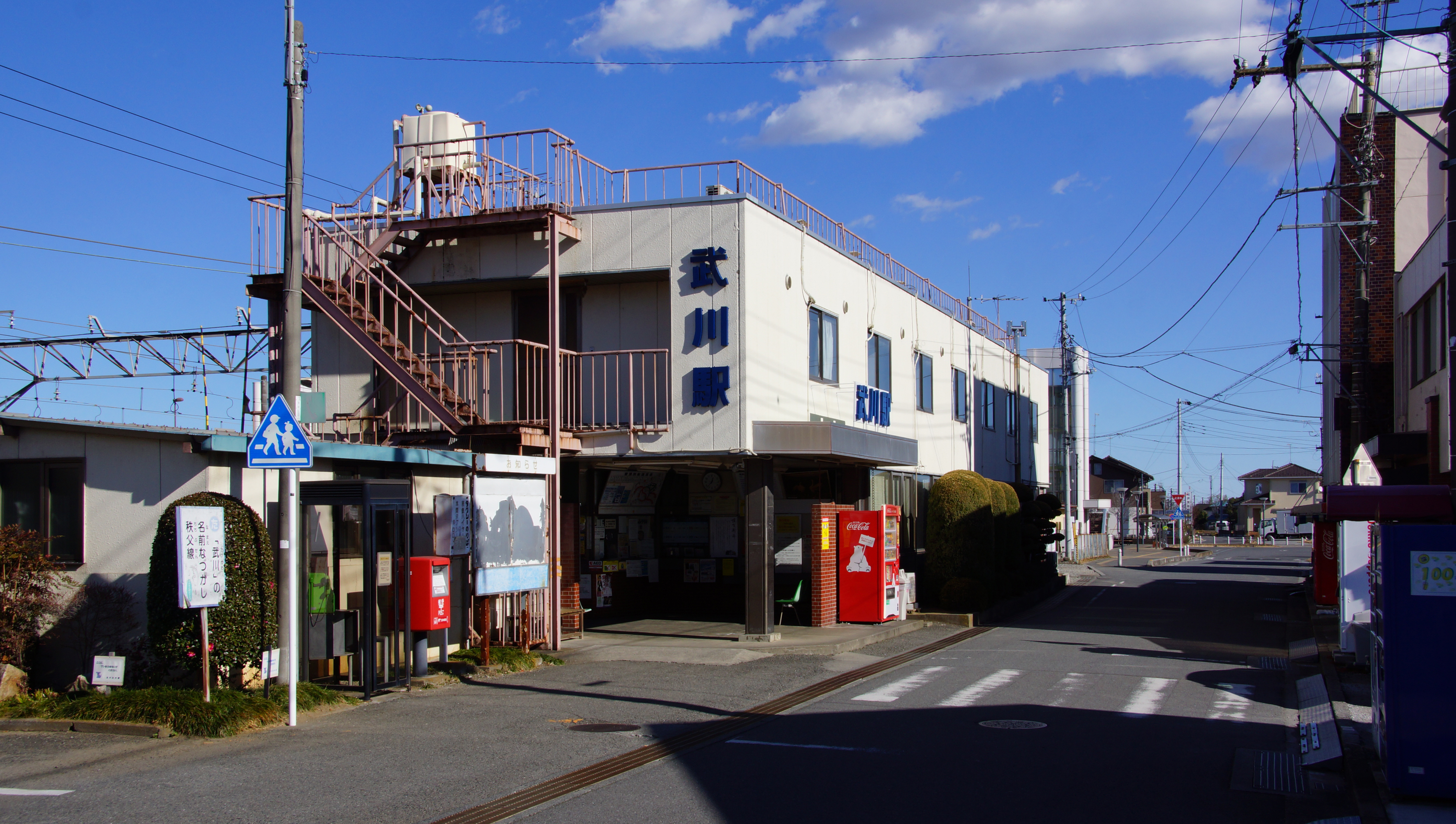
- Takekawa Station in January 2018

General information
- Location: 77 Tanaka, Fukaya-shi, Saitama-ken 369-1108; Japan
- Coordinates: 36.1421°N 139.2827°E
- Operator: Chichibu Railway
- Line: ■ Chichibu Main Line
- Distance: 24.8 km from Hanyū
- Platforms: 1 island platform
- Tracks: 2

Other information
- Website: Official website

History
- Opened: 7 October 1901
- Former names: Tanaka (until 1903)

Passengers
- FY2018: 951 daily

Services
Preceding station	Chichibu Railway	Following station
Fukaya Hanazono CR17 towards Mitsumineguchi	Chichibu Main Line Rapid Chichibuji	Kumagaya CR09 towards Hanyū
Nagata CR16 towards Mitsumineguchi	Chichibu Main Line Local	Aketo CR14 towards Hanyū
Location
- Location within Saitama Prefecture Location within Japan

Takekawa Station (武川駅, Takekawa-eki) is a passenger railway station located in the city of Fukaya, Saitama, Japan, operated by the private railway operator Chichibu Railway.

== Lines ==
Takekawa Station is served by the 71.7 km Chichibu Main Line from Hanyū to Mitsumineguchi, and is located 24.8 km from Hanyū.

== Station layout ==
The station is staffed and consists of a single island platform serving two tracks. Three freight loops and additional sidings lie to the north of the platform tracks.

=== Platforms ===
1	■ Chichibu Main Line	for Kumagaya and Hanyū
2	■ Chichibu Main Line	for Yorii, Chichibu, and Mitsumineguchi

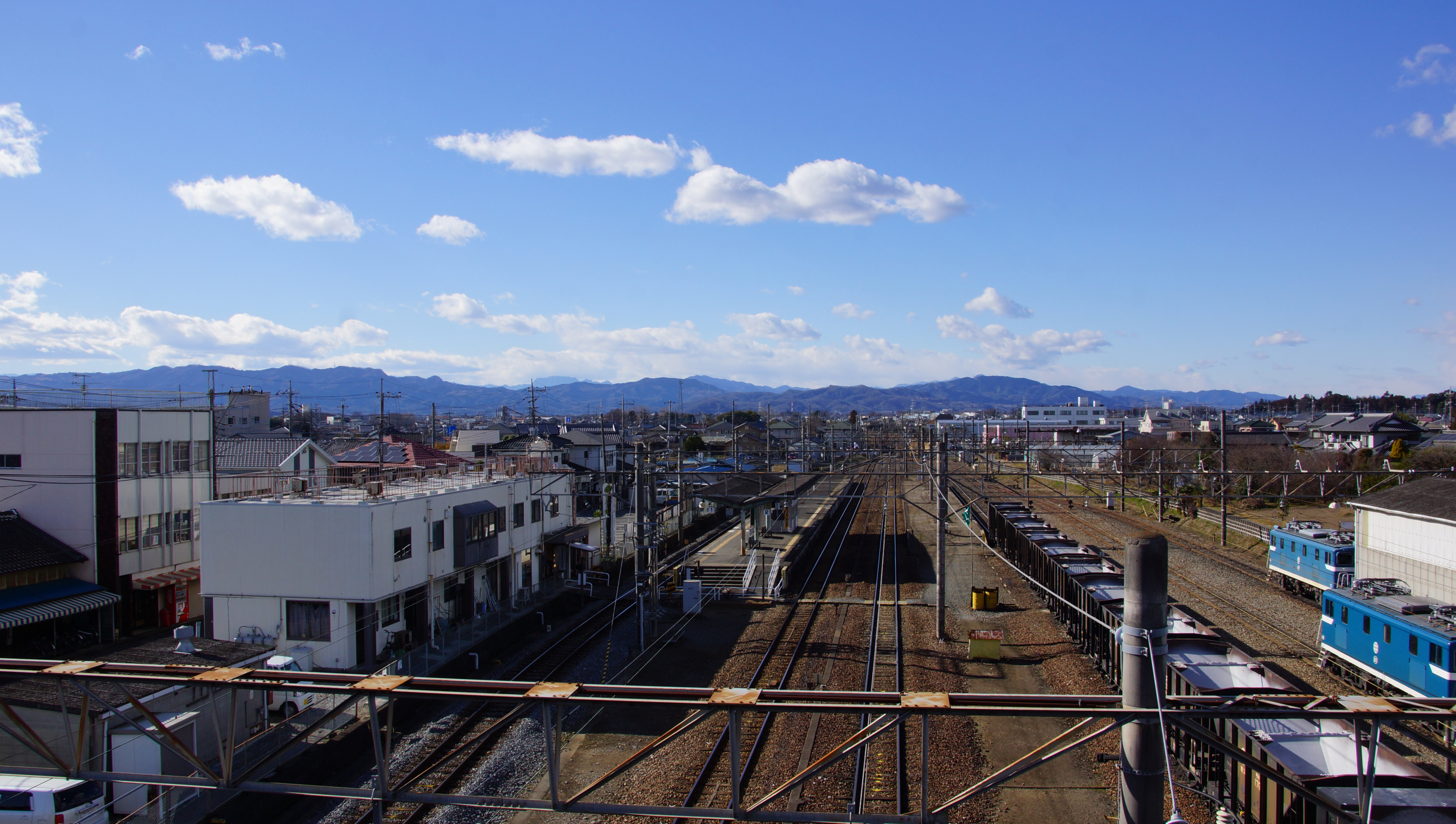
An overview of the station in January 2018

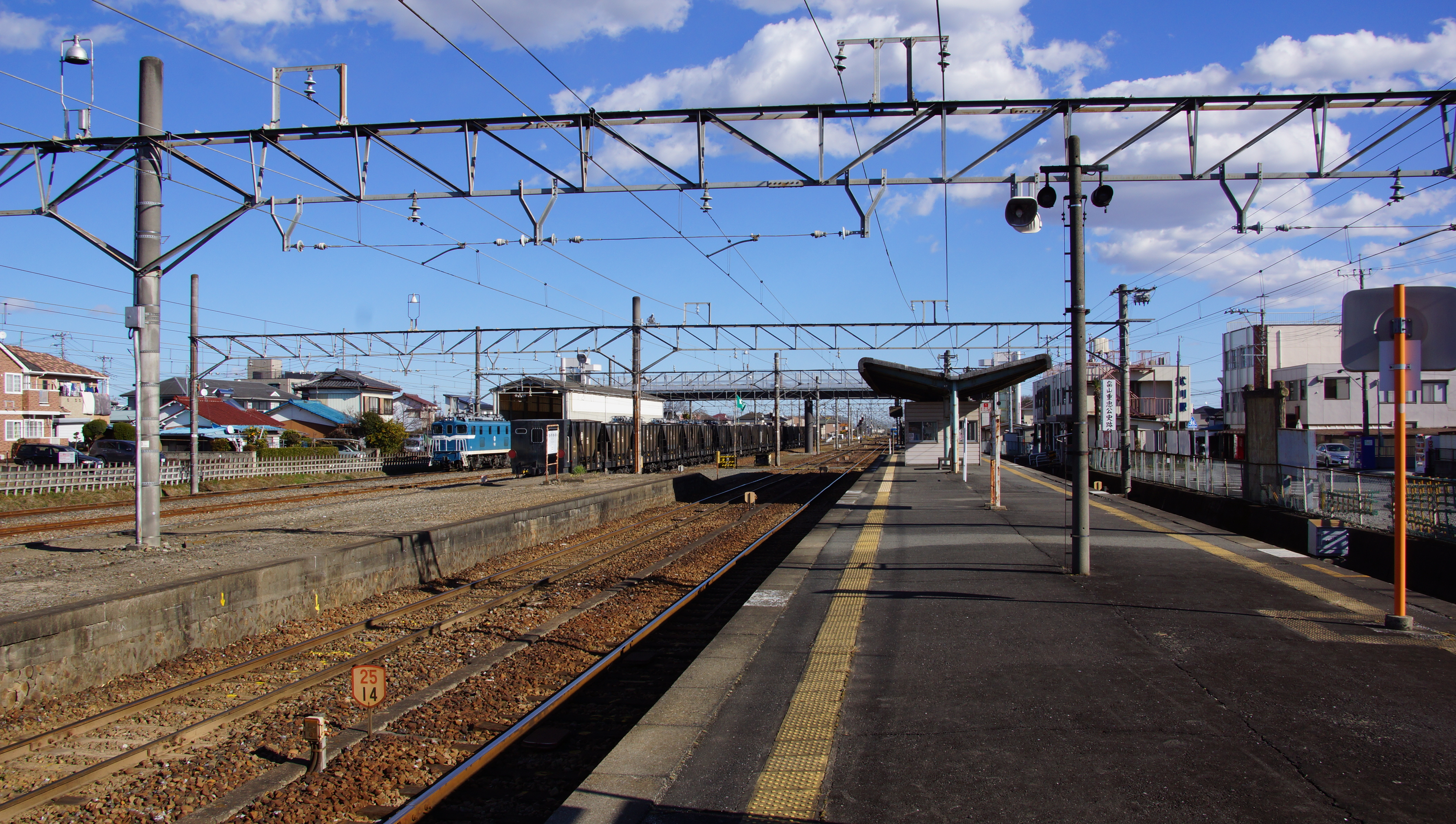
The passenger platform in January 2018

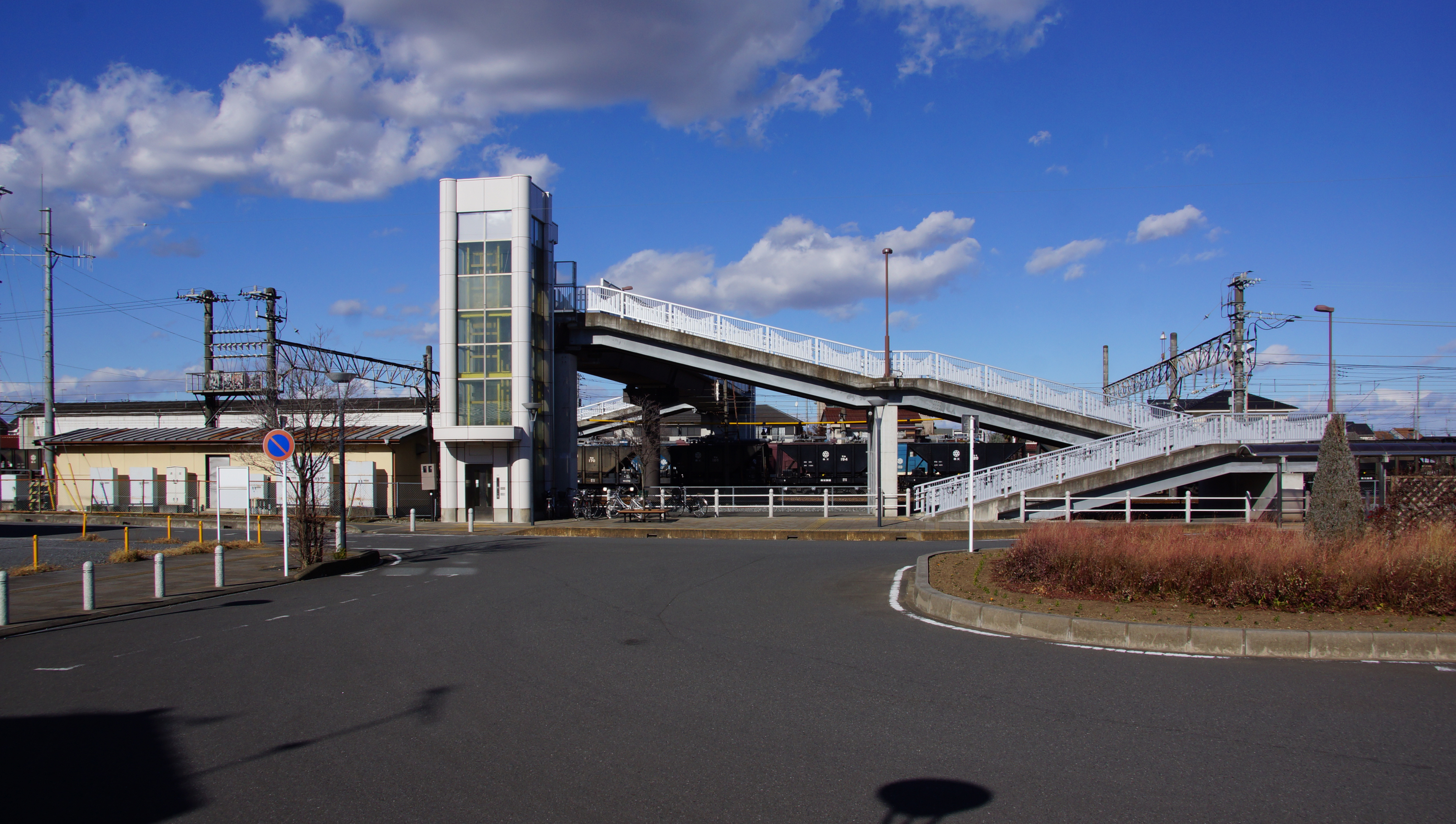
The south side of the station in January 2018

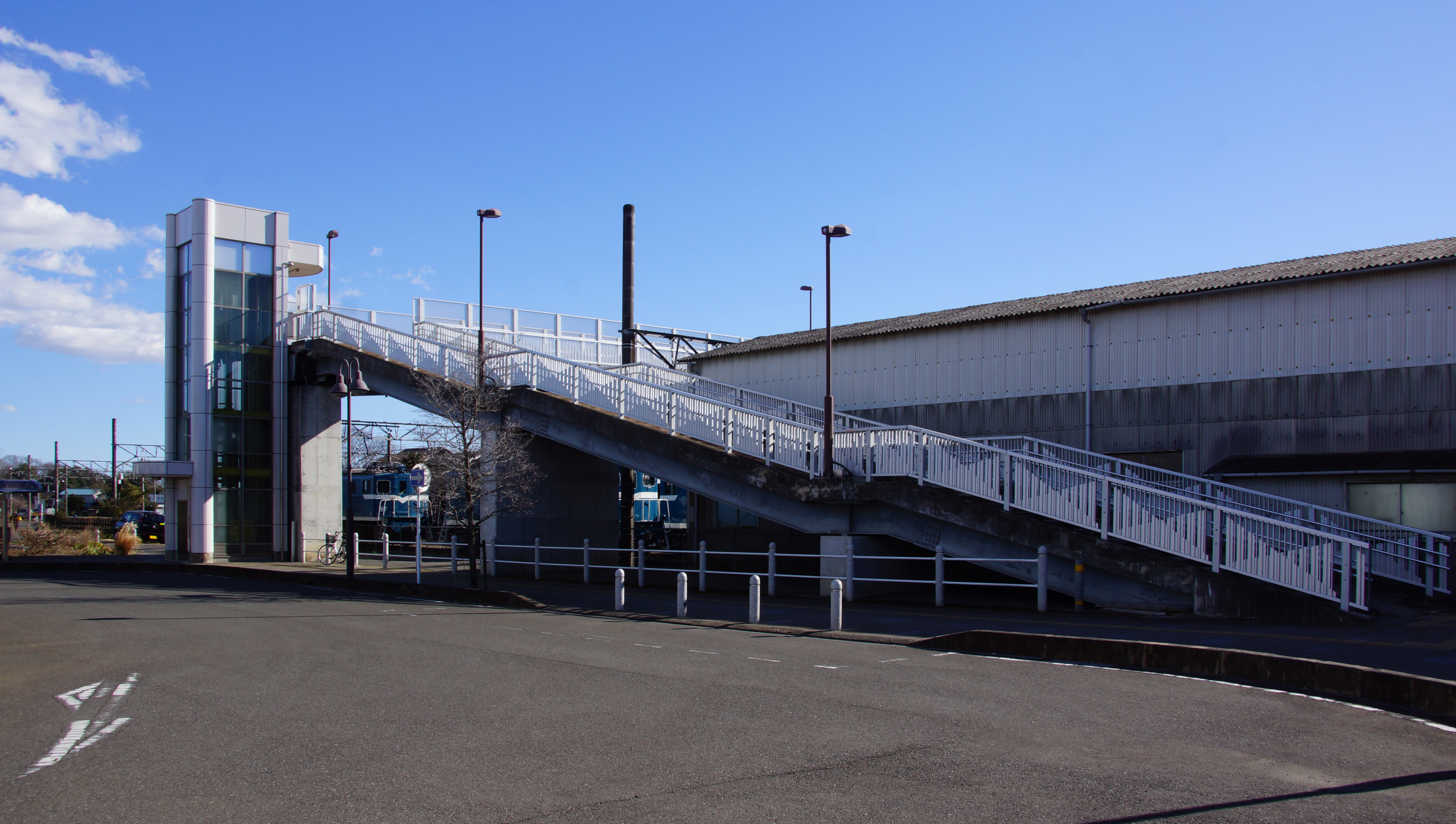
The north side of the station in January 2018

== History ==
The station opened on 7 October 1901 as Tanaka Station (田中駅). It was renamed Takekawa from 24 June 1903.

== Passenger statistics ==
In fiscal 2018, the station was used by an average of 951 passengers daily.

== Surrounding area ==
- Arakawa River
- National Route 140

== See also ==
- List of railway lines in Japan
