= Fukaya Hanazono Station =

Railway station in Fukaya, Saitama Prefecture, Japan

CR17 Fukaya Hanazono Station ふかや花園駅
- Station entrance

General information
- Location: 113 Kuroda, Fukaya-shi, Saitama-ken 369-1244; Japan
- Coordinates: 36°07′50.725″N 139°14′53.174″E
- Operator: Chichibu Railway
- Line: ■ Chichibu Main Line
- Distance: 28.1 km from Hanyū
- Platforms: 1 side platform
- Tracks: 1

Construction
- Accessible: Access ramps

Other information
- Website: Official website

History
- Opened: 20 October 2018

Passengers
- FY2020: 649,000 annually (forecast)

Services
Preceding station	Chichibu Railway	Following station
Yorii CR20 towards Mitsumineguchi	SL Paleo Express	Kumagaya CR09 Terminus
Yorii CR20 towards Mitsumineguchi	Chichibu Main Line Rapid Chichibuji	Takekawa CR15 towards Hanyū
Omaeda CR18 towards Mitsumineguchi	Chichibu Main Line Local	Nagata CR16 towards Hanyū
Location
- Location within Saitama Prefecture Location within Japan

Fukaya Hanazono Station (ふかや花園駅, Fukaya Hanazono-eki) is a passenger railway station located in the city of Fukaya, Saitama, Japan, operated by the private railway operator Chichibu Railway.

== Lines ==
Fukaya Hanazono Station is served by the 71.7 km (44.6 mi) Chichibu Main Line from Hanyū to Mitsumineguchi, and is located 28.1 km from Hanyū (1.1 km from Nagata Station to the east, and 2.3 km from Omaeda Station to the west).

== Station layout ==
The station has a 110 m-long (360 ft) side platform enabling Paleo Express steam-hauled services to stop.

== History ==
The Chichibu Railway officially announced its plans to build the new station on 14 June 2017.

Construction of the station commenced in June 2017, with the city of Fukaya bearing the entire cost of approximately JPY400 million. The station opened to passengers on 20 October 2018.

== Surrounding area ==
The station is located in the Kuroda district of the city of Fukaya, and provides access to the nearby Hanazono Premium Outlet Mall scheduled to open in October 2020.

- Kan-Etsu Expressway (Hanazono Interchange)
- National Route 140

== See also ==
- List of railway stations in Japan
