= Sakurazawa Station =

Railway station in Yorii, Saitama Prefecture, Japan

CR19 Sakurazawa Station 桜沢駅
- Sakurazawa Station, November 2012

General information
- Location: 1987-1 Sakurazawa, Yorii-machi, Osato-gun, Saitama-ken 369-1202; Japan
- Coordinates: 36°07′43″N 139°12′25″E
- Operator: Chichibu Railway
- Line: ■ Chichibu Main Line
- Distance: 31.9 km from Hanyū
- Platforms: 1 island platform

Other information
- Website: Official website

History
- Opened: 1 April 1989

Passengers
- FY2018: 918 daily

Services
Preceding station	Chichibu Railway	Following station
Yorii CR20 towards Mitsumineguchi	Chichibu Main Line Local	Omaeda CR18 towards Hanyū
Location
- Location within Saitama Prefecture Location within Japan

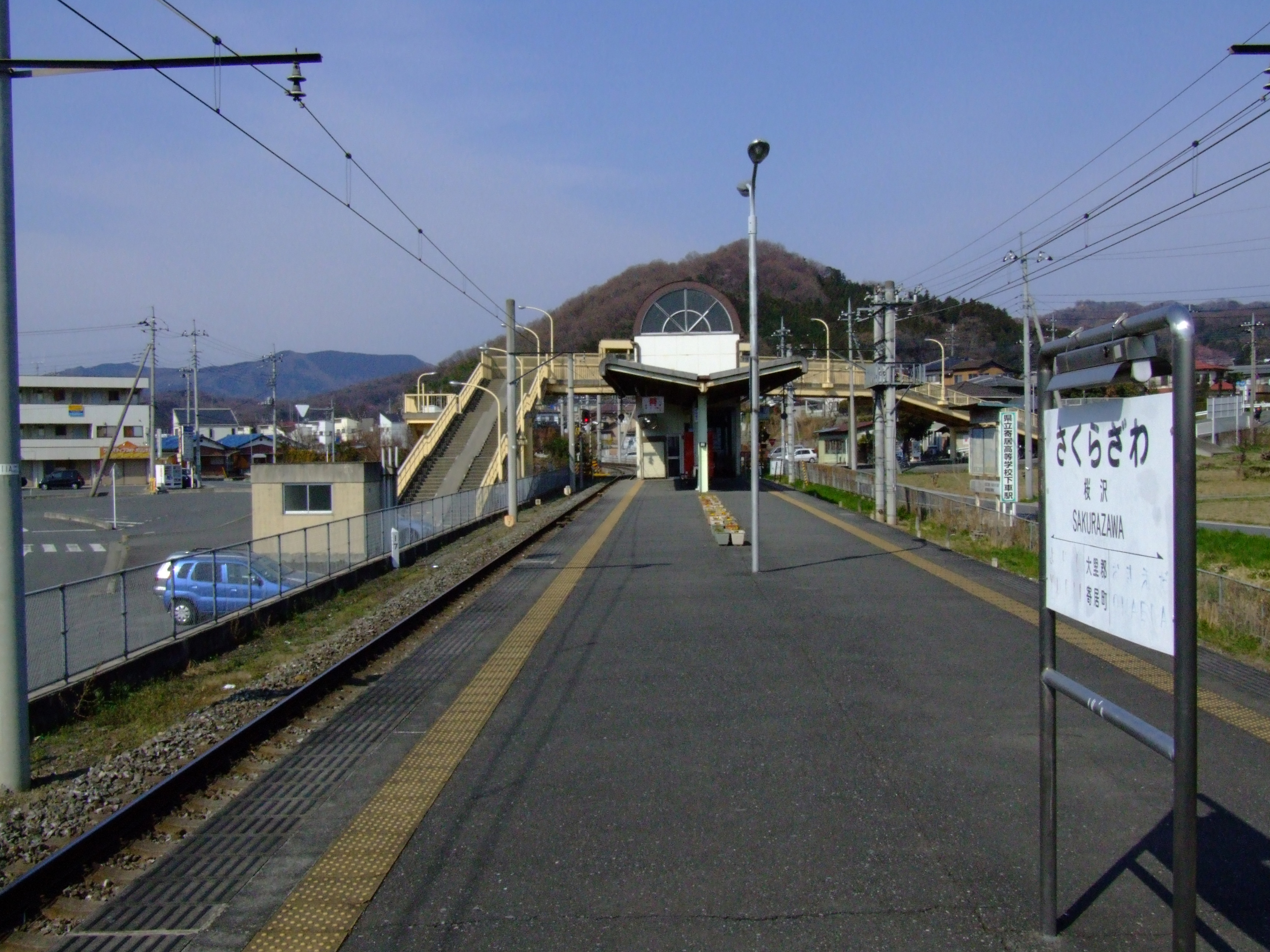
The platform, March 2006

Sakurazawa Station (桜沢駅, Sakurazawa-eki) is a passenger railway station in the town of Yorii, Saitama, Japan, operated by the private railway operator Chichibu Railway.

== Lines ==
Sakurazawa Station is served by the Chichibu Main Line from Hanyū to Mitsumineguchi, and is located 31.9 km from Hanyū.

== Station layout ==
The station is staffed and consists of a single island platform serving two tracks.

=== Platforms ===
1	■ Chichibu Main Line	for Yorii, Chichibu and Mitsumineguchi
2	■ Chichibu Main Line	for Kumagaya and Hanyū

== History ==
Sakurazawa Station opened on 1 April 1989.

== Passenger statistics ==
In fiscal 2018, the station was used by an average of 918 passengers daily.

== Surrounding area ==
- National Route 140
- National Route 254
- Saitama Prefectural Yorii Jōhoku High School
- Yorii Junior High School
- Sakurazawa Elementary School

== See also ==
- List of railway stations in Japan
