= Nishi-Hanyū Station =

Railway station in Hanyū, Saitama Prefecture, Japan

Coordinates: 36°10′35″N 139°31′26″E

CR02 Nishi-Hanyū Station 西羽生駅
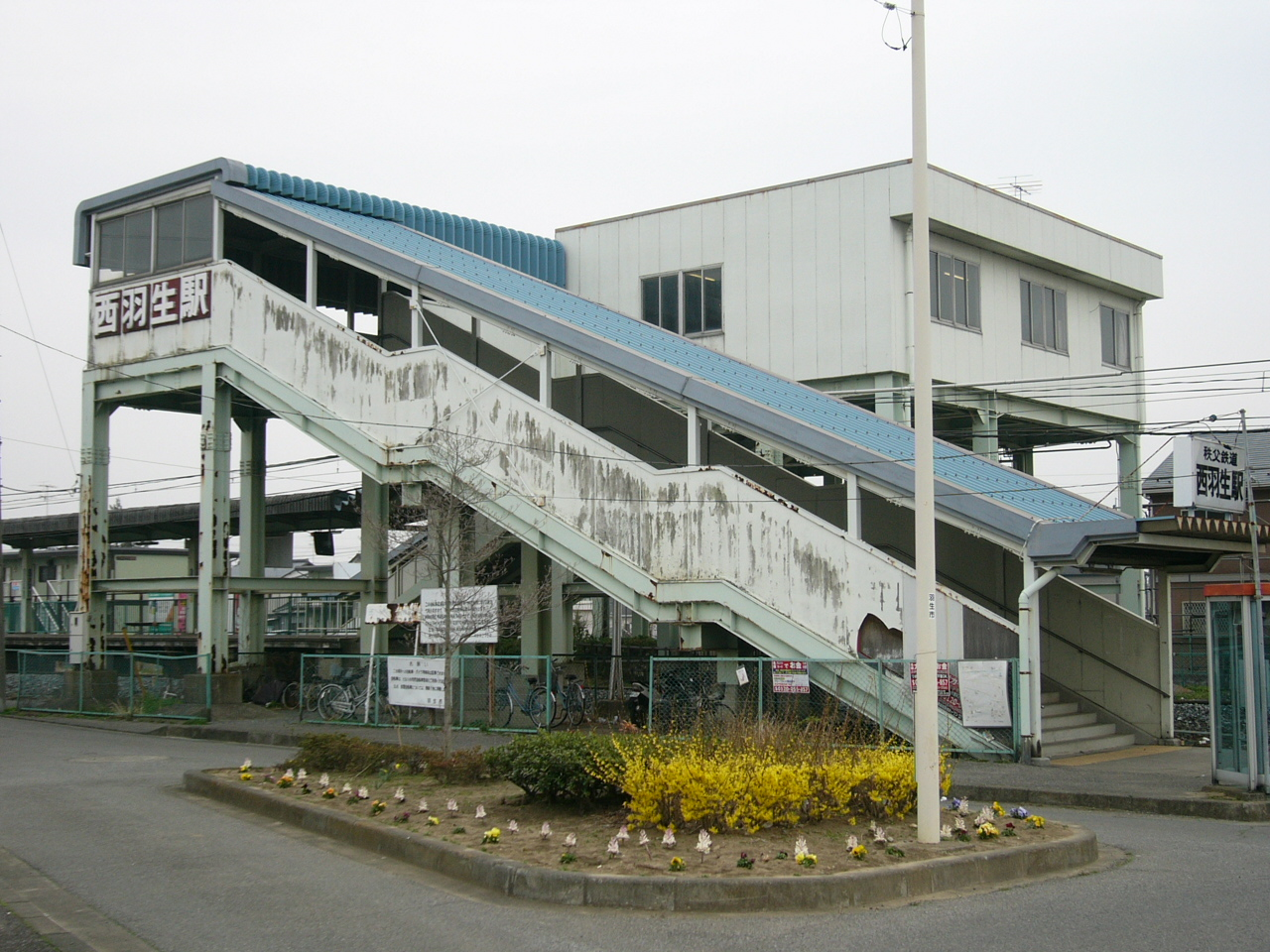
- Nishi-Hanyū Station north entrance in March 2006

General information
- Location: 5-32-2 Nishi, Hanyū-shi, Saitama-ken 348-0054; Japan
- Operator: Chichibu Railway
- Line: ■ Chichibu Main Line
- Distance: 1.2 km from Hanyū
- Platforms: 1 island platform
- Tracks: 1

Other information
- Website: Official website

History
- Opened: 1 September 1981

Passengers
- FY2018: 323 daily

Services
| Preceding station | Chichibu Railway | Following station |
|---|---|---|
| Shingō CR03 towards Mitsumineguchi | Chichibu Main Line Local | Hanyū CR01 Terminus |
Location
- Location within Saitama Prefecture Location within Japan

Nishi-Hanyū Station (西羽生駅, Nishi-Hanyū-eki; lit. "West Hanyū Station") is a passenger railway station located in the city of Hanyū, Saitama, Japan, operated by the private railway operator Chichibu Railway.

== Station layout ==
This station consists of a single side platform, serving a single bi-directional track.

== Lines ==
Nishi-Hanyū Station is served by the 71.7 km Chichibu Main Line from Hanyū to Mitsumineguchi, and is located 1.2 km from Hanyū.

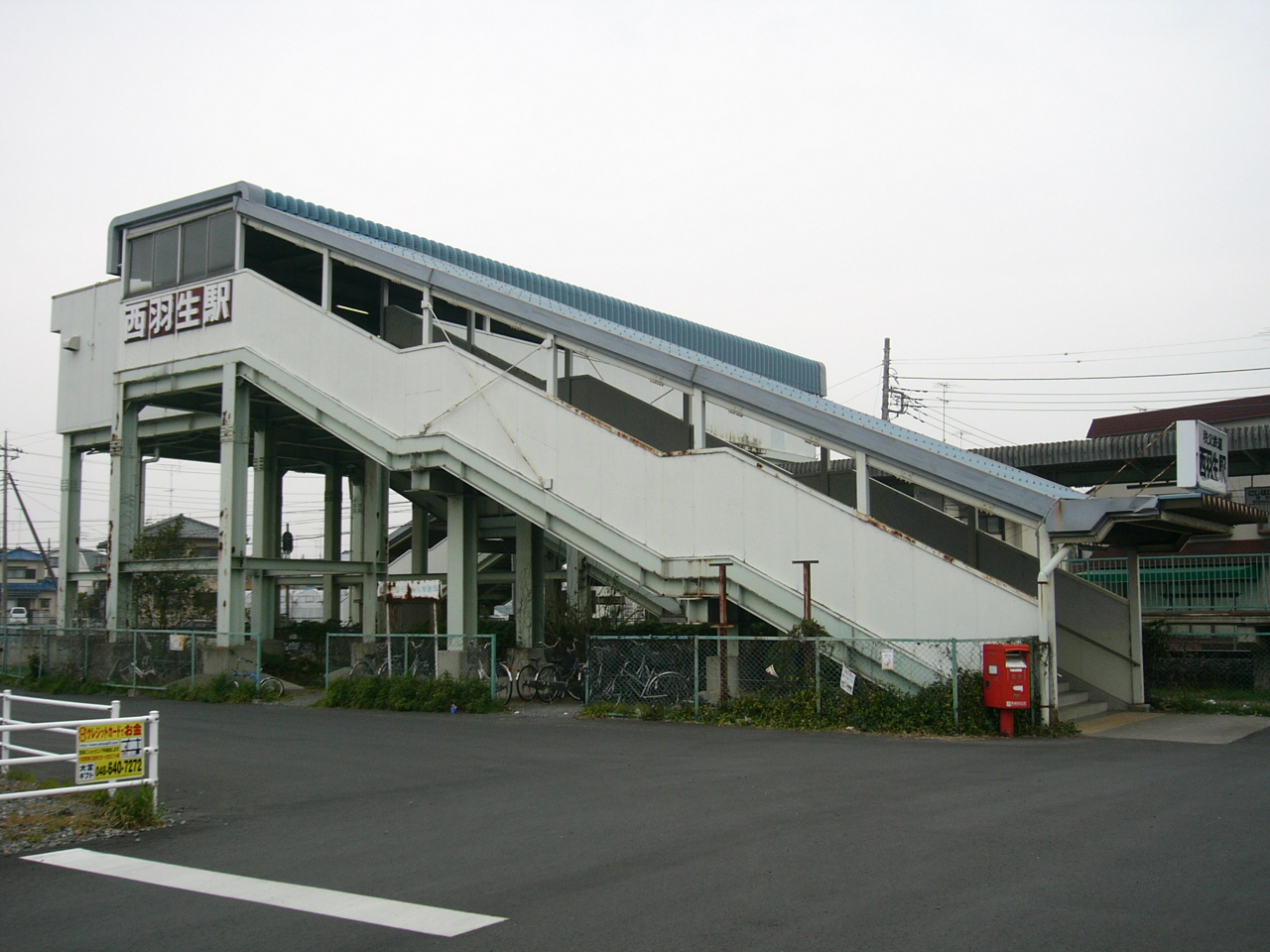
The south entrance in March 2006

== History ==
Nishi-Hanyū Station opened on 1 September 1981.

== Passenger statistics ==
In fiscal 2018, the station was used by an average of 323 passengers daily.

== Surrounding area ==
- National Route 122
- Hanyu-jitsugyo High School

== See also ==
- List of railway stations in Japan
