= Yorii Station =

Railway station in Yorii, Saitama Prefecture, Japan

TJ39 CR20 Yorii Station 寄居駅
- The south entrance in January 2026

General information
- Location: Yorii, Yorii-machi, Ōsato-gun, Saitama-ken 369-1203; Japan
- Coordinates: 36.117770°N 139.194632°E
- Operator: JR East; Tōbu Railway; Chichibu Railway (manager)
- Lines: ■ Hachiko Line; ■ Tōbu Tōjō Line; ■ Chichibu Main Line
- Distance: 75.0 km from Ikebukuro
- Platforms: 6 (3 island platforms)

Other information
- Station code: TJ-39 (Tobu)

History
- Opened: 7 October 1901

Services
Preceding station	JR East	Following station
Yōdo towards Takasaki	Hachikō Line	Orihara towards Komagawa
Preceding station	Tobu Railway	Following station
Terminus	Tojo Line	Tamayodo TJ38 towards Ogawamachi
Preceding station	Chichibu Railway	Following station
Nagatoro CR24 towards Mitsumineguchi	SL Paleo Express	Fukaya Hanazono CR17 towards Kumagaya
Nogami CR23 towards Mitsumineguchi	Chichibu Main Line Rapid Chichibuji	Fukaya Hanazono CR17 towards Hanyū
Hagure CR21 towards Mitsumineguchi	Chichibu Main Line Local	Sakurazawa CR19 towards Hanyū
Location
- Location within Saitama Prefecture Location within Japan

Yorii Station (寄居駅, Yorii-eki) is a joint-use passenger railway station in the town of Yorii, Saitama, Japan, jointly operated by East Japan Railway Company (JR East) and the private railway operators Tōbu Railway and Chichibu Railway. The station premises are managed by Chichibu Railway.

== Lines ==
Yorii Station is served by the following three lines.

- Hachiko Line (Komagawa - Takasaki)
- Tōbu Tōjō Line (from Ikebukuro in Tokyo)
- Chichibu Main Line (Mitsumineguchi - Hanyū)

On the Tōbu Tōjō Line during the daytime, the station is served by two "Local" (all-stations) trains per hour in each direction to and from Ogawamachi. There are no direct train services to or from Ikebukuro, although most trains are timetabled to allow for onward connections to an Ikebukuro-bound train at Ogawamachi or Shinrin-kōen.

== Station layout ==
The station consists of three island platforms, each serving two tracks for the Tōbu Tōjō Line, Chichibu Main Line, and Hachikō Line.

=== Platforms ===
1/2	Tōbu Tōjō Line	for Ogawamachi and Shinrin-kōen
3	Chichibu Main Line	for Nagatoro, Chichibu, and Mitsumineguchi
4	Chichibu Main Line	for Kumagaya, Gyōdashi, and Hanyū
5	■ Hachiko Line	for Ogawamachi, Ogose, and Komagawa
6	■ Hachiko Line	for Takasaki

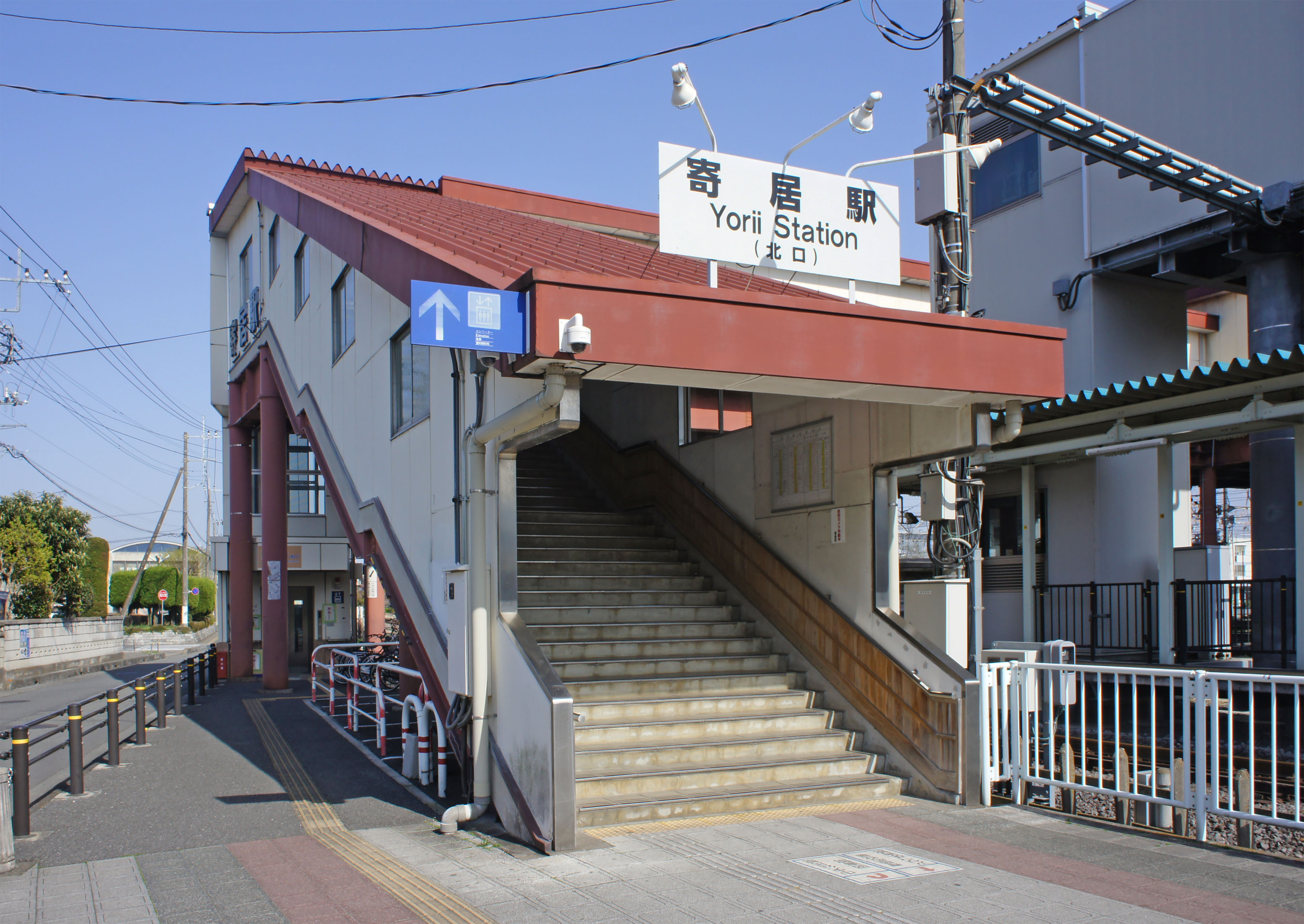
The north entrance in April 2022

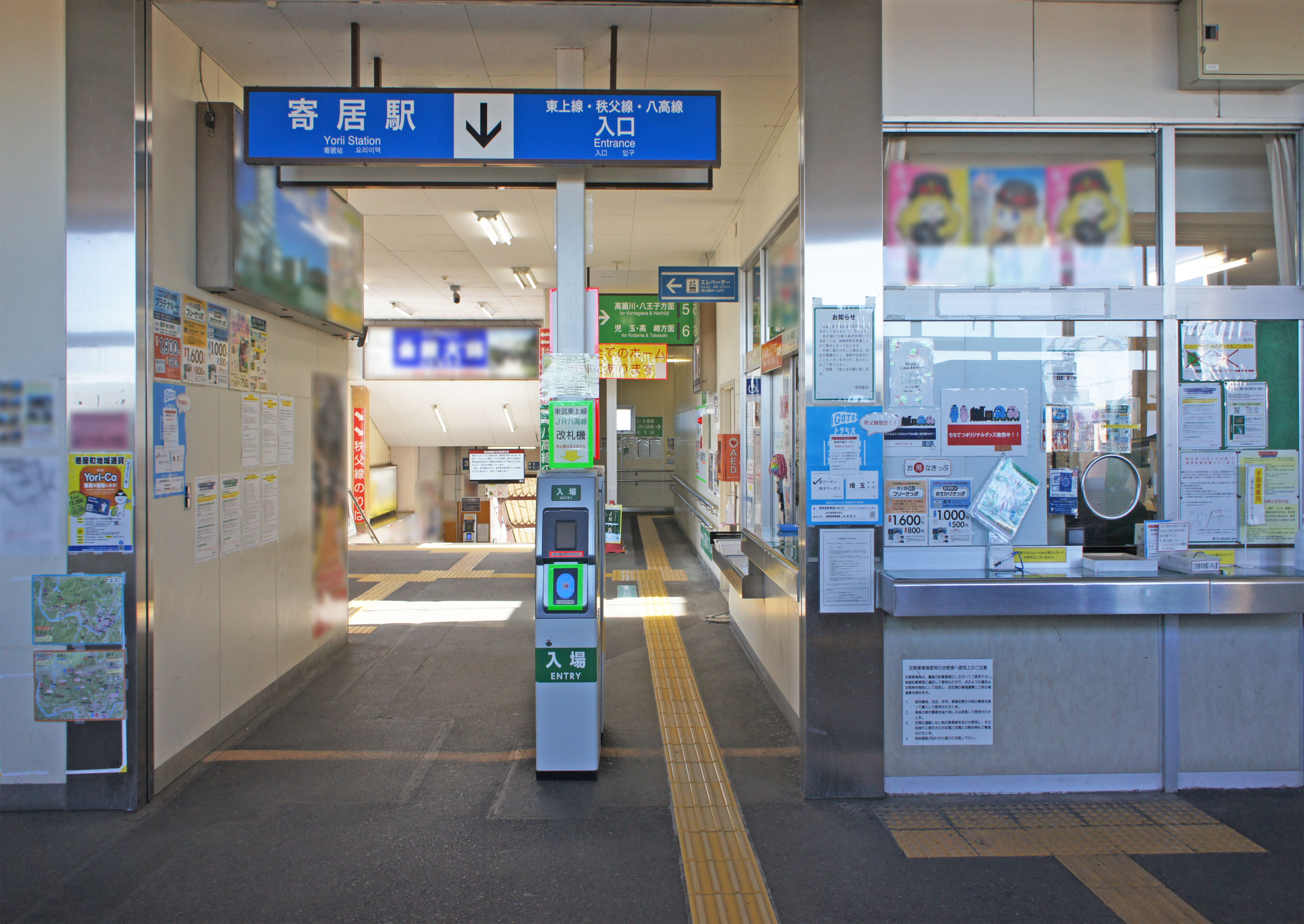
The IC card touch-in point at the shared entrance to the platforms in January 2022

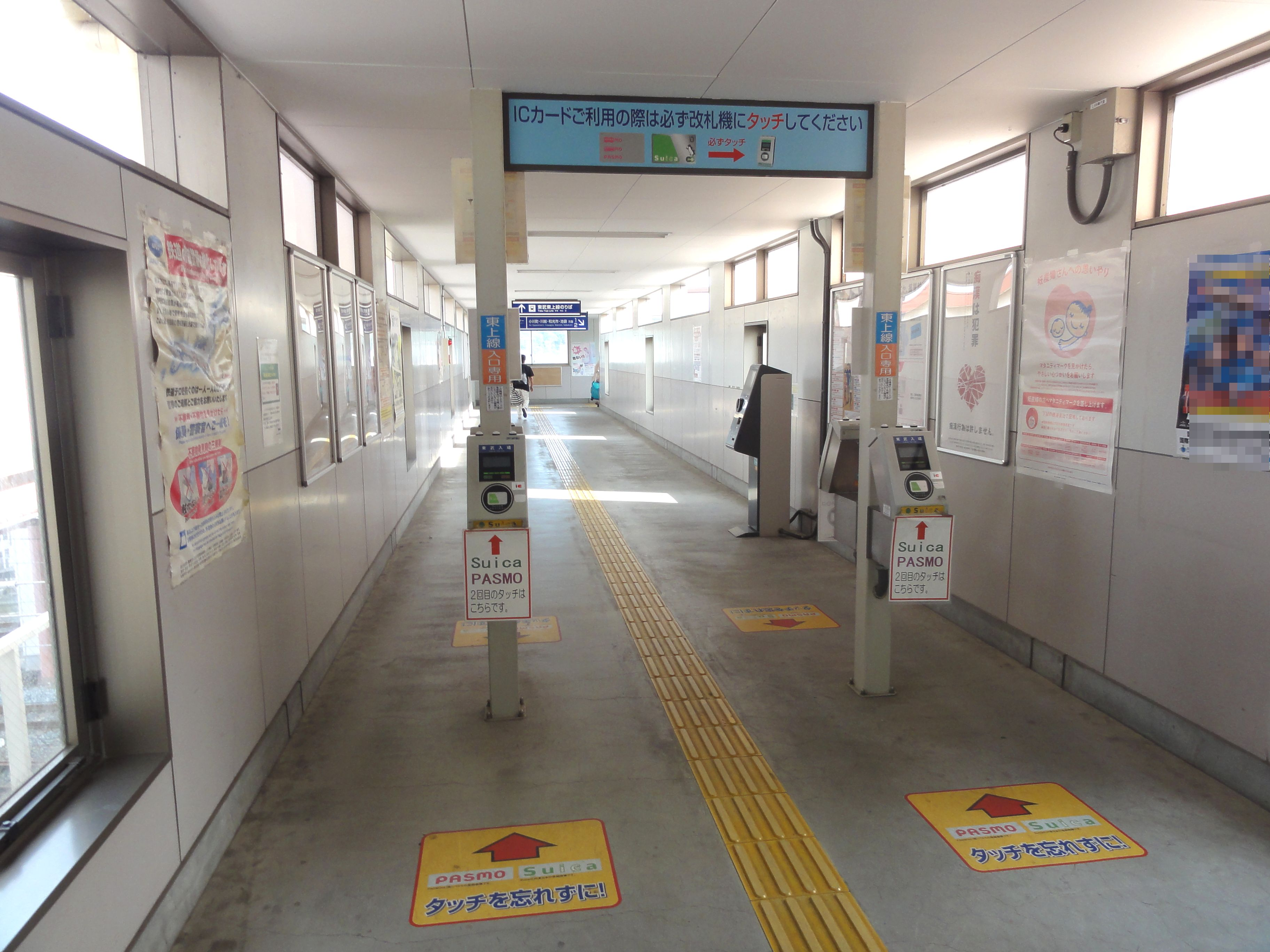
The additional IC card touch-in point at the entrance to the Tōbu platforms in June 2013

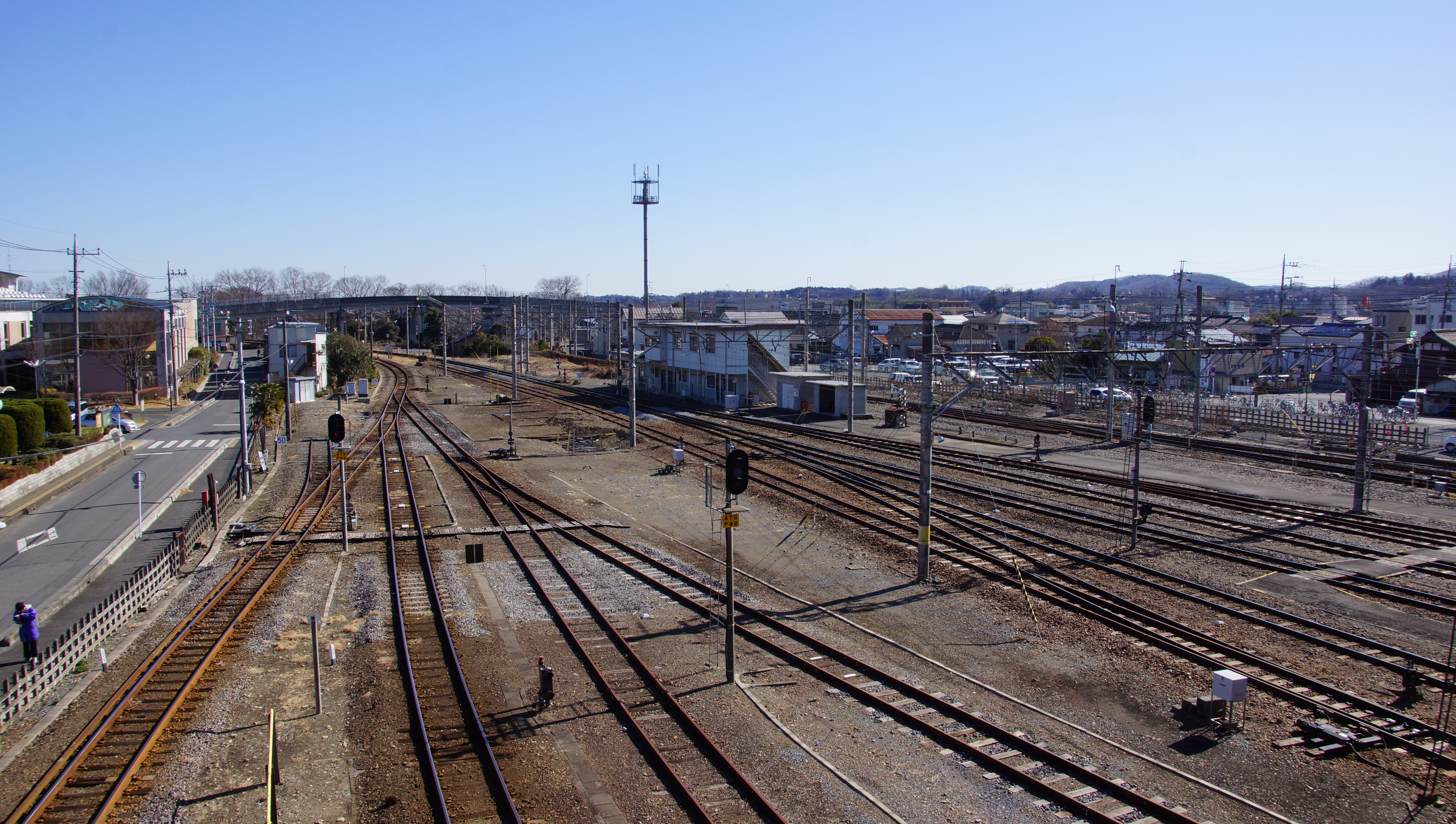
The view looking east from the station footbridge in February 2017

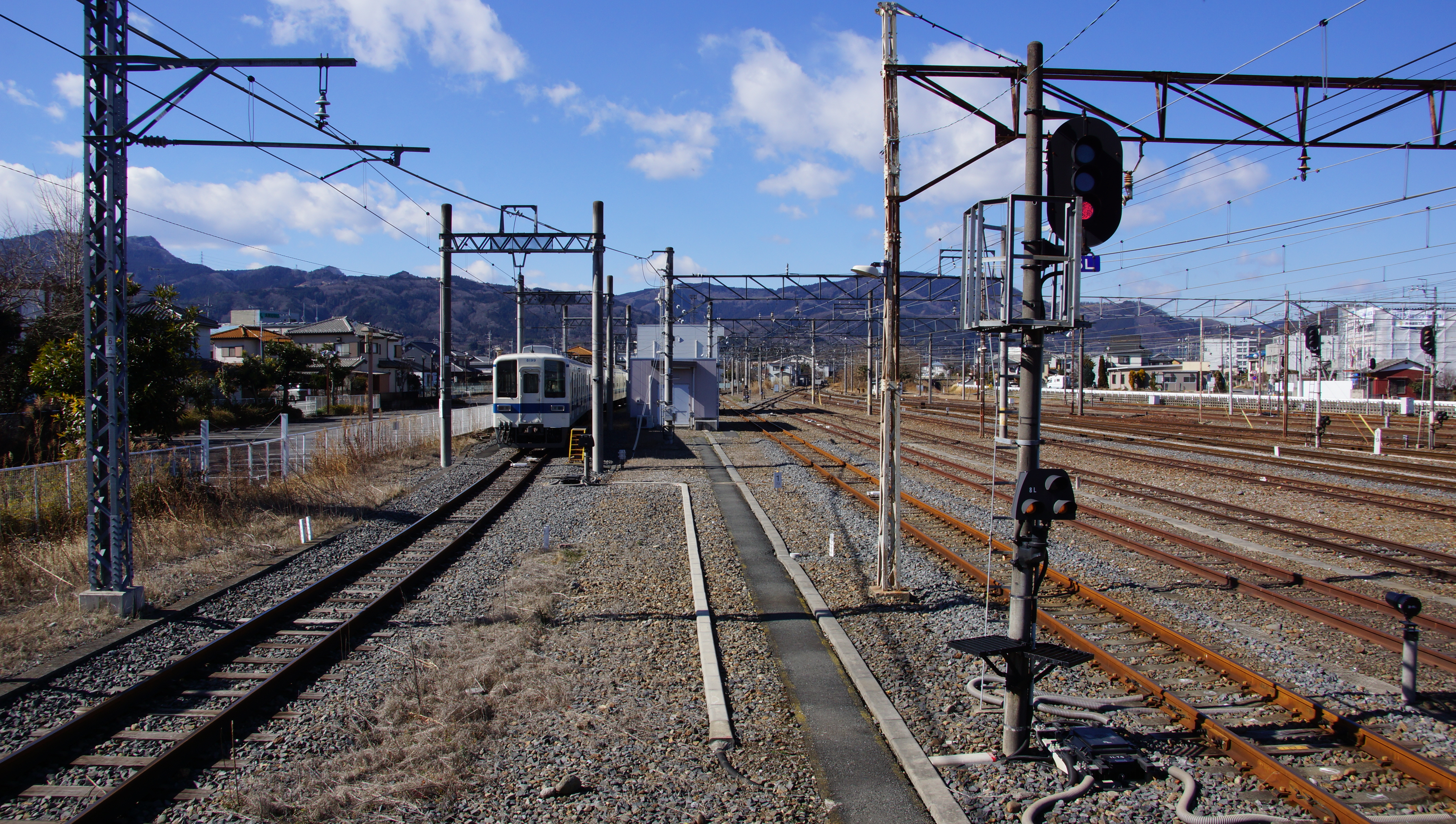
The view looking west from the Tōbu platform in February 2017, with an 8000 series train stabled

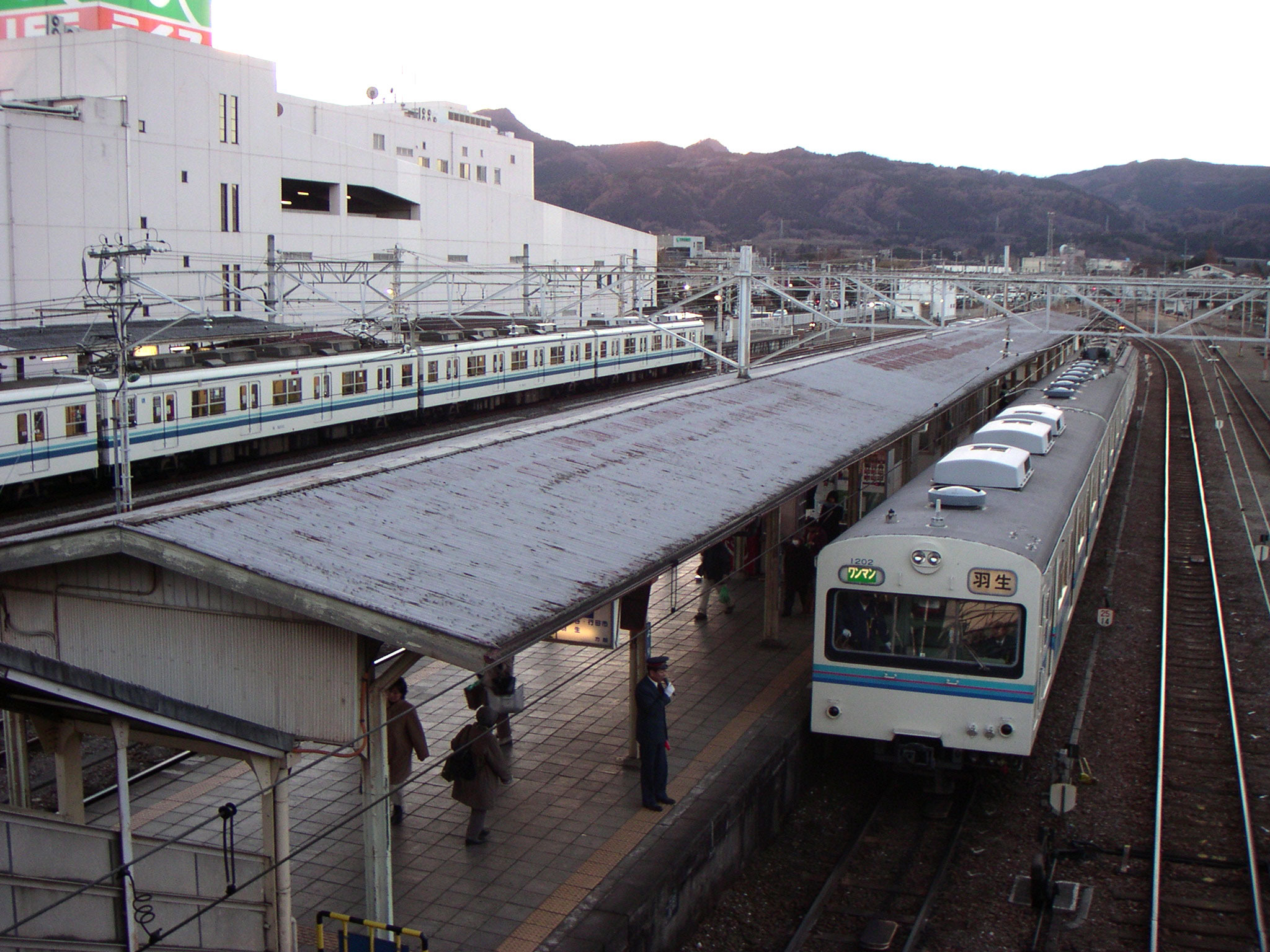
View of the station looking west in January 2006, with the Tōbu platforms on the left, Chichibu Railway platforms in the centre, and JR East platforms off-camera to the right

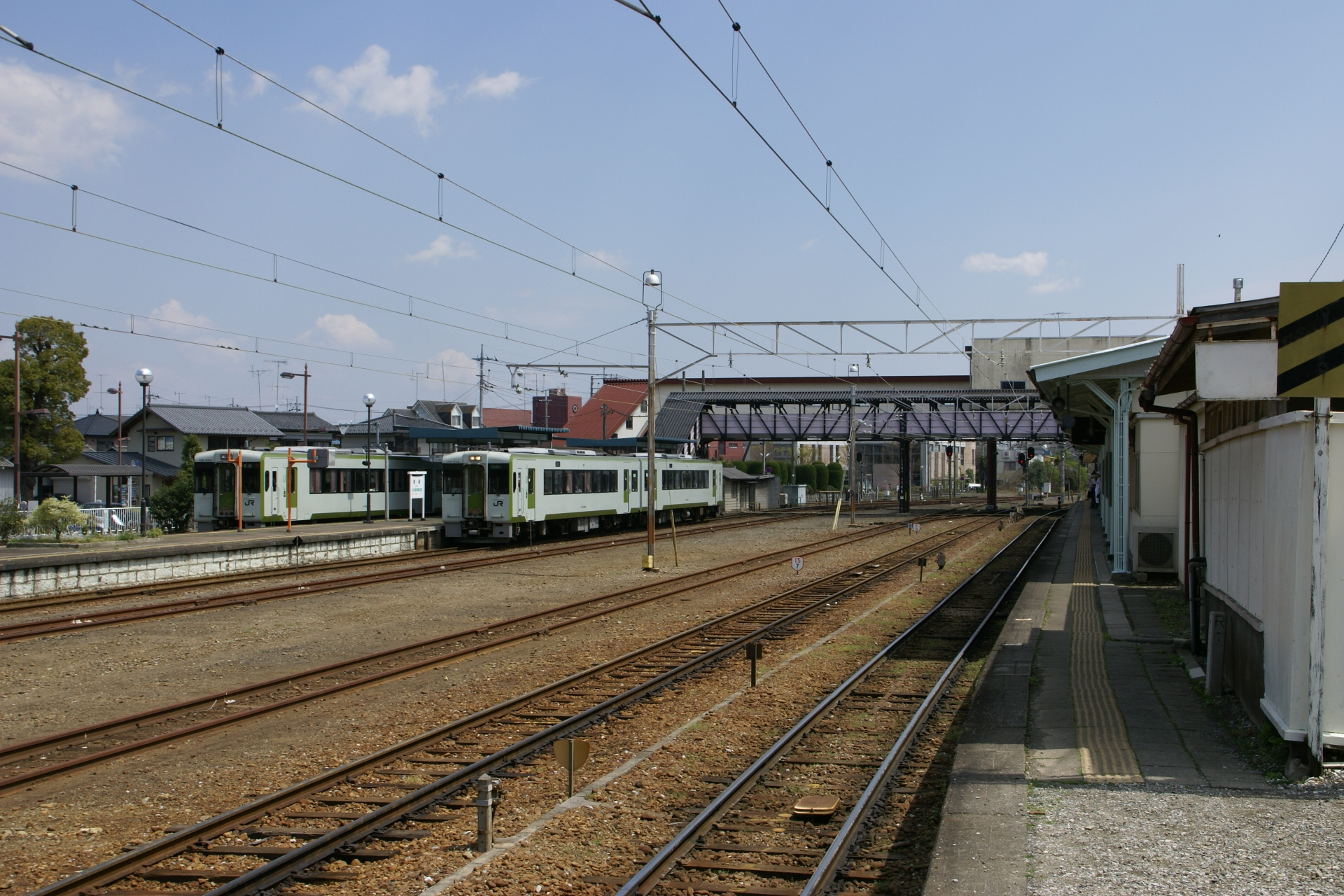
View of the JR Hachiko Line platforms with KiHa 110 DMUs crossing in April 2007

== History ==
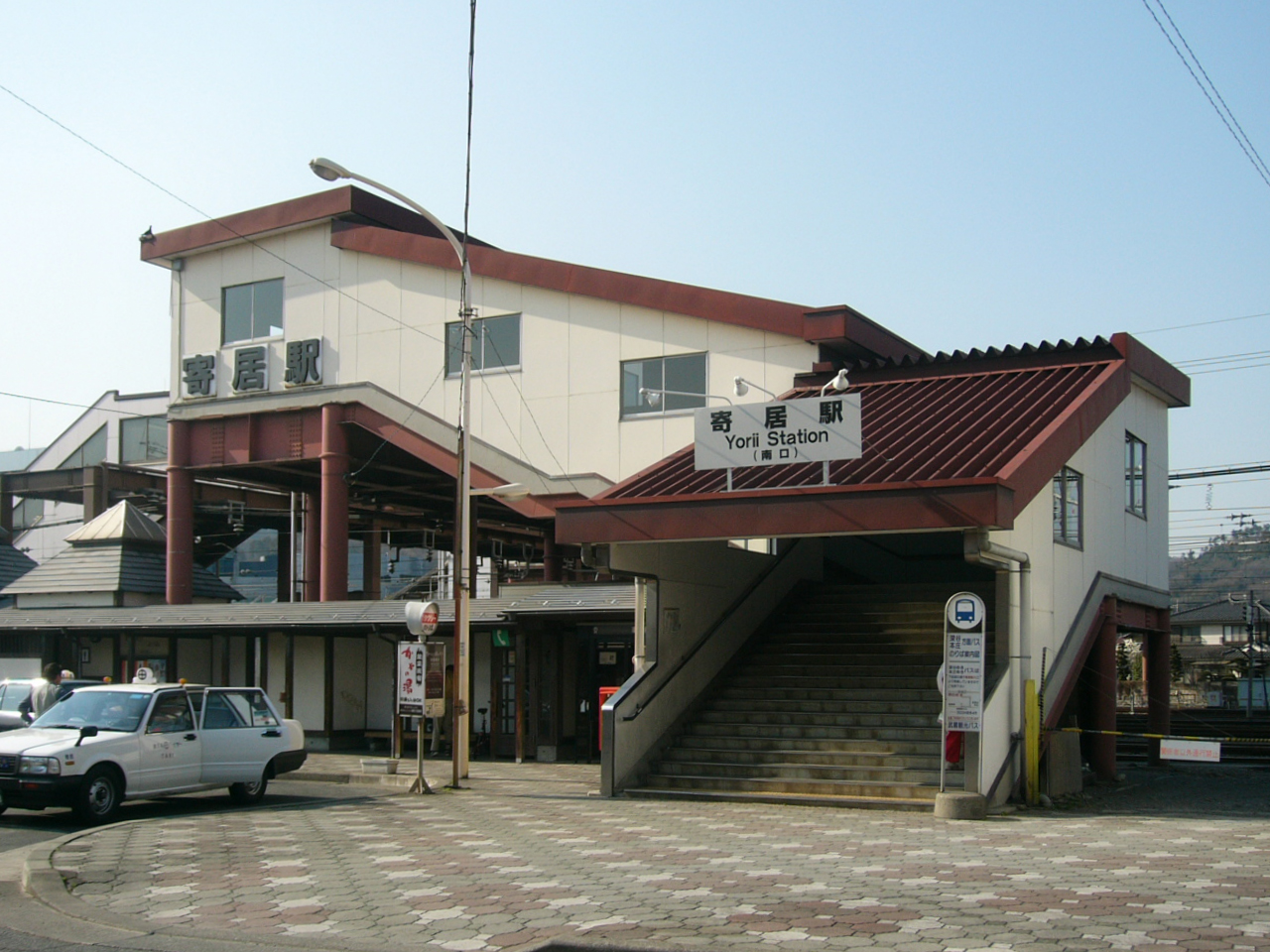
The south entrance in March 2006, before the addition of lifts

The station opened on October 7, 1901, as the terminus of the Jōbu Railway (present-day Chichibu Railway) from Kumagaya. From April 2, 1903, the Jōbu Railway line was extended from Yorii to Hagure.

The Tōbu Railway station opened on July 10, 1925, with the completion of the Tōjō Line from Ogawamachi.

The JR (former Japanese Government Railways) station opened on January 25, 1933, following the extension of the Hachikō Line from Kodama. The Hachikō Line was extended south to Ogawamachi on October 6, 1934.

From 17 March 2012, station numbering was introduced on the Tōbu Tōjō Line, with Yorii Station becoming "TJ-38".

== Passenger statistics ==
In fiscal 2019, the station was used by an average of 3,821 passengers daily. In fiscal 2019, the JR station was used by an average of 385 passengers daily (boarding passengers only). In fiscal 2017, the Chichibu Railway station was used by an average of 1380 passengers daily.。

== Surrounding area ==
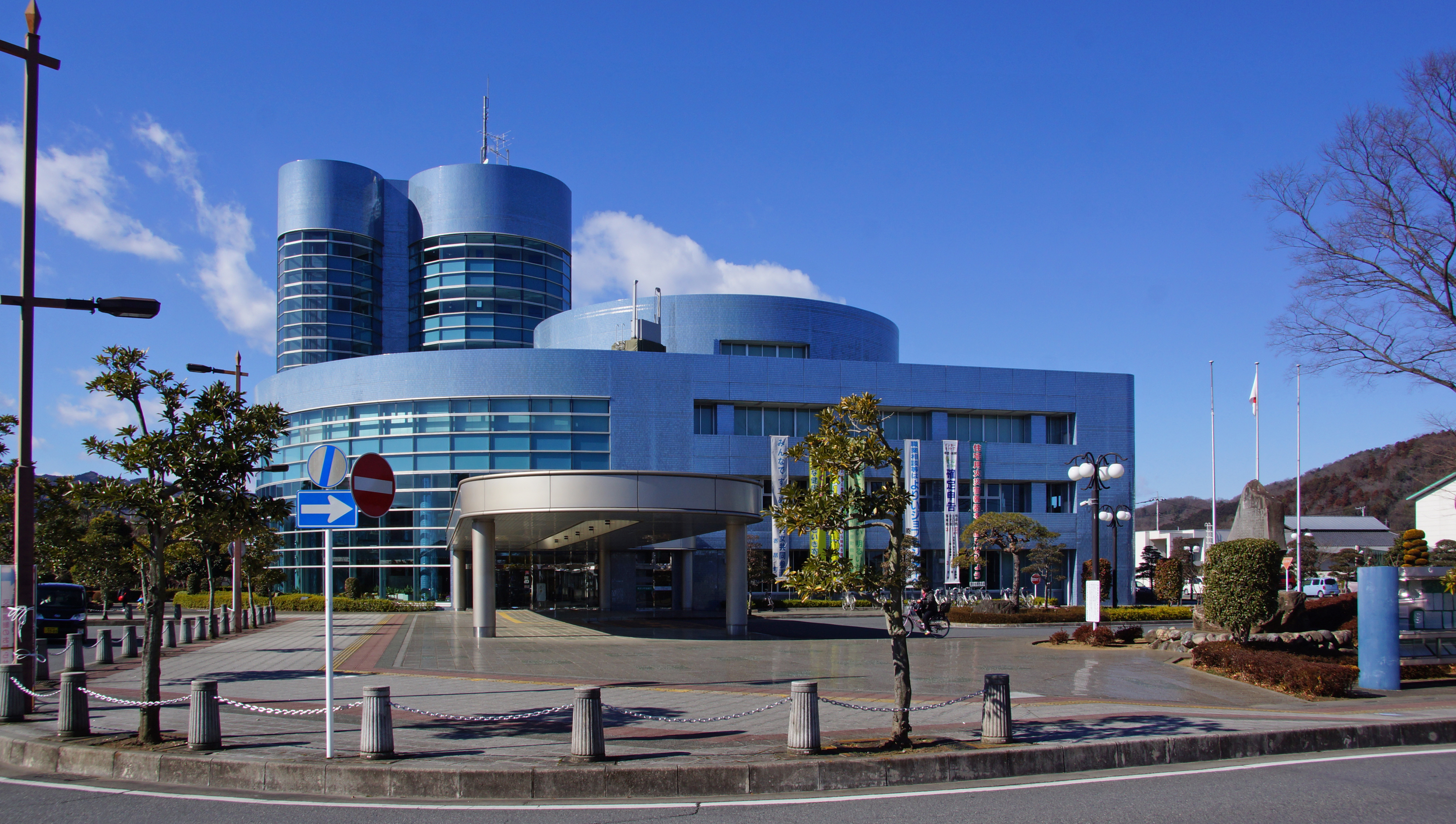
Yorii Town Office in February 2017

- Yorii Town Office
- Yorii Library

== Bus routes ==
- Musashi Kanko
  - For Honjō-Waseda Station and Honjō Station

== See also ==
- List of railway stations in Japan
