= Hanyū Station =

Railway station in Hanyū, Saitama Prefecture, Japan

TI07 CR01 Hanyū Station 羽生駅
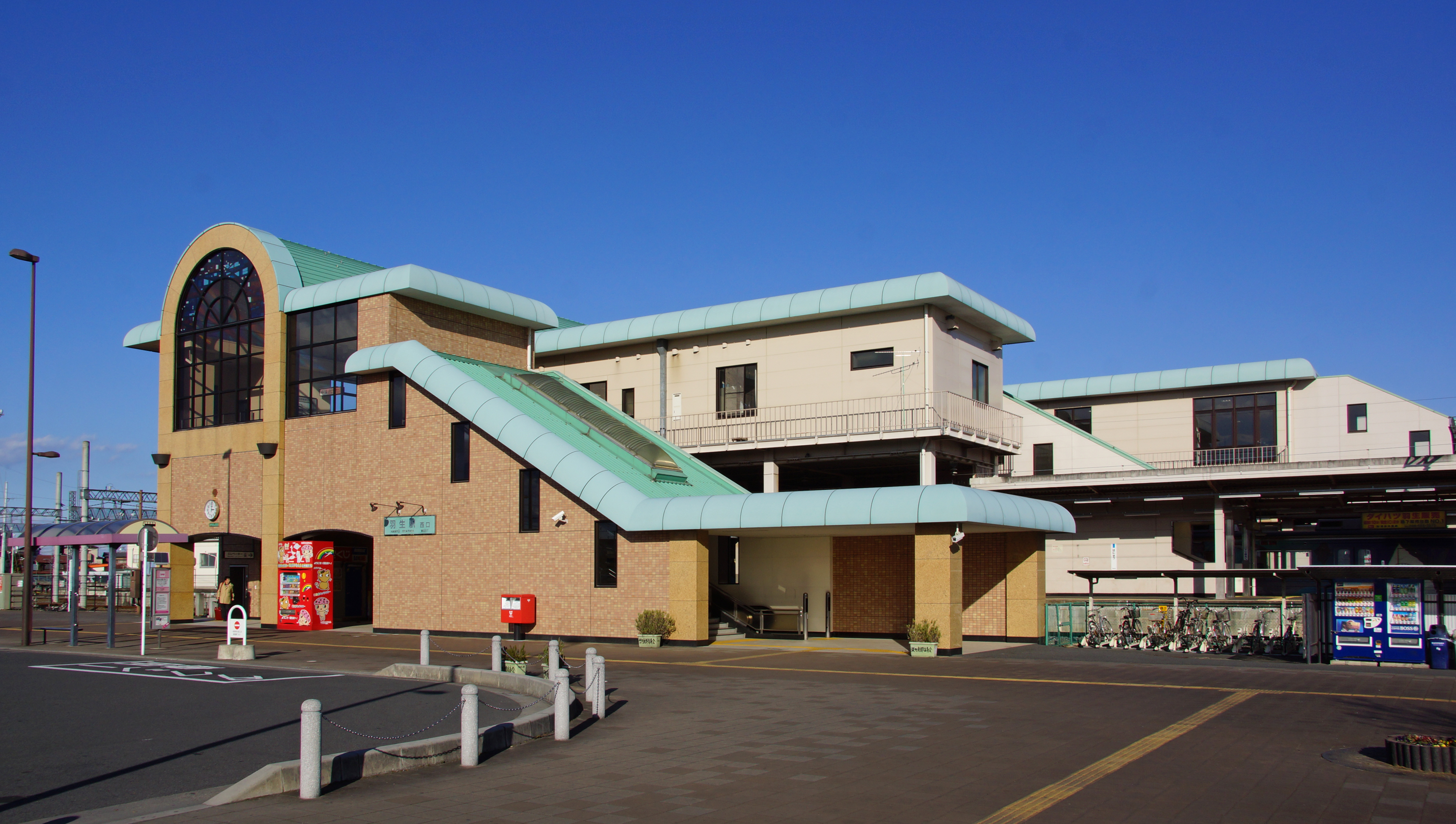
- Hanyū Station west entrance in January 2017

General information
- Location: 1-1-62 Minami, Hanyū-shi, Saitama-ken 348-0053; Japan
- Coordinates: 36°10′14″N 139°32′01″E
- Operator: Tōbu Railway; Chichibu Railway
- Lines: Tōbu Isesaki Line; ■ Chichibu Main Line
- Distance: 66.2 km from Asakusa
- Platforms: 3 island platforms
- Tracks: 6

Other information
- Station code: TI-07 (Tobu)

History
- Opened: 23 April 1903

Passengers
- FY2019: 13,591 daily (Tobu, FY2019); 4,804 daily (Chichibu, FY2018)

Services
Preceding station	Tobu Railway	Following station
Kazo TI05 towards Asakusa	Ryomo	Tatebayashi TI10 towards Kuzū, Akagi or Isesaki
Minami-Hanyū TI06 towards Tōbu-Dōbutsu-Kōen	Isesaki Line Section Express Section Semi Express	Kawamata TI08 towards Tatebayashi
Minami-Hanyū TI06 towards Tōbu-Dōbutsu-Kōen	Isesaki Line Local	Kawamata TI08 towards Isesaki
Preceding station	Chichibu Railway	Following station
Gyōdashi CR06 towards Mitsumineguchi	Chichibu Main Line Rapid Chichibuji	Terminus
Nishi-Hanyū CR02 towards Mitsumineguchi	Chichibu Main Line Local	Terminus
Location
- Location within Saitama Prefecture Location within Japan

Hanyū Station (羽生駅, Hanyū-eki) is an interchange passenger railway station in located in the city of Hanyū, Saitama, Japan, jointly operated by the private railway operators Tōbu Railway and Chichibu Railway.

== Lines ==
Hanyū Station is served by the Tōbu Isesaki Line from Asakusa in Tokyo, and is located 66.2 km from the Asakusa terminus. It also forms the eastern terminus of the 71.7 km Chichibu Main Line to Mitsumineguchi.

== Station layout ==
The station consists of three island platforms serving four Tōbu tracks (numbered 1 to 4) and two Chichibu Line tracks (numbered 4 to 5).

=== Platforms ===
1/2	Tōbu Isesaki Line	for Kuki, Kasukabe, Kita-Senju, and Asakusa
3/4	Tōbu Isesaki Line	for Tatebayashi and Ōta
4/5	Chichibu Main Line	for Gyōdashi, Kumagaya, Yorii, Chichibu, and Mitsumineguchi

Note that the platforms labeled 4 are in fact two distinct platforms operated by two different companies.

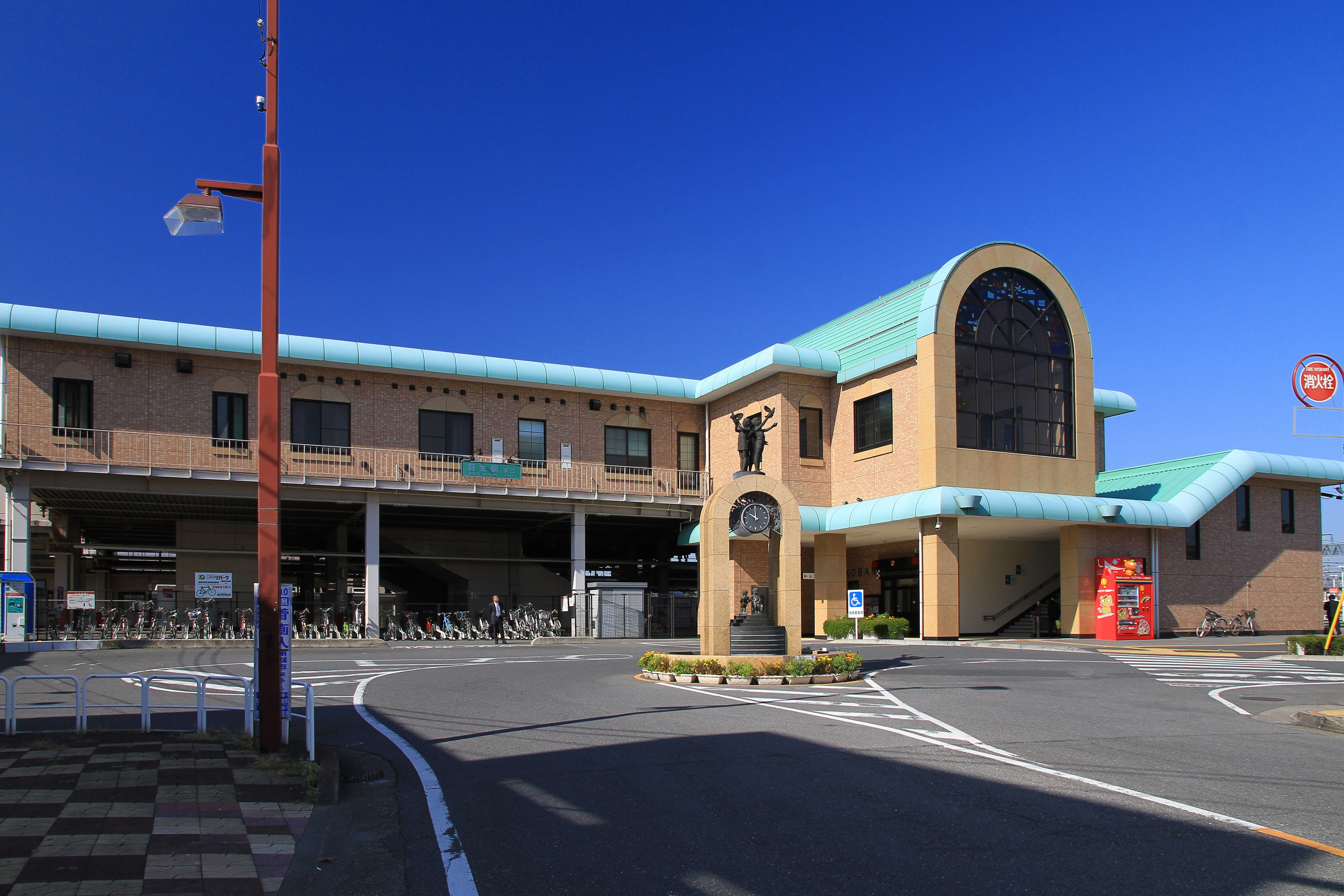
The east side in October 2012

An overview of the station platforms in September 2014 looking north, with the Chichibu Railway platforms on the left

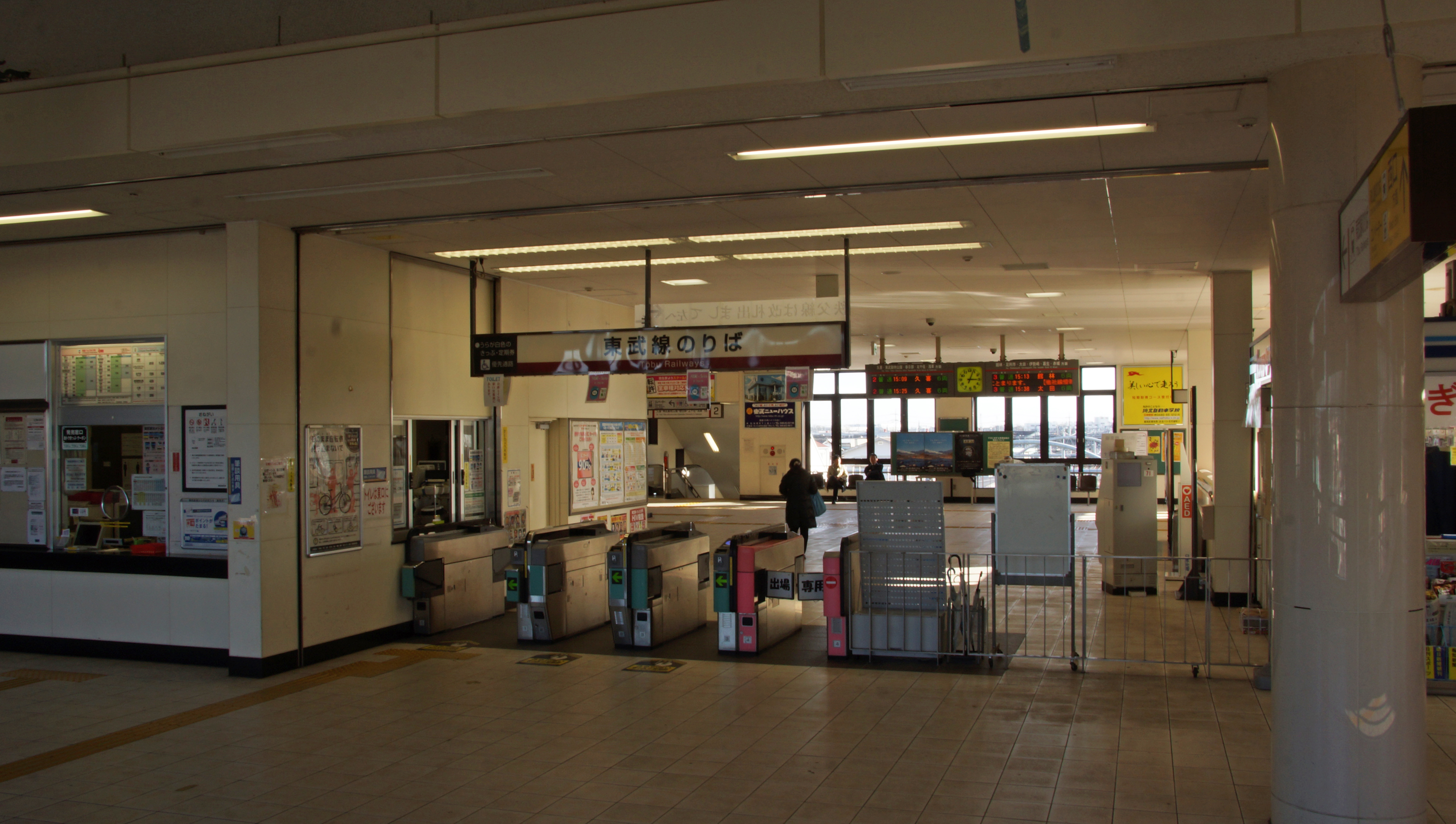
The Tōbu Railway ticket barriers in January 2017

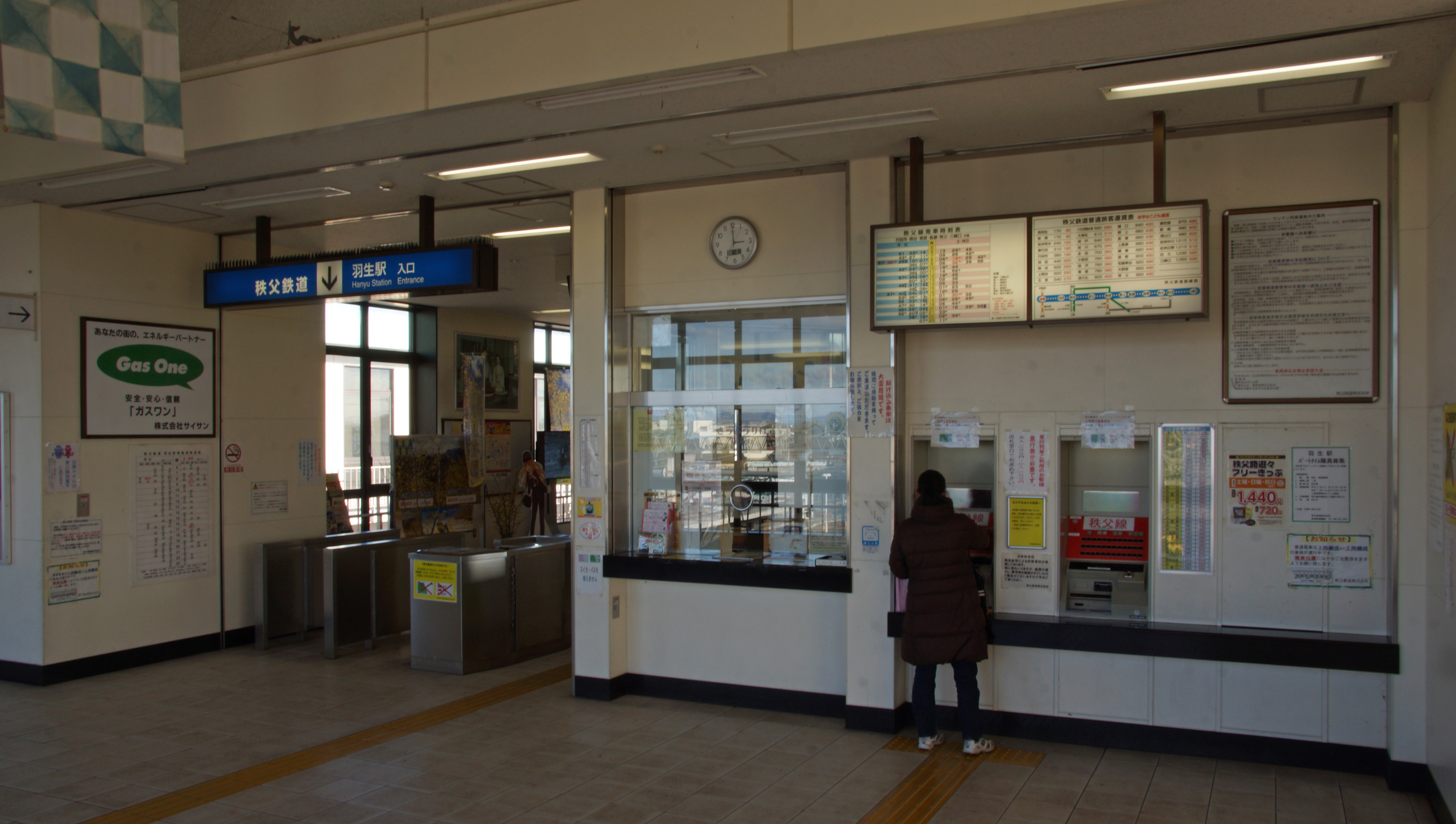
The Chichibu Railway ticket barriers in January 2017

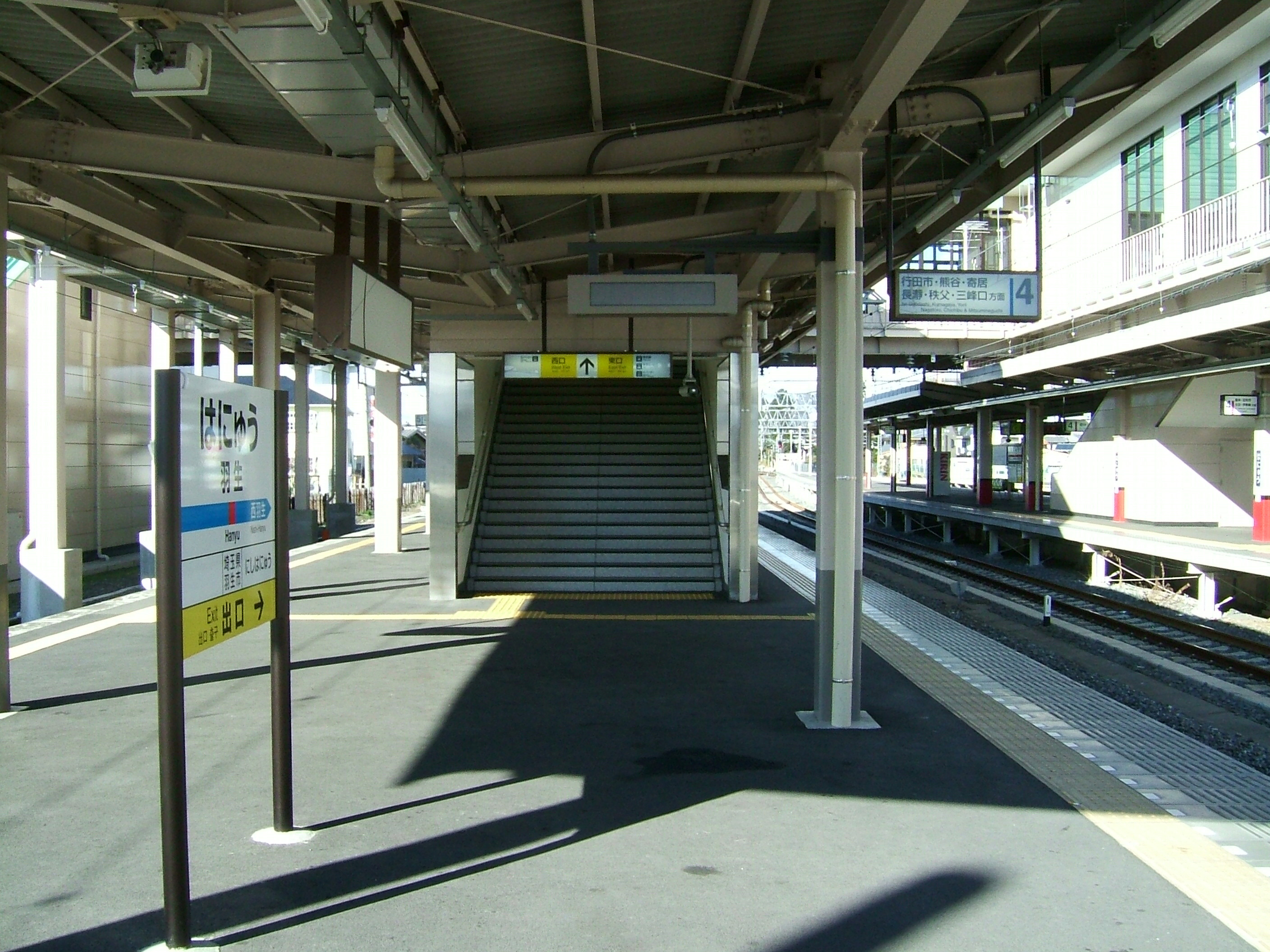
The Chichibu Line platforms in January 2008

== History ==
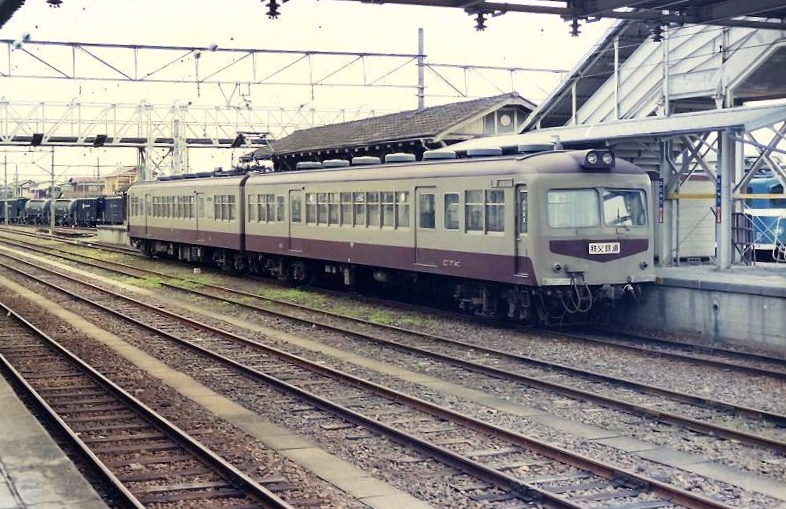
A Chichibu Railway train at Hanyu Station in 1984

The Tōbu station opened on 23 April 1903. The Hokubu Railway opened between Hanyu and Gyōdashi on 1 April 1921, with the Hokubu Railway being absorbed into the Chichibu Railway in 1922.

The station was rebuilt with the station building located over the tracks, formally completed on 22 October 2004.

From the start of the revised timetable on 18 March 2006, a new up track was added on the east side of the station to allow non-stop trains to pass, and the Tobu platforms were renumbered accordingly.

From 17 March 2012, station numbering was introduced on all Tōbu lines, with Hanyū Station becoming "TI-07".

== Passenger statistics ==
In fiscal 2019, the Tōbu station was used by an average of 13,591 passengers daily (boarding passengers only). and the Chichibu Railway station was used by an average of 4,804 passengers daily in fiscal 2018.

== Surrounding area ==
- Hanyū City Office
- Saitama Junshin Junior College
- Saitama Prefectural Hanyū High School
- National Route 122

== See also ==
- List of railway stations in Japan
