= 7500 series =

7500 series may refer to:

- Chichibu Railway 7500 series, a Japanese train type
- Hokuso 7500 series, a Japanese train type
- ICL 7500 series, a range of terminals and workstations developed by ICL
