= 7800 =

7800 may refer to:

== Technology ==
- Atari 7800, a third-generation video game console
- GeForce 7800 series, a line of graphics processing units from Nvidia
- Radeon HD 7800 series, a line of graphics processing units from AMD released 2012
- Radeon RX 7800 XT, a graphics processing unit from AMD released 2023

== Other ==
- 7800, the 800th year of the 8th millennium
- NGC 7800, an irregular galaxy in the constellation Pegasus
- PCC 7800, a streetcar type

== See also ==
- 7800 series
