= Chichibu Railway 7500 series =

Class of 7 Japanese 3-car electric multiple units

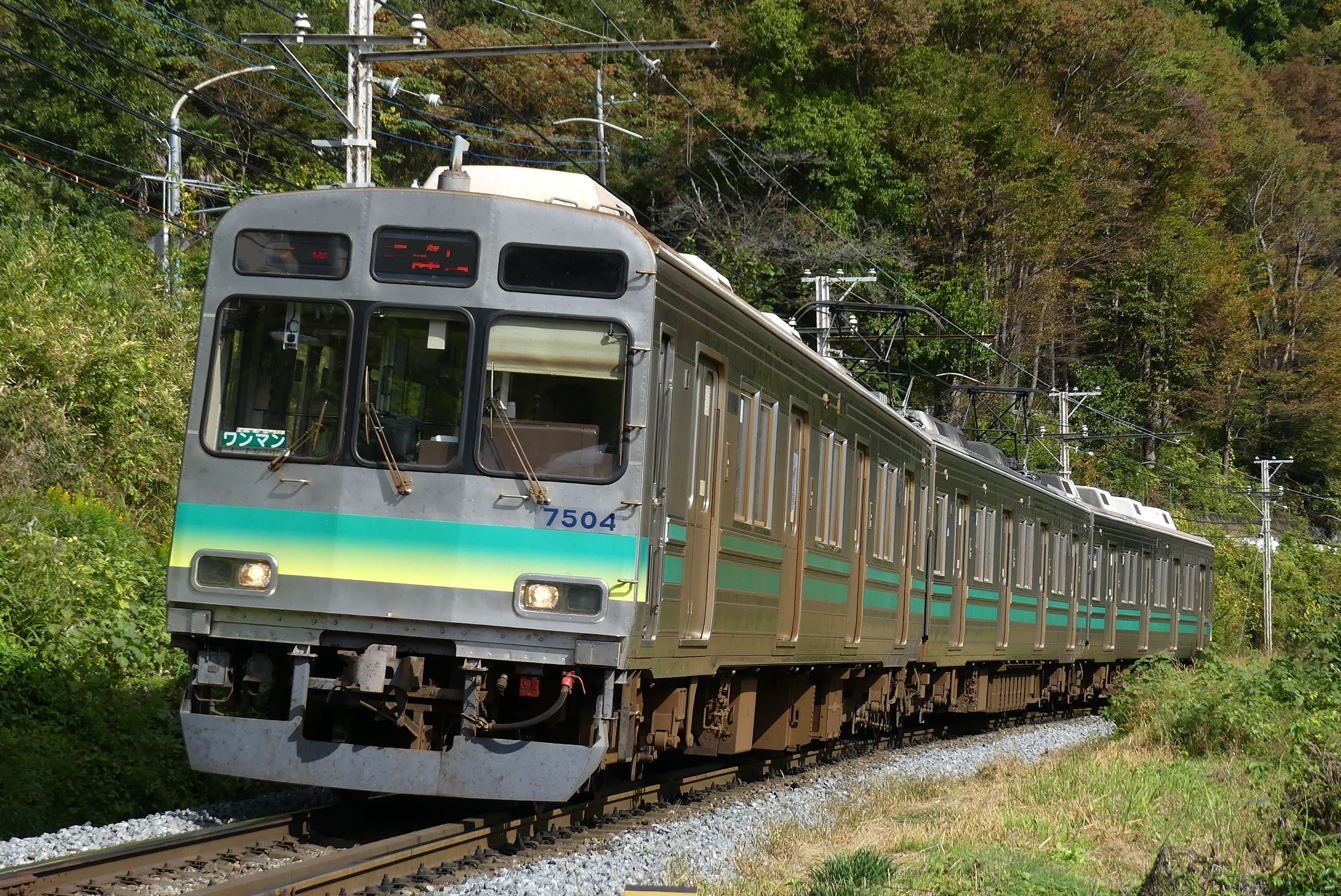
- Set 7504 in October 2018
- Manufacturer: Tokyu Car Corporation
- Replaced: 1000 series
- Entered service: March 2010
- Number built: 21 vehicles (7 sets)
- Number in service: 21 vehicles (7 sets)
- Formation: 3 cars per trainset
- Operator: Chichibu Railway
- Depot: Kumagaya
- Line served: Chichibu Main Line

Specifications
- Car body construction: Stainless steel
- Car length: 20,000 mm (65 ft 7 in)
- Width: 2,800 mm (9 ft 2 in)
- Doors: 4 pairs per side
- Maximum speed: 80 km/h (50 mph)
- Electric system: 1,500 V DC
- Current collection: Overhead wire
- Track gauge: 1,067 mm (3 ft 6 in)

The Chichibu Railway 7500 series (秩父鉄道7500系) is an electric multiple unit (EMU) train type for Chichibu Main Line local services on the Chichibu Main Line operated by the private railway operator Chichibu Railway in Japan since March 2010.

== Overview ==
The three-car trains were converted from former Tokyu 8090 series cars. Conversion details include modifications for wanman driver-only operation, the addition of passenger door control buttons, and the replacement of the previous single-arm pantograph with two lozenge-type pantographs on the DeHa 7600 car.

== Formations ==
As of 1 April 2014, the fleet consists of seven three-car sets, formed as follows, with two motored ("M") cars and one non-powered trailer ("T") car. The DeHa 7500 car is at the Mitsumineguchi (west) end.

Designation	Mc	M	Tc
Numbering	7500	7601	7700

The DeHa 7600 car is fitted with two lozenge-type pantographs.

== History ==
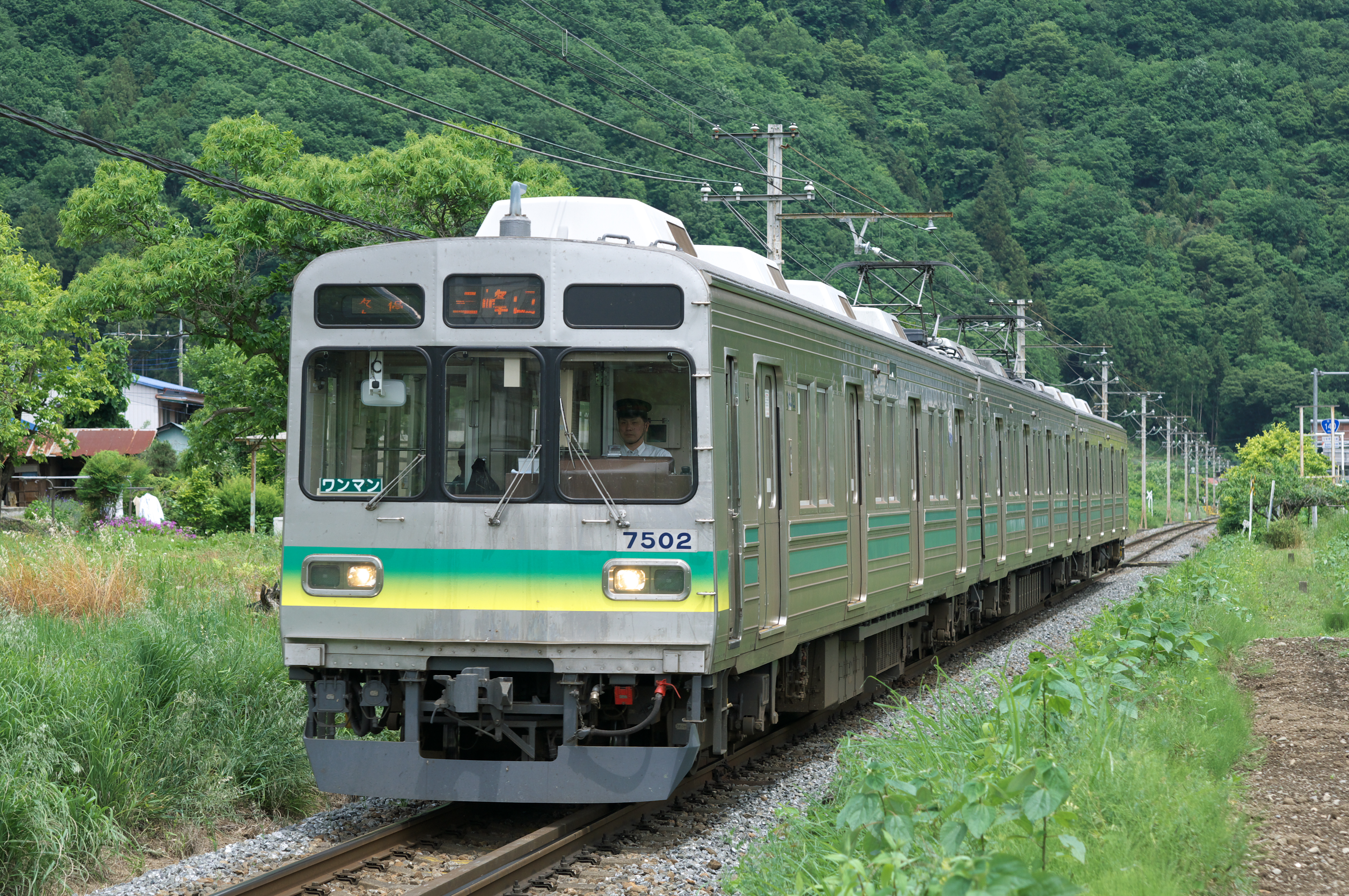
Set 7502 in May 2011

The first three-car train, 7501, entered service on 25 March 2010.

A second three-car set, 7502, was delivered in October 2010, and entered revenue service from 24 December 2010.

== Build details ==
The conversion histories and former identities of the fleet are as shown below.

Set No.	Car No.	Tokyu numbering	Conversion date
7501	DeHa 7501	KuHa 8092	25 March 2010
7501	DeHa 7601	DeHa 8192	25 March 2010
7501	KuHa 7701	KuHa 8091	25 March 2010
7502	DeHa 7502	KuHa 8083	24 December 2010
7502	DeHa 7602	DeHa 8184	24 December 2010
7502	KuHa 7702	KuHa 8084	24 December 2010
7503	DeHa 7503	KuHa 8085	28 February 2011
7503	DeHa 7603	DeHa 8186	28 February 2011
7503	KuHa 7703	KuHa 8086	28 February 2011
7504	DeHa 7504	KuHa 8093	21 November 2011
7504	DeHa 7604	DeHa 8194	21 November 2011
7504	KuHa 7704	KuHa 8094	21 November 2011
7505	DeHa 7505	KuHa 8087	16 December 2011
7505	DeHa 7605	DeHa 8188	16 December 2011
7505	KuHa 7705	KuHa 8088	16 December 2011
7506	DeHa 7506	KuHa 8095	12 March 2012
7506	DeHa 7606	DeHa 8196	12 March 2012
7506	KuHa 7706	KuHa 8096	12 March 2012
7507	DeHa 7507	KuHa 8089	21 November 2013
7507	DeHa 7607	DeHa 8190	21 November 2013
7507	KuHa 7707	KuHa 8090	21 November 2013

== Special liveries ==
From September until November 2014, set 7502 carried a special "Geo Park Train" livery featuring wildlife formerly associated with the area.
