= Chichibu Railway 7800 series =

Class of 4 Japanese 2-car electric multiple units

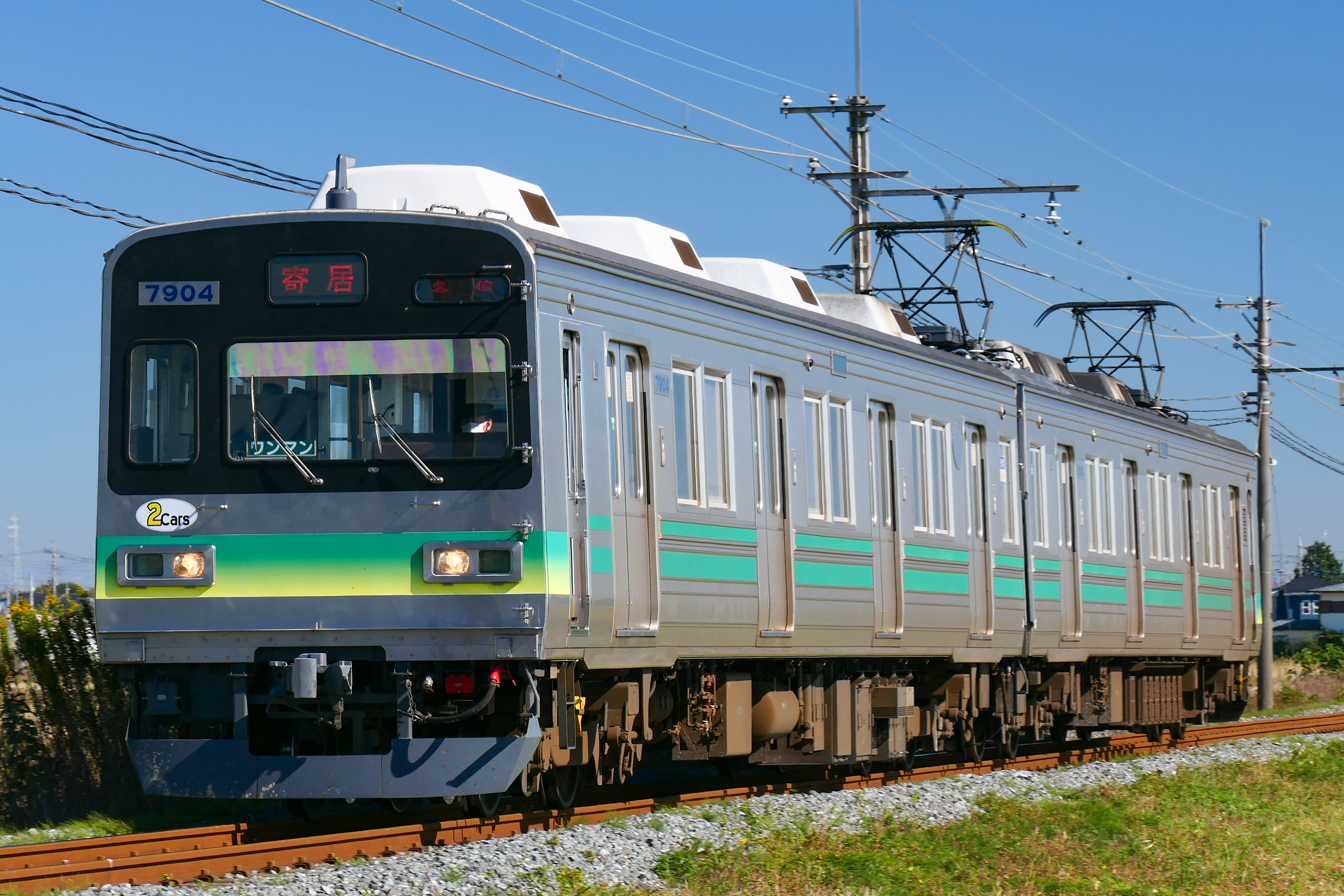
- Set 7804, October 2022
- In service: 16 March 2013 – present
- Manufacturer: Tokyu Car Corporation
- Replaced: 1000 series
- Number built: 8 vehicles (4 sets)
- Number in service: 8 vehicles (4 sets)
- Formation: 2 cars per trainset
- Fleet numbers: 7801–7804
- Operator: Chichibu Railway
- Depot: Kumagaya
- Line served: Chichibu Main Line

Specifications
- Car body construction: Stainless steel
- Car length: 20,000 mm (65 ft 7 in)
- Width: 2,800 mm (9 ft 2 in)
- Height: 4,123 mm (13 ft 6.3 in)
- Doors: 4 pairs per side
- Maximum speed: 80 km/h (50 mph)
- Electric system: 1,500 V DC
- Current collection: Overhead wire
- Bogies: TS-807 (motored), TS-815 (trailer)
- Safety system: ATS
- Track gauge: 1,067 mm (3 ft 6 in)

The Chichibu Railway 7800 series (秩父鉄道7800系) is a 2-car electric multiple unit (EMU) train type operated by the Japanese private railway operator Chichibu Railway on Chichibu Main Line local services since 16 March 2013.

== Overview ==
The first 2-car train was converted from former Tokyu 8090 series cars in 2012 by Tokyu Techo Systems. Conversion details include the removal of electrical equipment from one former motored car, the addition two lozenge-type pantographs on the DeHa 7800 car, and the addition of new cab ends.

== Formations ==
The 2-car sets are formed as follows, with one motored ("M") car and one non-powered trailer ("T") car. The DeHa 7800 car is at the Mitsumineguchi (west) end.

Designation	Mc	Tc
Numbering	7801	7901
Weight (t)	34.9	30.9
Capacity (Total/seated)	140/45	139/48

The DeHa 7800 car is fitted with two lozenge-type pantographs.

== History ==
The first set was rebuilt by Tokyu Techno Systems in December 2012. It entered service from the start of the revised timetable on 16 March 2013.

== Build details ==
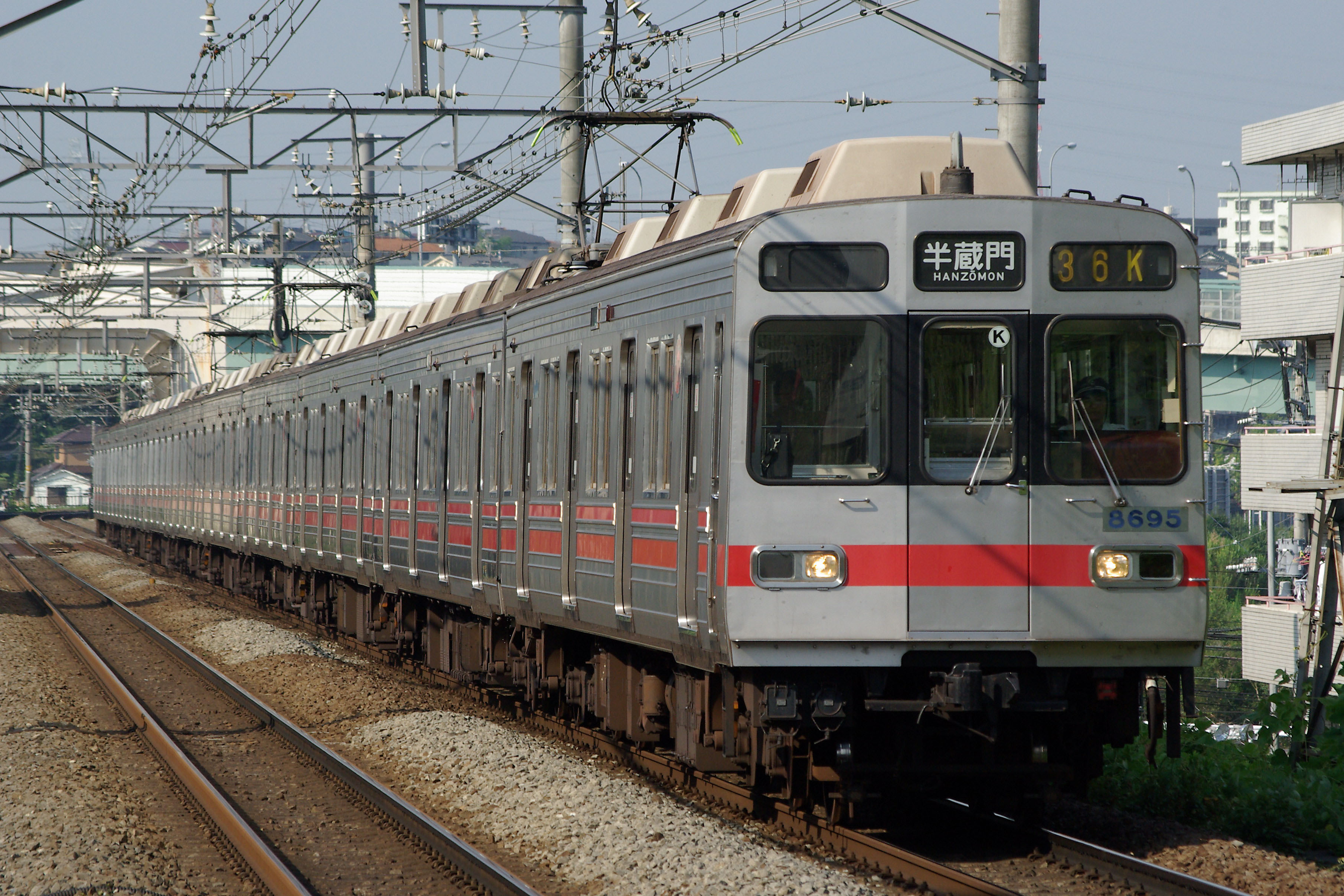
Tokyu 8090 series set

The conversion histories and former identities of the fleet are as shown below.

Set No.	Car No.	Tokyu numbering	Conversion date
7801	DeHa 7801	DeHa 8490	15 March 2013
7801	KuHa 7901	DeHa 8290	15 March 2013
7802	DeHa 7802	DeHa 8494	15 November 2013
7802	KuHa 7902	DeHa 8298	15 November 2013
7803	DeHa 7803	DeHa 8496	24 February 2014
7803	KuHa 7903	DeHa 8282	24 February 2014
7804	DeHa 7804	DeHa 8495	20 March 2014
7804	KuHa 7904	DeHa 8280	20 March 2014
