= Keisei 3000 series =

Japanese train type

Keisei 3000/3050 series
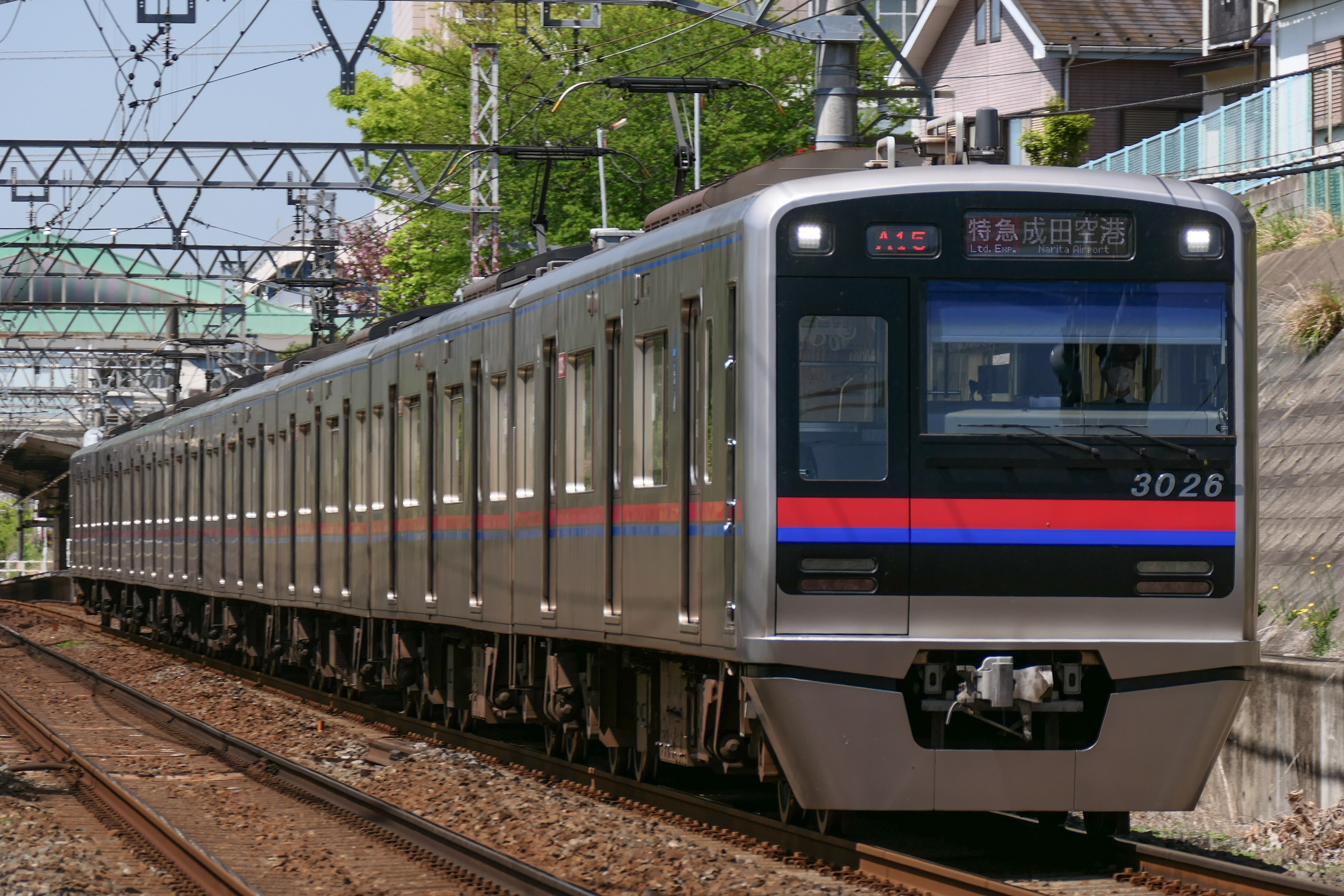
- 8-car set 3026, April 2022
- In service: 2003–present
- Manufacturers: J-TREC, Nippon Sharyo, Tokyu Car Corporation
- Replaced: 3200 series
- Constructed: 2002–2019
- Entered service: 1 February 2003
- Number built: 326 vehicles (48 sets) (as of February 2019)
- Number in service: 252 vehicles (38 sets) (as of 1 April 2016)
- Formation: 6/8 cars per trainset
- Fleet numbers: 3001–3042, 3051–3056
- Capacity: 776 passengers (6-car); 1,042 passengers (8-car)
- Operator: Keisei Electric Railway
- Lines served: Keisei Main Line; Keisei Higashi-Narita Line; Keisei Chiba Line; Keisei Chihara Line; Narita Sky Access Line; Keisei Oshiage Line; Hokuso Line; Shibayama Railway Line; Toei Asakusa Line; Keikyu Main Line; Keikyu Airport Line; Keikyu Kurihama Line

Specifications
- Car body construction: Stainless steel
- Car length: 18,000 mm (59 ft 1 in)
- Width: 2,768 mm (9 ft 1 in)
- Height: 4,050 mm (13 ft 3 in)
- Doors: 3 pairs per side
- Maximum speed: Design: 120 / 130 km/h (75 / 81 mph)
- Traction system: Variable frequency (IGBT/SiC)
- Acceleration: 3.5 km/(h⋅s) (2.2 mph/s)
- Deceleration: 4.0 km/(h⋅s) (2.5 mph/s) (service); 4.5 km/(h⋅s) (2.8 mph/s) (emergency)
- Electric systems: Overhead line, 1,500 V DC
- Current collection: Single-arm pantograph
- Bogies: FS-564 (motored), FS-064 (trailer)
- Safety system: ATS
- Track gauge: 1,435 mm (4 ft 8 1/2 in)

The Keisei 3000 series (京成3000形) and the related Keisei 3050 series (京成3050形) are DC electric multiple unit (EMU) train types operated by the private railway operator Keisei Electric Railway on commuter services in the Tokyo area of Japan since 2003. A total of 19 eight-car sets and 29 six-car sets have been built by J-TREC (formerly Tokyu Car Corporation) and Nippon Sharyo between 2002 and 2019.

== Operations ==
The eight-car sets are used on inter-running services via the Toei Asakusa Line to and from the Keikyu Main Line.

Seventh-batch eight-car sets (referred to as the 3050 series) are primarily used on the Narita Sky Access Line.

== Formations ==
As of 1 April 2016, the fleet consists of 12 eight-car sets (3001, 3026 to 3030, and 3051 to 3056) and 26 six-car sets (3002 to 3025 and 3031 to 3032) formed as shown below. Car 6/8 is at the Narita Airport end.

=== 8-car sets ===
Car No.	1	2	3	4	5	6	7	8
Designation	M2cN	M1N	TN	M2	M1'	TS	M1S	M2cS
Numbering	30xx-1	30xx-2	30xx-3	30xx-4	30xx-5	30xx-6	30xx-7	30xx-8
Weight (t)	33.0	33.0	27.0	30.0	32.0	27.0	33.0	33.0
Capacity (total/seated)	122/43	133/52	133/52	133/52	133/52	133/52	133/52	122/43

- "xx" corresponds to the set number.
- Cars 2 and 7 each have two single-arm pantographs, and car 5 is fitted with one.

=== 6-car sets ===
Car No.	1	2	3	4	5	6
Designation	M2cN	M1N	TN	TS	M1S	M2cS
Numbering	30xx-1	30xx-2	30xx-3	30xx-6	30xx-7	30xx-8
Weight (t)	33.0	27.0	27.0	27.0	33.0	33.0
Capacity (total/seated)	122/43	133/52	133/52	133/52	133/52	122/43

- "xx" corresponds to the set number.
- Cars 2 and 5 each have two single-arm pantographs.

== Interior ==
Seating accommodation consists of longitudinal bench seating throughout. From 31 March 2013, WiMAX wireless broadband internet access was provided on all sets numbered 3051 onward.

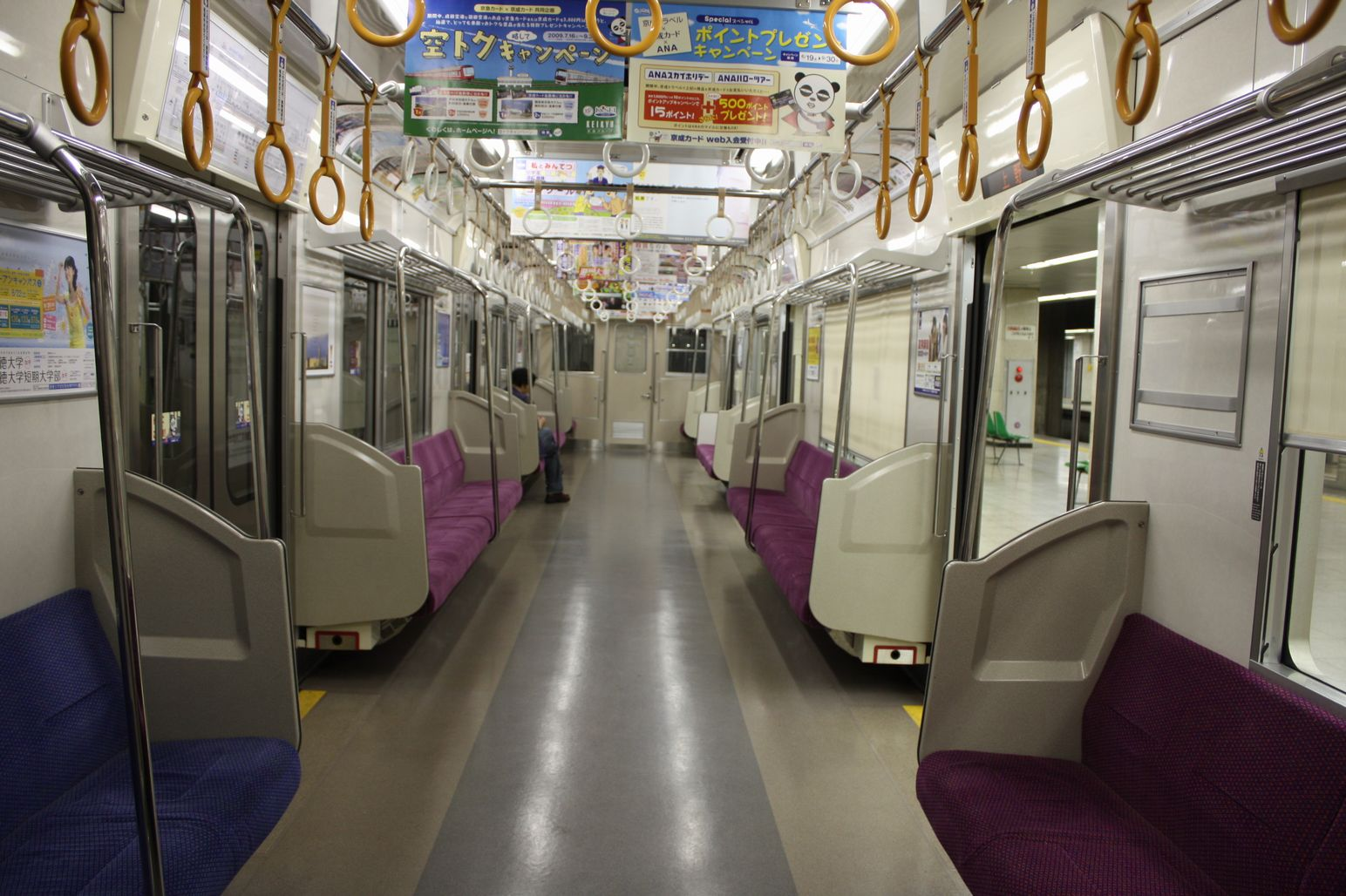
Interior view (3000 series)

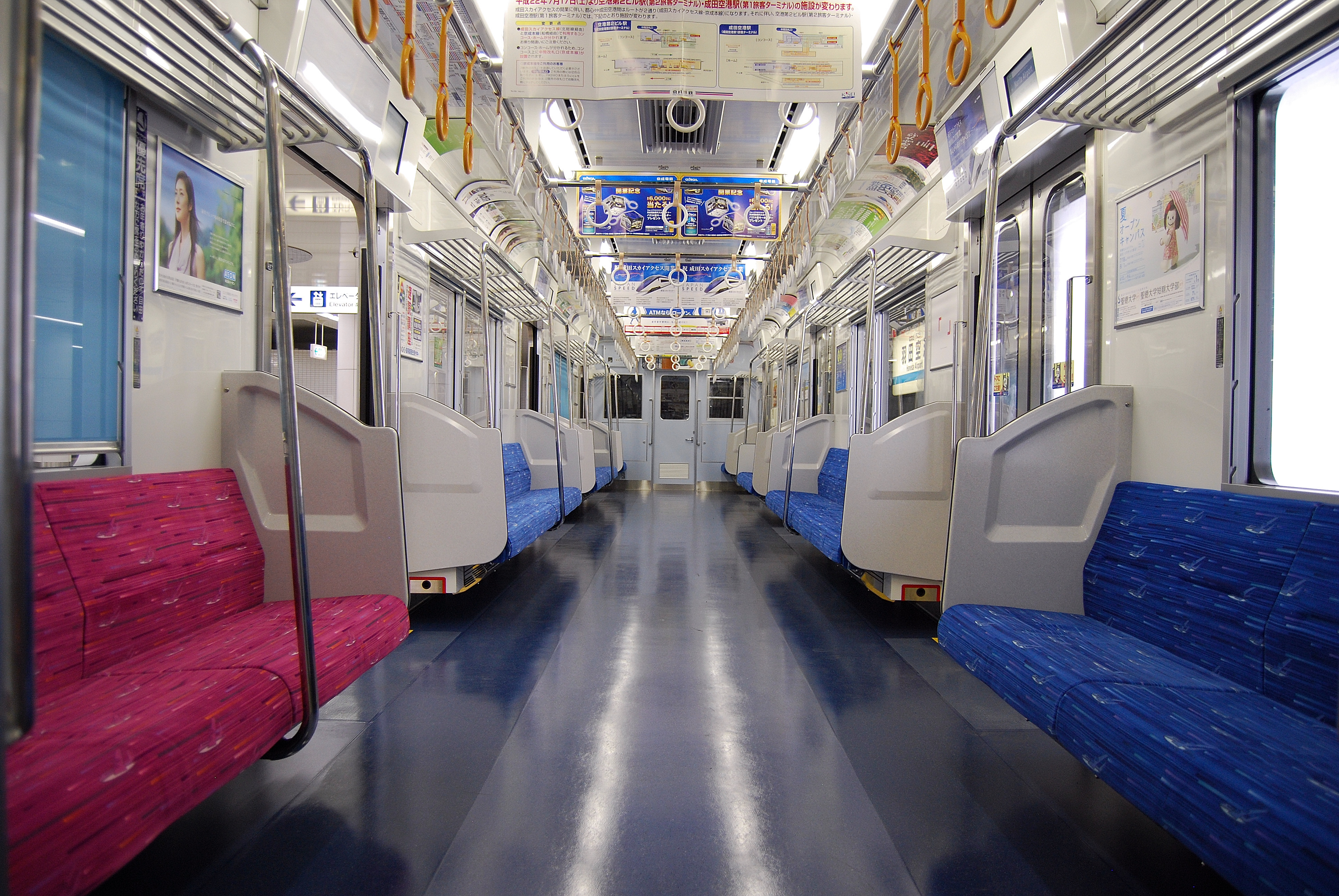
Interior view (3050 series)

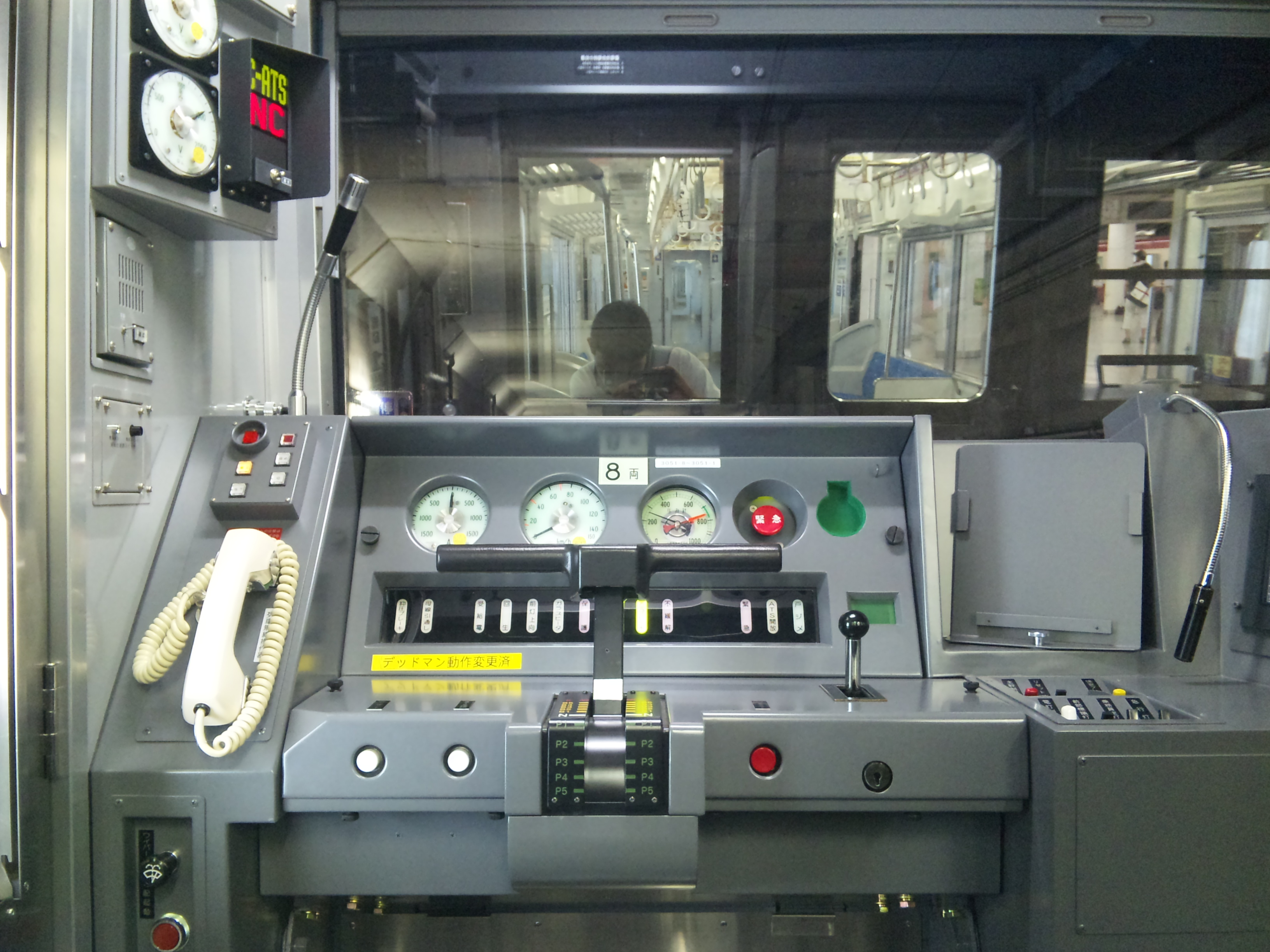
Driver's cab

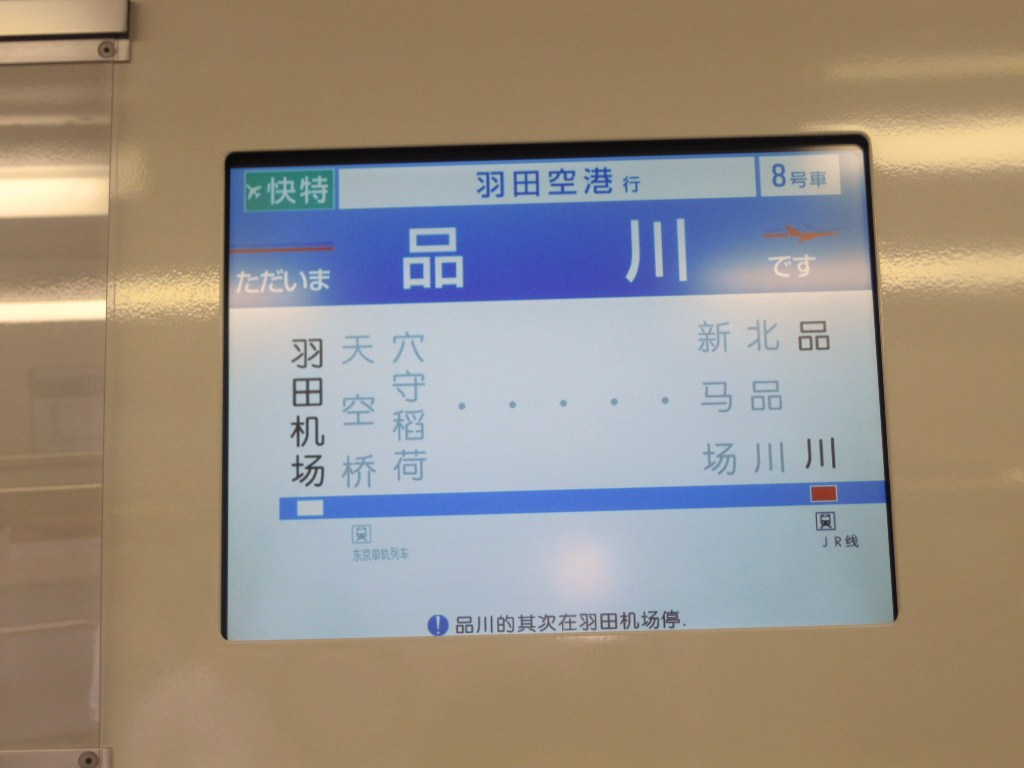
Multilingual LCD passenger information display, showing information in Chinese

== History ==
The first two sets, 8-car set 3001 and 6-car set 3002, were delivered to Keisei in December 2002. The fleet entered revenue service on 1 February 2003.

A second 3000 series eight-car set, 3026, was delivered from the Nippon Sharyo factory in Toyokawa, Aichi in January 2013, approximately five years after the previous set was built.

== Fleet build details ==
The build histories for the most recent 3000 series sets are as shown below. Two six-car sets, 3031 and 3032, were delivered during fiscal 2015, entering revenue service in February and March 2016 respectively. These trains feature interior LED lighting.

Set No.	Manufacturer	Date delivered
3051	Nippon Sharyo	18 January 2010
3052	Nippon Sharyo	5 March 2010
3053	Nippon Sharyo	16 March 2010
3054	Nippon Sharyo	15 June 2010
3055	Nippon Sharyo	17 June 2010
3056	Nippon Sharyo	29 June 2010
3026	Nippon Sharyo	4 February 2013
3027	J-TREC, Yokohama	4 March 2013
3028	Nippon Sharyo	24 February 2014
3029	J-TREC, Yokohama	16 March 2015
3030	Nippon Sharyo	3 February 2015
3031	Nippon Sharyo	9 February 2016
3032	J-TREC, Yokohama	29 February 2016
3033	J-TREC, Yokohama	February 2017
3034	Nippon Sharyo	February 2017
3035	Nippon Sharyo	February 2017
3036	Nippon Sharyo	January 2018
3037	Nippon Sharyo	February 2018
3038	Nippon Sharyo	February 2018
3039	Nippon Sharyo	August 2018
3040	Nippon Sharyo	September 2018
3041	Nippon Sharyo	February 2019
3042	Nippon Sharyo	February 2019

== Livery variations ==
Sets 3051 to 3056 were delivered with a blue airport-access livery.

In 2019, the livery of set 3052 was changed to match that of the then-new Keisei 3100 series trains, with four other 3050 subseries sets scheduled to be re-liveried the same way in the future. Set 3056 remains the last set to obtain the orange scheme.

Starting from December 2019, 3050 subseries trains were re-liveried to match that of the 3000 series fleet, with set 3051 being the first to receive the mainline livery.

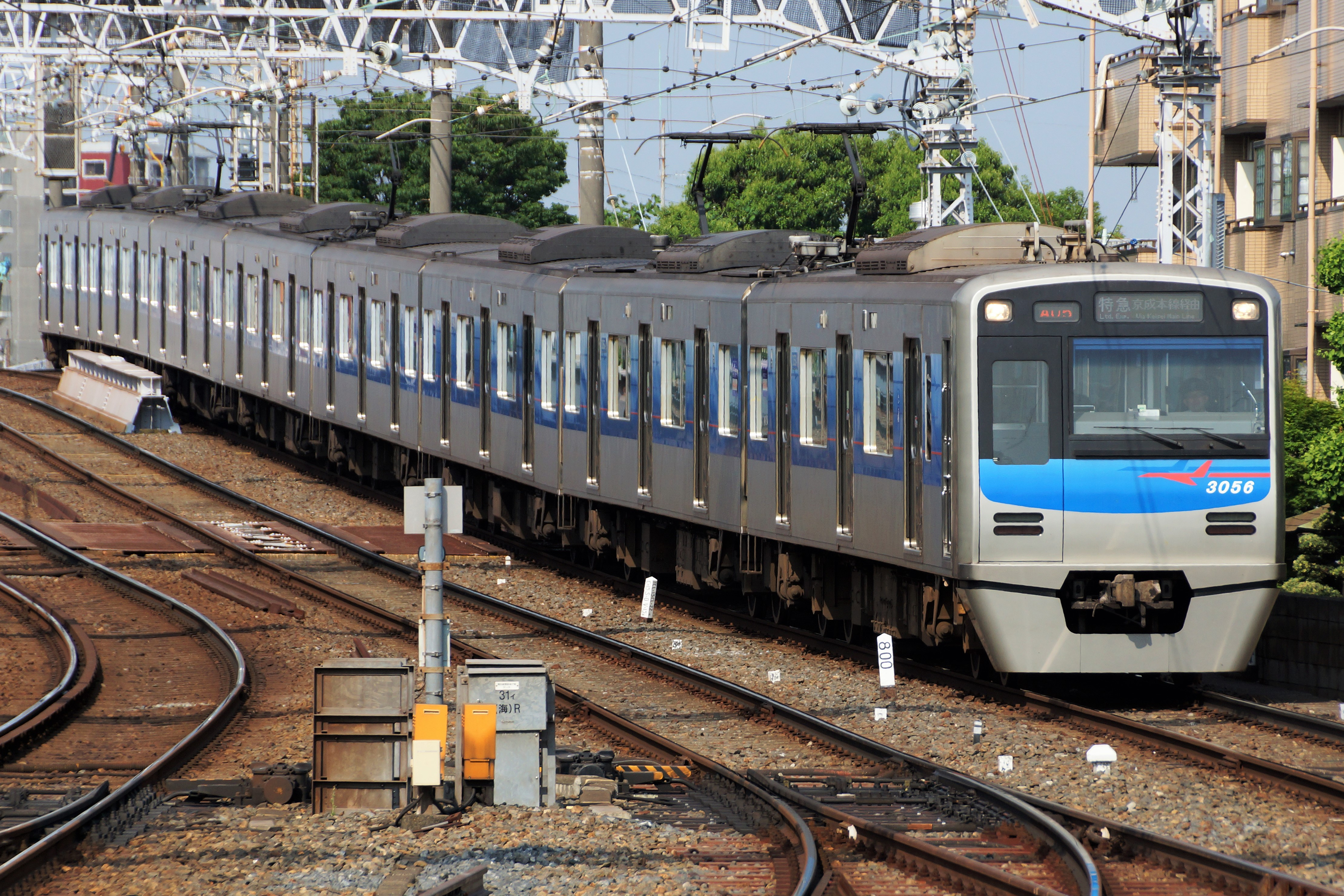
Set 3056 with the blue airport scheme, May 2017

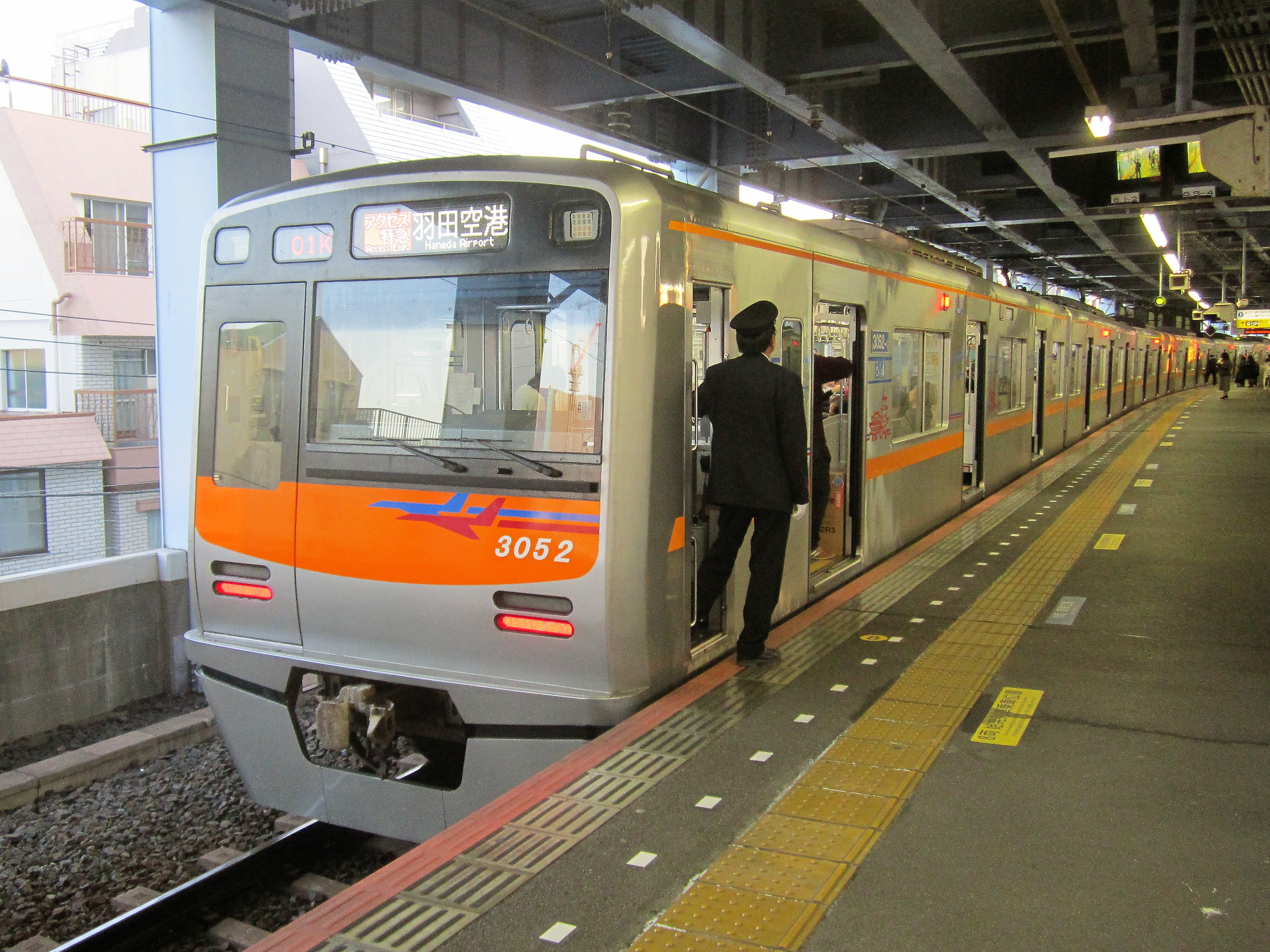
Set 3052 at Aoto Station with the updated orange scheme, November 2019

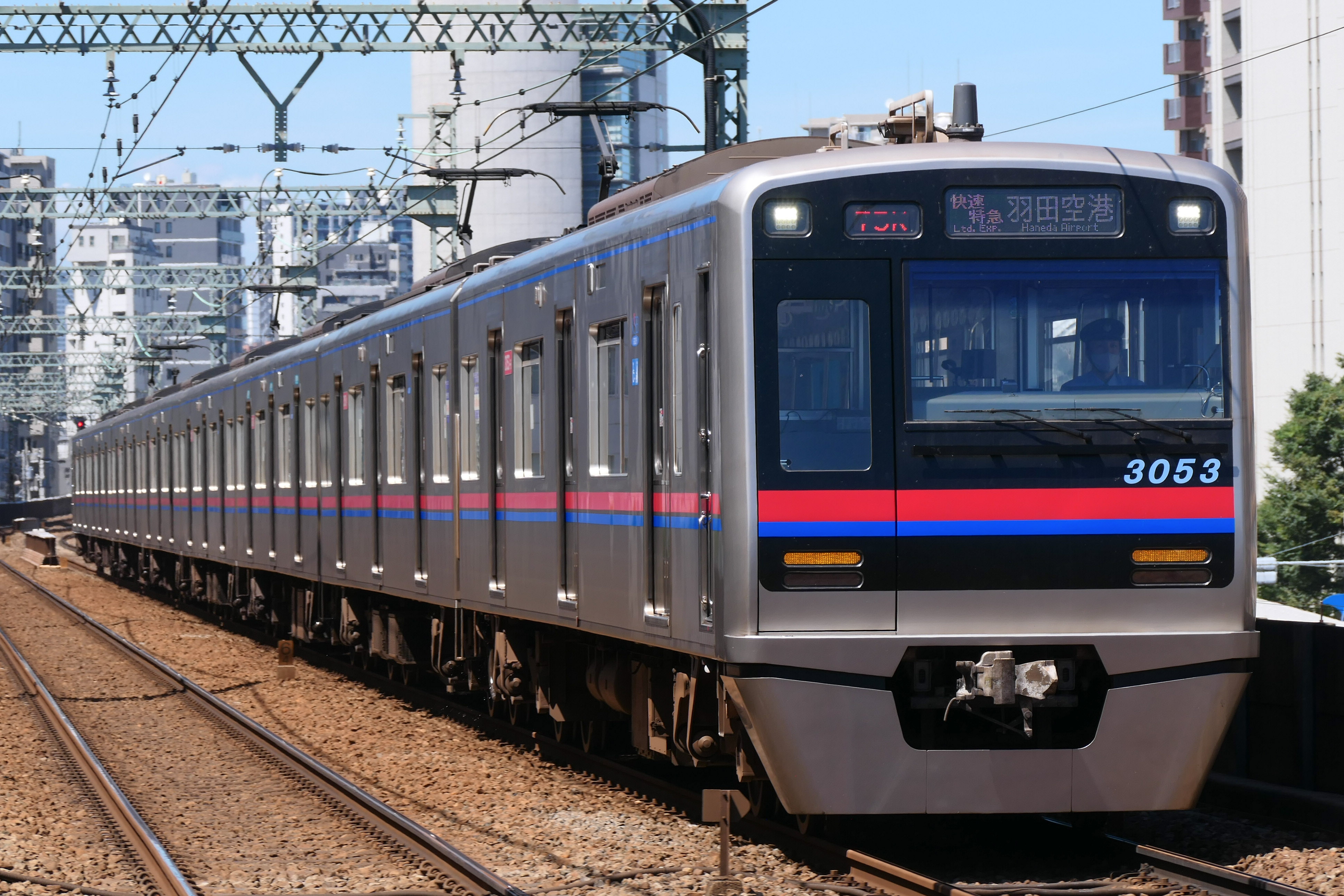
Set 3053 with the standard 3000 series livery, July 2021

== See also ==
- Shin-Keisei N800 series, a derivative for use on the Keisei Matsudo Line since 2005
- Hokuso 7500 series, a derivative for use on the Hokuso Line since 2006
- Chiba New Town Railway 9200 series, a derivative for use on the Hokuso Line since 2013
