= Chiba New Town Railway 9200 series =

Class of 1 Japanese 8-car electric multiple unit

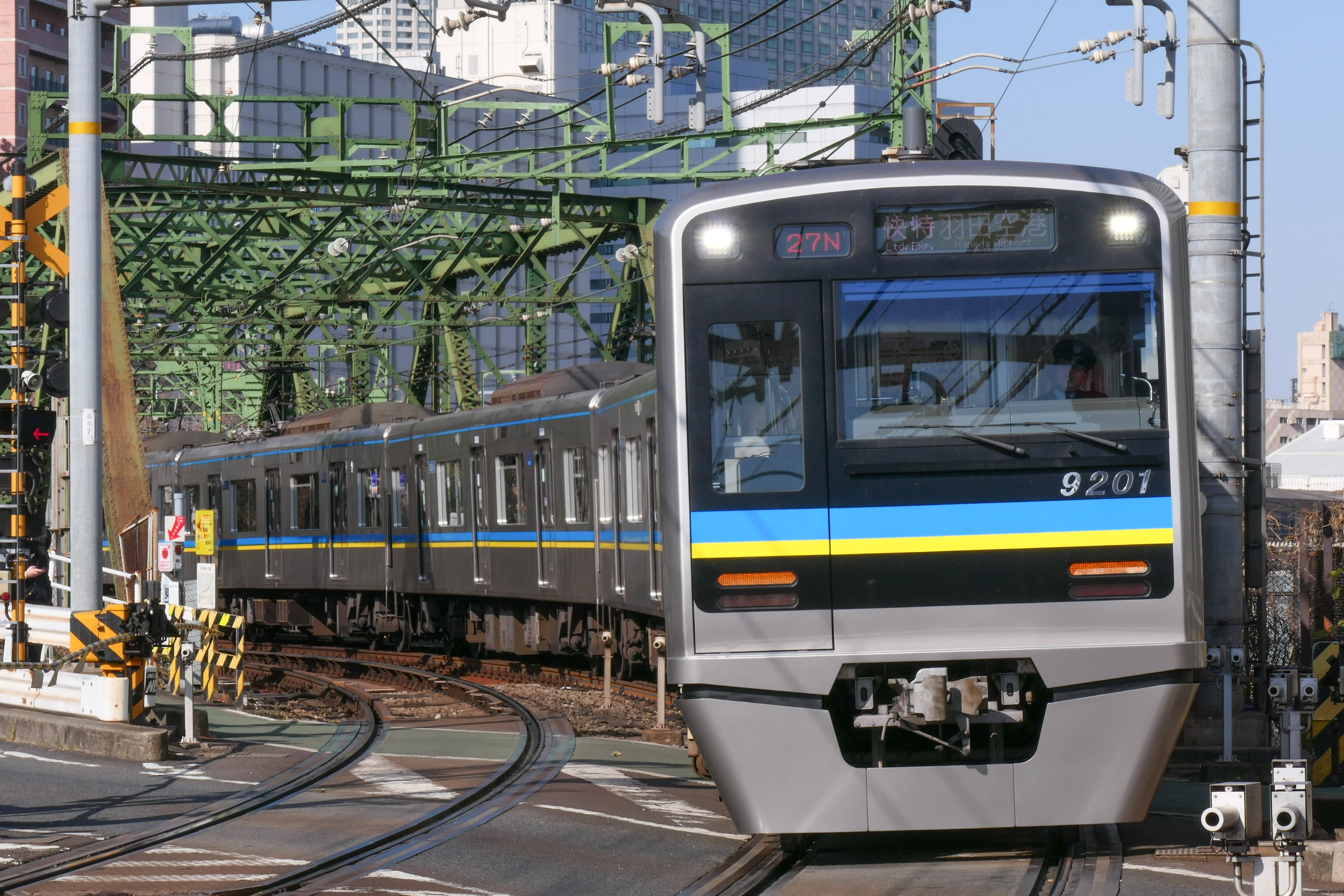
- Set 9201 in service in January 2021
- Manufacturer: Nippon Sharyo
- Built at: Toyokawa
- Replaced: Chiba New Town Railway 9000 series
- Constructed: 2013–
- Entered service: 1 March 2013
- Number built: 8 vehicles (1 set)
- Number in service: 8 vehicles (1 set)
- Formation: 8 cars per trainset
- Fleet numbers: 9201
- Owner: Chiba New Town Railway
- Operator: Hokuso Railway
- Depot: Inba
- Lines served: Hokuso Line; Keisei Main Line; Keisei Oshiage Line; Toei Asakusa Line; Keikyu Main Line; Keikyu Airport Line

Specifications
- Car body construction: Stainless steel
- Car length: 18,000 mm (59 ft 1 in)
- Width: 2,845 mm (9 ft 4.0 in)
- Doors: 3 pairs per side
- Maximum speed: 120 km/h (75 mph)
- Acceleration: 3.5 km/(h⋅s) (2.2 mph/s)
- Deceleration: 4.0 km/(h⋅s) (2.5 mph/s) (service); 4.5 km/(h⋅s) (2.8 mph/s) (emergency)
- Electric system: 1,500 V DC overhead catenary
- Current collection: Pantograph
- Bogies: FS-564 (motored), FS-064 (trailer)
- Safety system: C-ATS
- Track gauge: 1,435 mm (4 ft 8 1/2 in)

The Chiba New Town Railway 9200 series (千葉ニュータウン鉄道9200形) is a commuter electric multiple unit (EMU) train type owned by the third-sector railway company Chiba New Town Railway and operated by the Hokuso Railway on the Hokuso Line in Japan since 1 March 2013.

== Design ==
The design is based on the Keisei 3050 series, and is similar to the Hokuso 7500 series and Shin-Keisei N800 series trains also based on the same design.

== Formation ==
The eight-car set is formed as shown below, with six motored (M) cars and two trailer (T) cars.

| Designation | M2c | M1 | T | M2 | M1' | T | M1 | M2c |
| Numbering | 9201-1 | 9201-2 | 9201-3 | 9201-4 | 9201-5 | 9201-6 | 9201-7 | 9201-8 |
| Weight (t) | 33.0 | 33.0 | 27.0 | 30.0 | 32.0 | 27.0 | 33.0 | 33.0 |
| Capacity (Total/seated) | 122/43 | 133/52 | 133/52 | 133/52 | 133/52 | 133/52 | 133/52 | 122/43 |

The "M1" cars each have two PT7131-B single-arm pantographs, and the "M" car has one.

== Interior ==
The interior design is virtually identical to the Hokuso 7500 series, with passenger accommodation consisting of longitudinal bench seating throughout, although whereas the Hokuso 7500 series has three LED scrolling passenger information display units per car, the 9200 series has six 15-inch LCD screens per car, like the Keisei 3050 series, located above each doorway.

== History ==
The sole set, 9201, was delivered to the Hokuso Line depot at Inba from the Nippon Sharyo factory in Toyokawa, Aichi in February 2013. It entered revenue service from 1 March 2013.
