= 7800 series =

7800 series may refer to:

== Technology ==
- GeForce 7800 series, a line of graphics processing units from Nvidia
- Radeon HD 7800 series, a line of graphics processing units from AMD

== Transportation ==
- Chichibu Railway 7800 series electric multiple unit
- Hokuso 7800 series, a sub-variant of the Hokuso 7300 series electric multiple unit
- Tobu 7800 series electric multiple unit
