= Hokuso 7500 series =

Japanese electric multiple unit train type

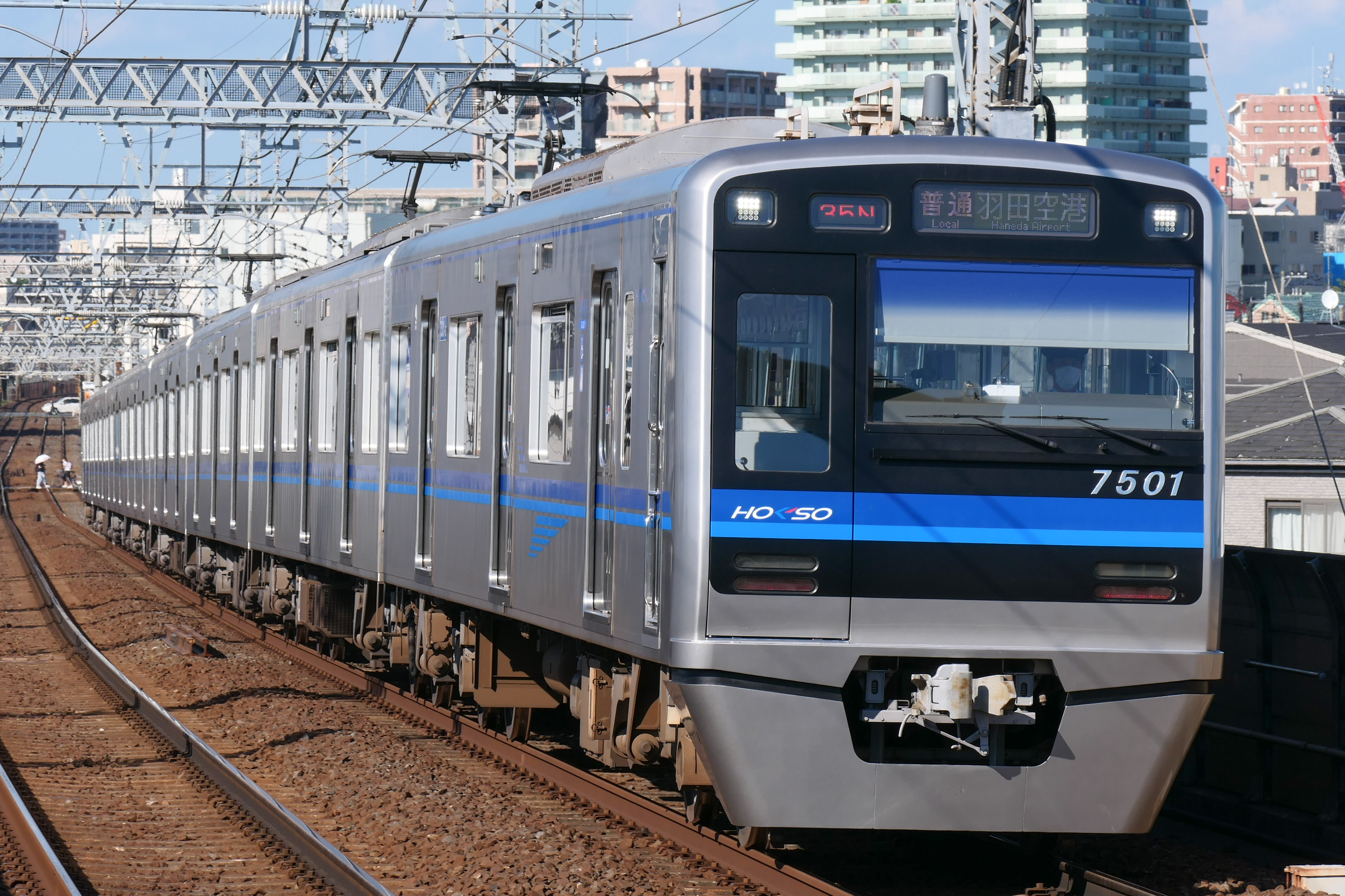
- Set 7501 in July 2021
- Manufacturers: Nippon Sharyo, Tokyu Car
- Constructed: 2006
- Entered service: 2006
- Number built: 24 vehicles (3 sets)
- Number in service: 24 vehicles (3 sets)
- Formation: 8 cars per trainset
- Fleet numbers: 7501–7503
- Lines served: Hokuso Line; Keisei Main Line; Keisei Oshiage Line; Toei Asakusa Line; Keikyu Main Line; Keikyu Airport Line

Specifications
- Car body construction: Stainless steel
- Car length: 18,000 mm (59 ft 1 in)
- Width: 2,768 mm (9 ft 1.0 in)
- Height: 4,050 mm (13 ft 3 in)
- Doors: 3 pairs per side
- Maximum speed: 120 km/h (75 mph)
- Acceleration: 3.5 km/(h⋅s) (2.2 mph/s)
- Power supply: 1,500 V
- Current collection: Overhead catenary
- Safety system: C-ATS
- Track gauge: 1,435 mm (4 ft 8 1/2 in)

The Hokuso 7500 series (北総鉄道7500形) is an electric multiple unit (EMU) commuter train type operated by the Hokuso Railway on the Hokuso Line in Japan since 2006.

== Design ==
The design is based on the Keisei 3000 series.

== Formation ==
As of 1 April 2017, the fleet consists of three eight-car sets formed as shown below, with six motored (M) cars and two trailer (T) cars.

Designation	M2c	M1	T	M2	M1'	T	M1	M2c
Numbering	7501-1	7501-2	7501-3	7501-4	7501-5	7501-6	7501-7	7501-8

The two M1 cars each have two single-arm pantographs, and the M1' car has one.

== See also ==
- Chiba New Town Railway 9200 series, a similar design owned by the Chiba New Town Railway
- Shin-Keisei N800 series, a similar design owned by Shin-Keisei
