= NGC 7800 =

Galaxy in the constellation Pegasus

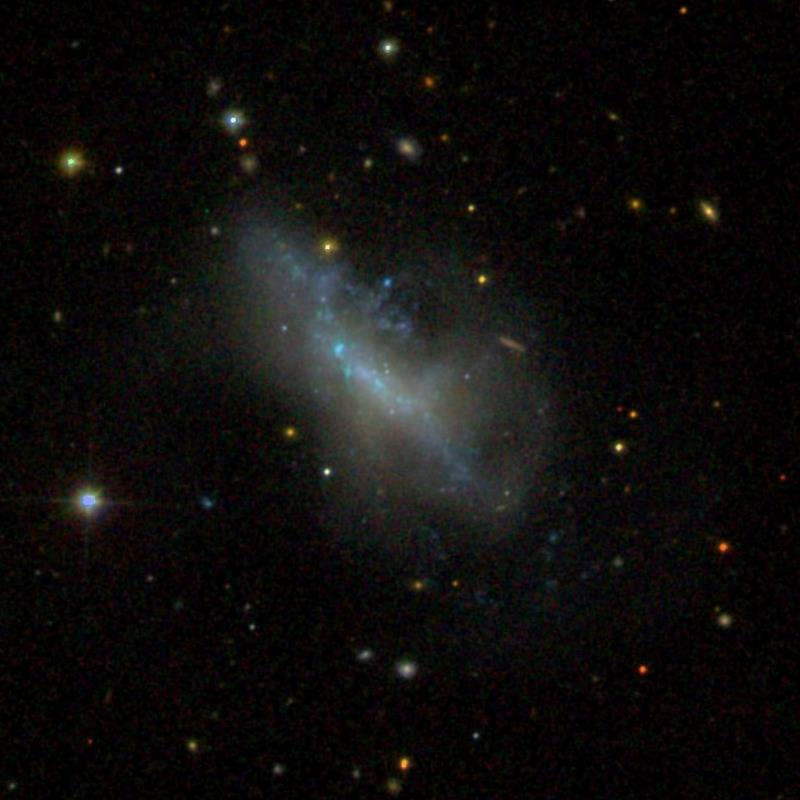
- A Sloan Digital Sky Survey (SDSS) image of NGC 7800

Observation data (J2000 epoch)
- Constellation: Pegasus
- Right ascension: 23^{h} 59^{m} 37.10^{s}
- Declination: +14° 48′ 26.0″
- Redshift: 0.0058 ± 0.00016
- Distance: 70 Mly (21.48 Mpc)
- Apparent magnitude (V): 12.6

Characteristics
- Type: Im
- Size: 51,000 ly
- Apparent size (V): 1.862' x 0.912'
- Notable features: Used to be a spiral(?)

Other designations
- KUG 2357+145, IRAS 23570+1431, 2MASX J23593630+1448200, UGC 12885, MCG +02-01-007, PGC 73177

NGC 7800 is an irregular galaxy located around 70 million light-years away in the constellation Pegasus. It was discovered on the 24th of December in 1783 by William Herschel. NGC 7800 is not known to have an active galactic nucleus, and is not known to have much star-forming regions.
