= Tokyu 8090 series =

Japanese train type

Tokyu 8090 and 8590 series
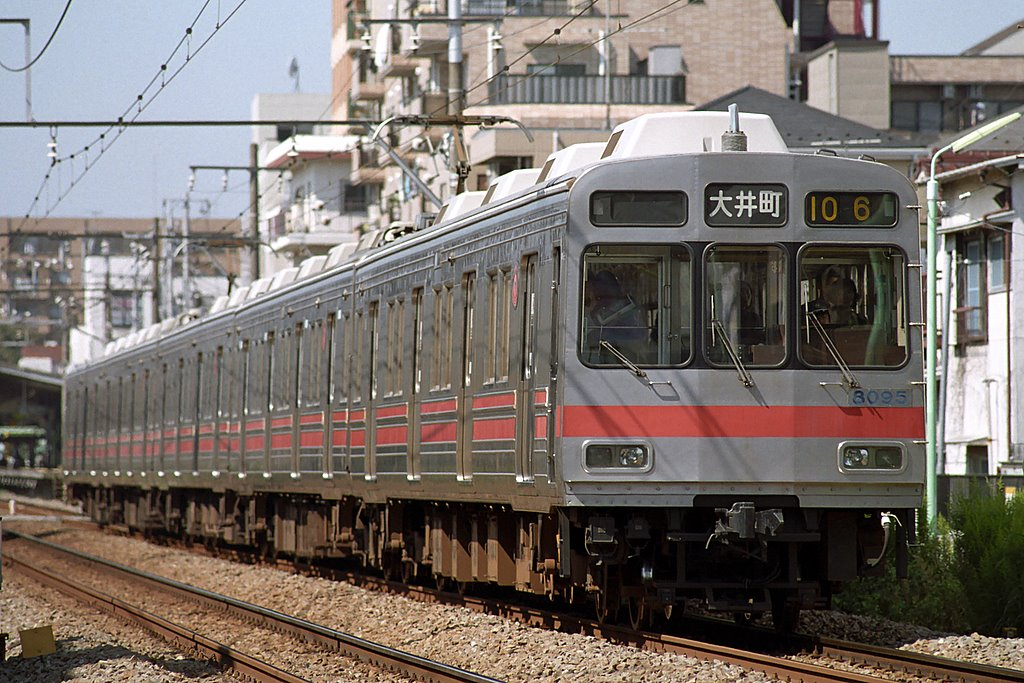
- 8090 series on the Oimachi Line
- In service: 1980–2019
- Manufacturer: Tokyu Car
- Constructed: 1980–1985 (8090 series); 1988–1989 (8590 series)
- Entered service: 1980 (8090 series); 1988 (8590 series)
- Number built: 90 vehicles
- Number in service: None
- Formation: 5/8/10 cars per trainset
- Operator: Tokyu Corporation
- Lines served: Tokyu Den-en-toshi Line; Tokyo Metro Hanzomon Line; Tokyu Oimachi Line; Tokyu Toyoko Line

Specifications
- Car body construction: Stainless steel
- Car length: 20 m (65 ft 7 in)
- Doors: 4 pairs per side
- Maximum speed: 120 km/h (75 mph)
- Traction system: Field Chopper Control
- Power output: 130 kW (174 hp) per motor
- Electric system: 1,500 V DC overhead lines
- Current collection: Pantograph
- Track gauge: 1,067 mm (3 ft 6 in)

The Tokyu 8090 series (東急8090系, Tōkyū 8090-kei) and the related Tokyu 8590 series (東急8590系, Tōkyū 8590-kei) were commuter electric multiple unit (EMU) train types that were operated by the private railway operator Tokyu Corporation in the Kanto region of Japan from 1980 until 2019.

== Design ==
The trains have lightweight stainless steel car bodies. The car bodies were designed using computer analysis while maintaining the necessary strength. Compared to the preceding 8000 series trains, these trains weigh approximately 2 tons lighter per car. Tokyu operated the 8090 series as five- and eight-car sets, with three and six motored cars per trainset. The 8590 series cab cars have emergency exit doors in the front to permit operation on underground lines.

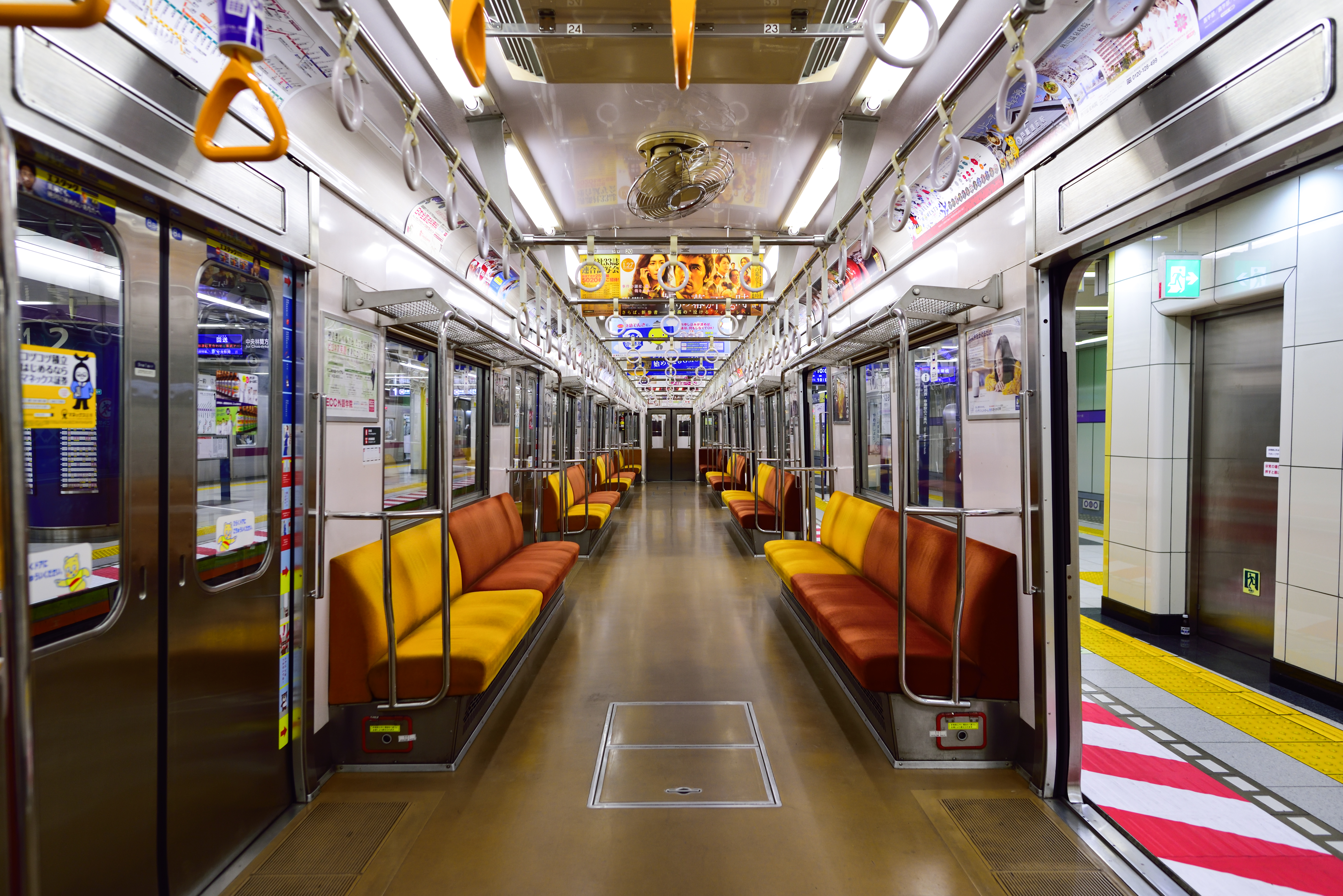
8090 series interior

== History ==
The 8090 series were introduced on the Tokyu Toyoko Line in 1980.

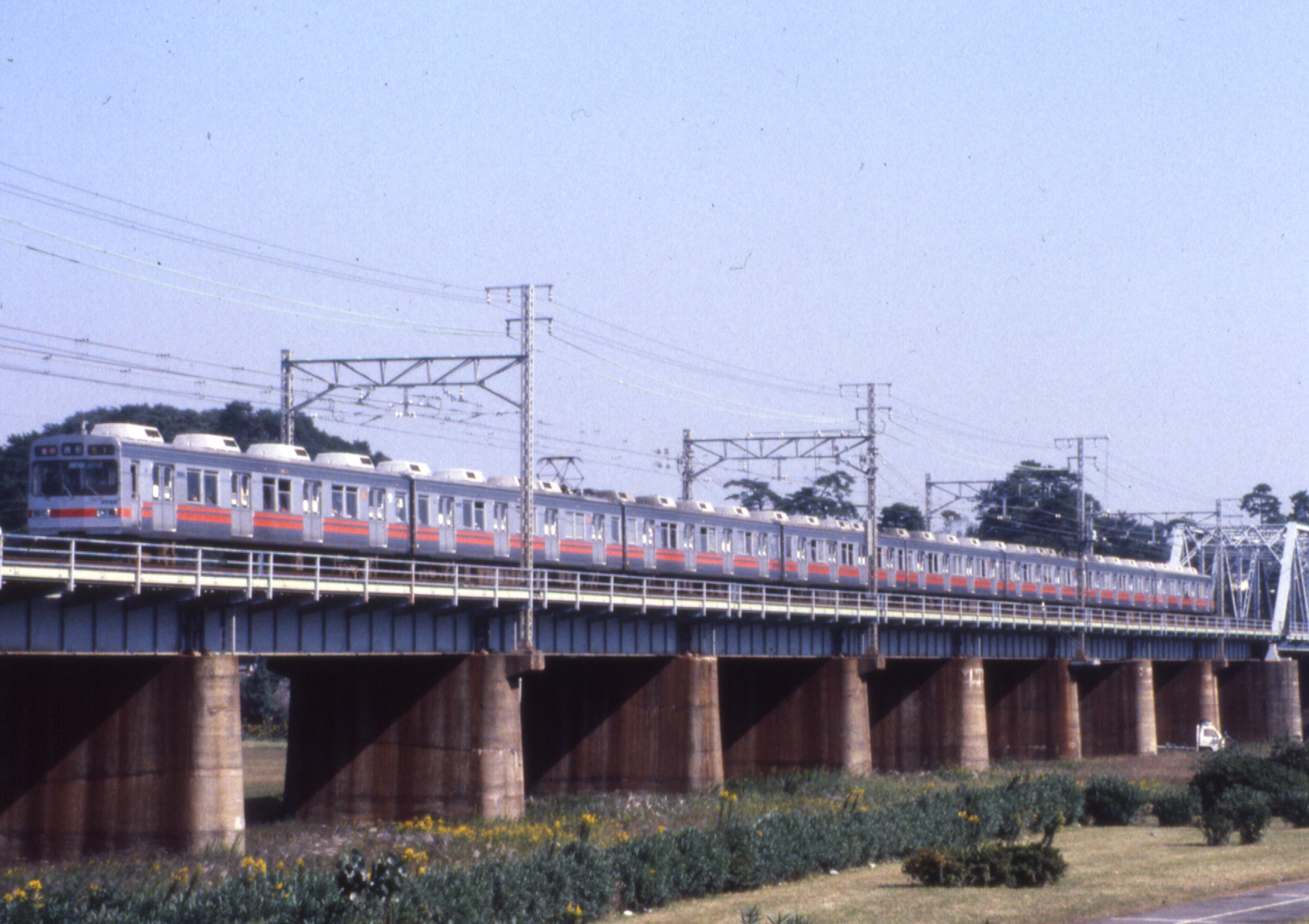
8090 series on the Toyoko line in August 1988

In preparation for future inter-running services between the Toyoko Line and the then-finalised Minatomirai Line, reorganisation of this series took place from September 1988 to February 1989. This was done by manufacturing 10 new 8590 series cab cars with emergency exit doors and removing three cars from each of the ten 8090 series sets and combining two sets of the extracted cars with two of the newly built 8590 series end cars, thus forming 5 8590 series 8-car sets. In addition, the original 8090 series sets became 5-car sets and were transferred to the Tokyu Oimachi Line.

In 2006, sets 8694 and 8695 were lengthened to 10 cars and transferred to the Tokyu Den-en-toshi Line while sets 8691-8693 were re-deployed to the Oimachi Line as five-car sets.

The 10-car sets were used on Tokyu Den-en-toshi Line and Tokyo Metro Hanzomon Line inter-running services, but they were not capable of running through to the Tobu Skytree Line. Hence, they had "K" stickers attached on the front cab window to indicate this.

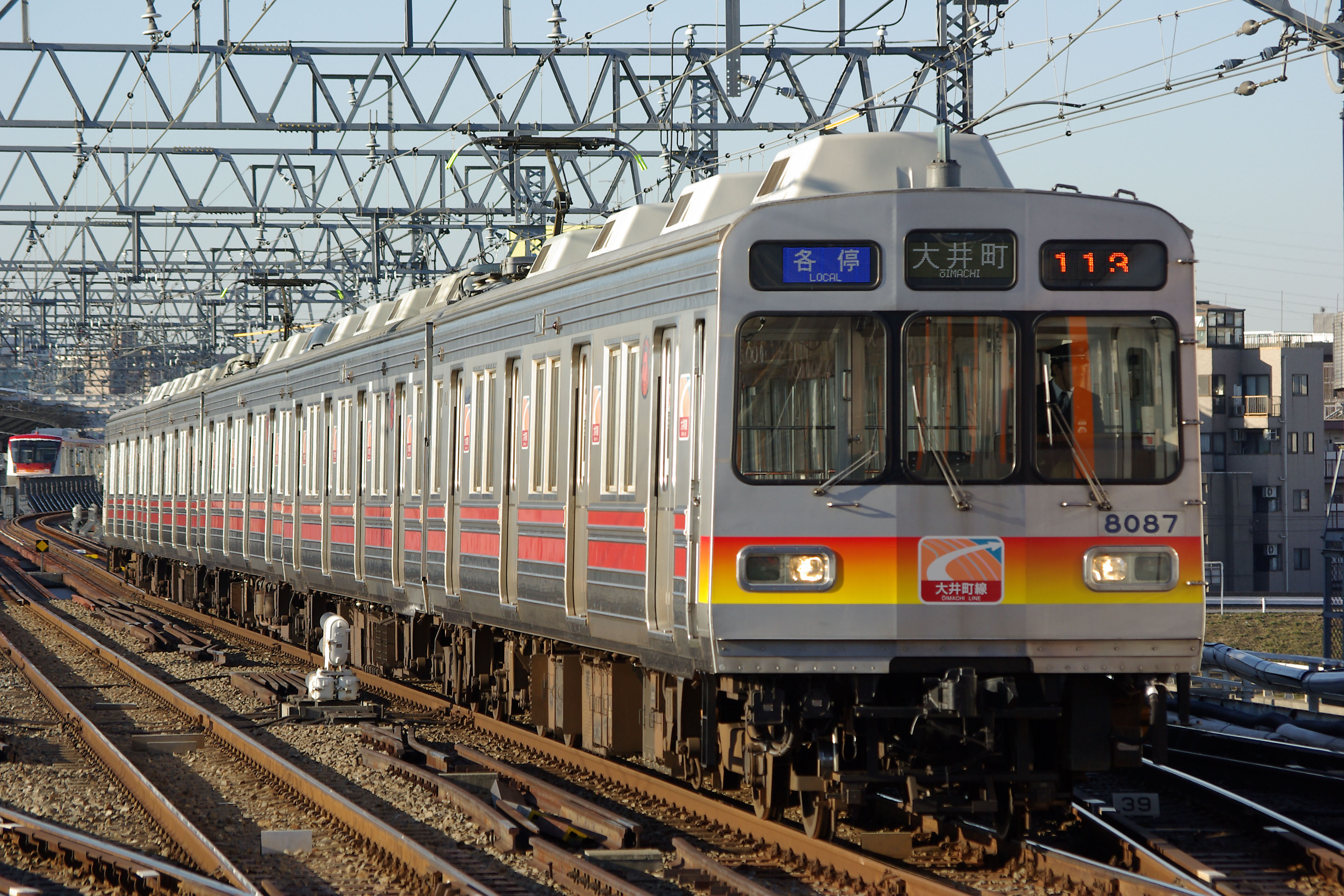
8090 series set 8087 on the Oimachi Line

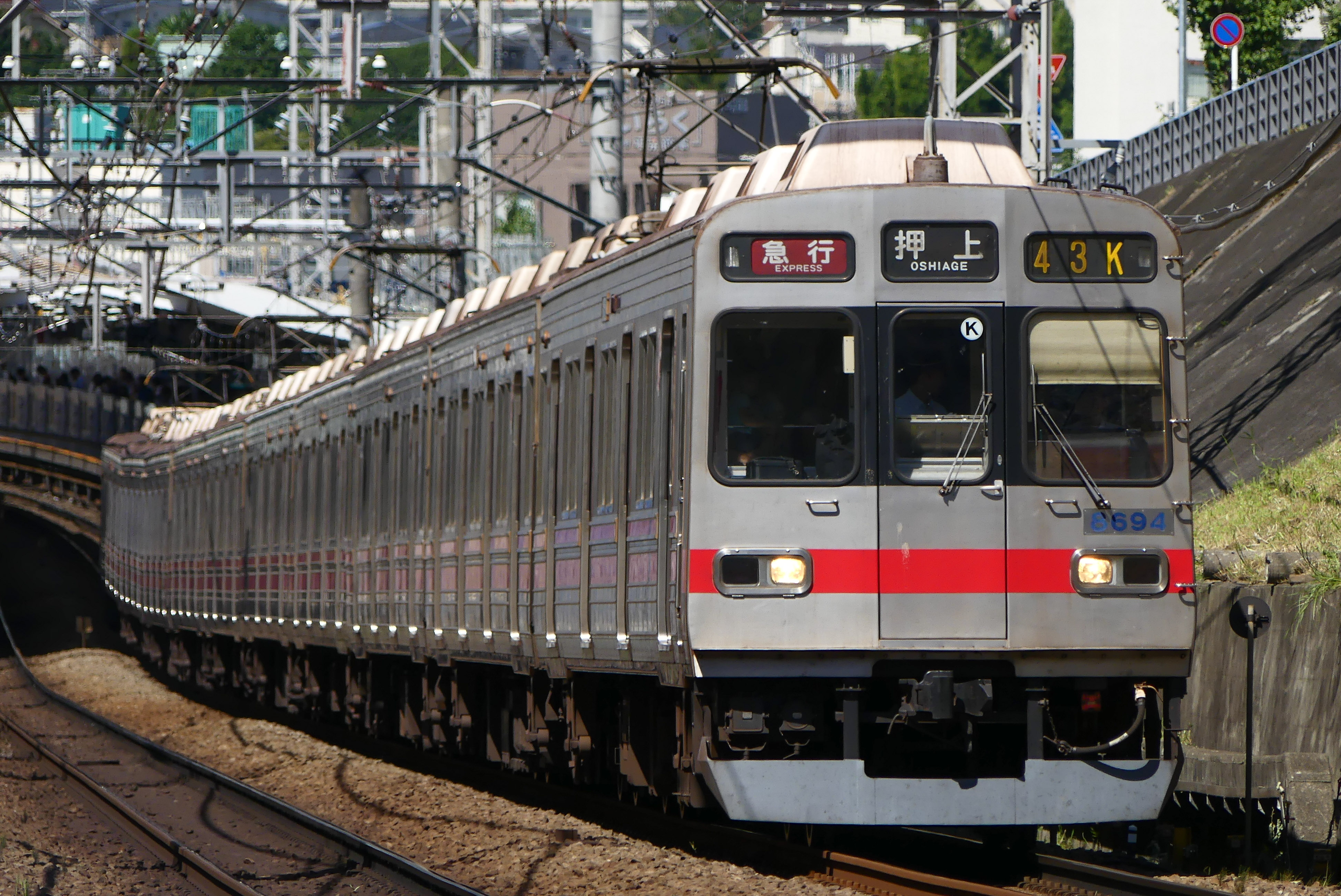
8590 series set 8694 on the Den-en-toshi Line

== Withdrawal ==
From 1 May 2013, sets 8081 and 8099, which were the last two 8090 series sets on the Oimachi Line received farewell headmarks on the cab fronts just before their retirement.

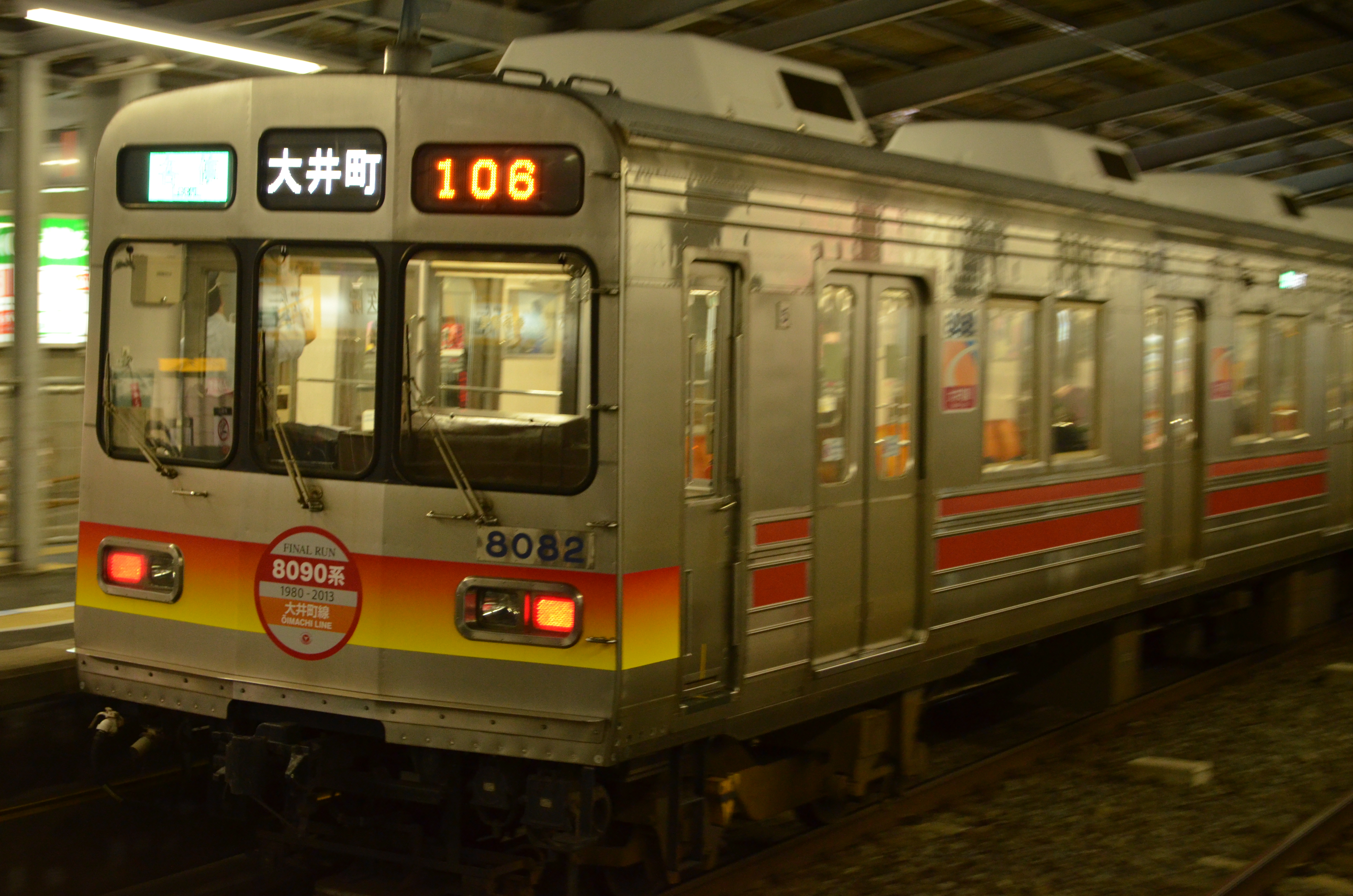
8090 series set 8081 with farewell headmark in May 2013

On 11 December 2018, 10-car set 8695 was withdrawn from service on the Den-en-toshi Line. On 27 February 2019, set 8694, which was the last remaining 8590 series set, ended service on the Den-en-toshi Line and was later sent to Onda factory.

== Resale ==
=== Chichibu Railway ===
Former Tokyu 8090 series cars were transferred to Chichibu Railway, which designated them as 7500 and 7800 series.

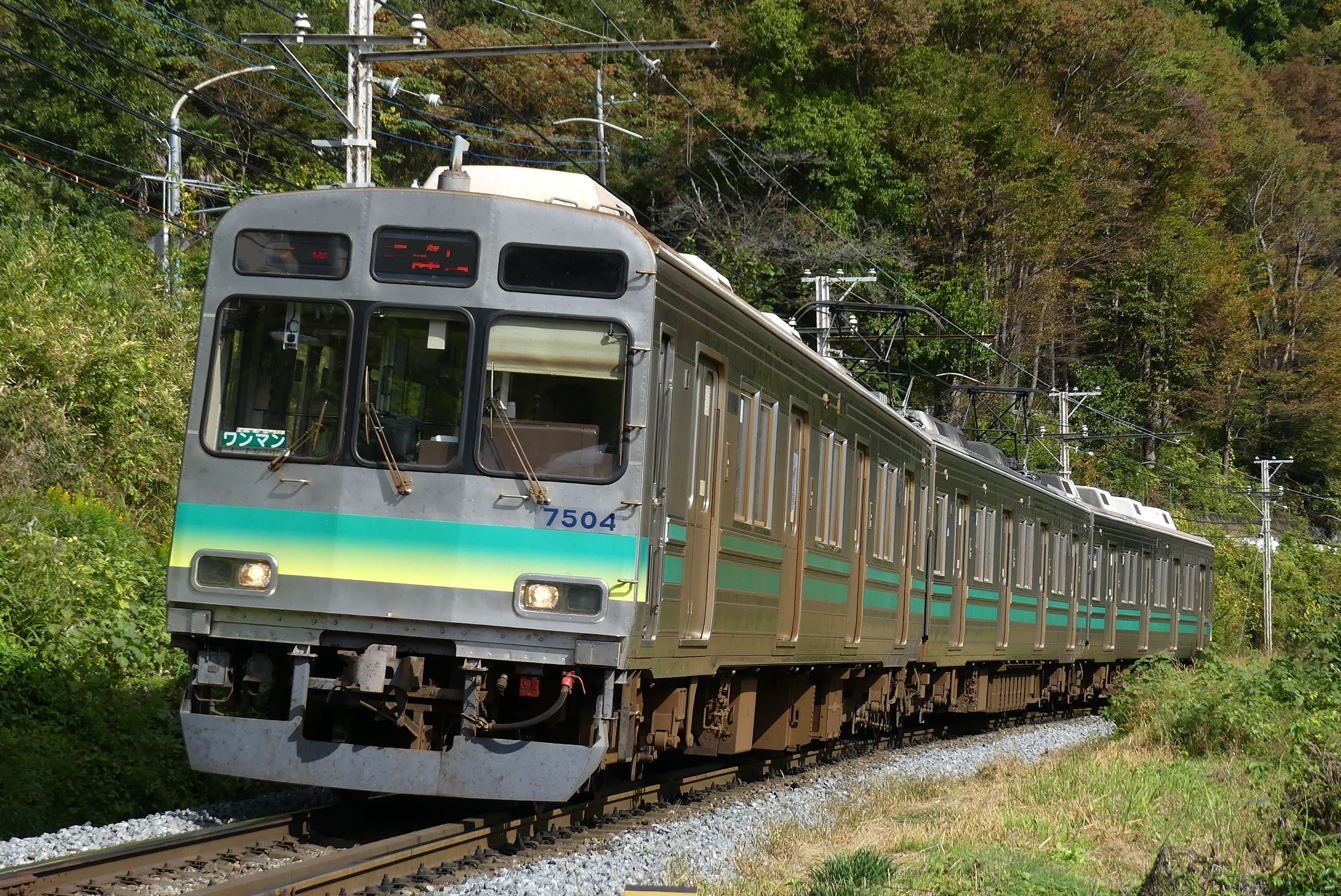
7500 series

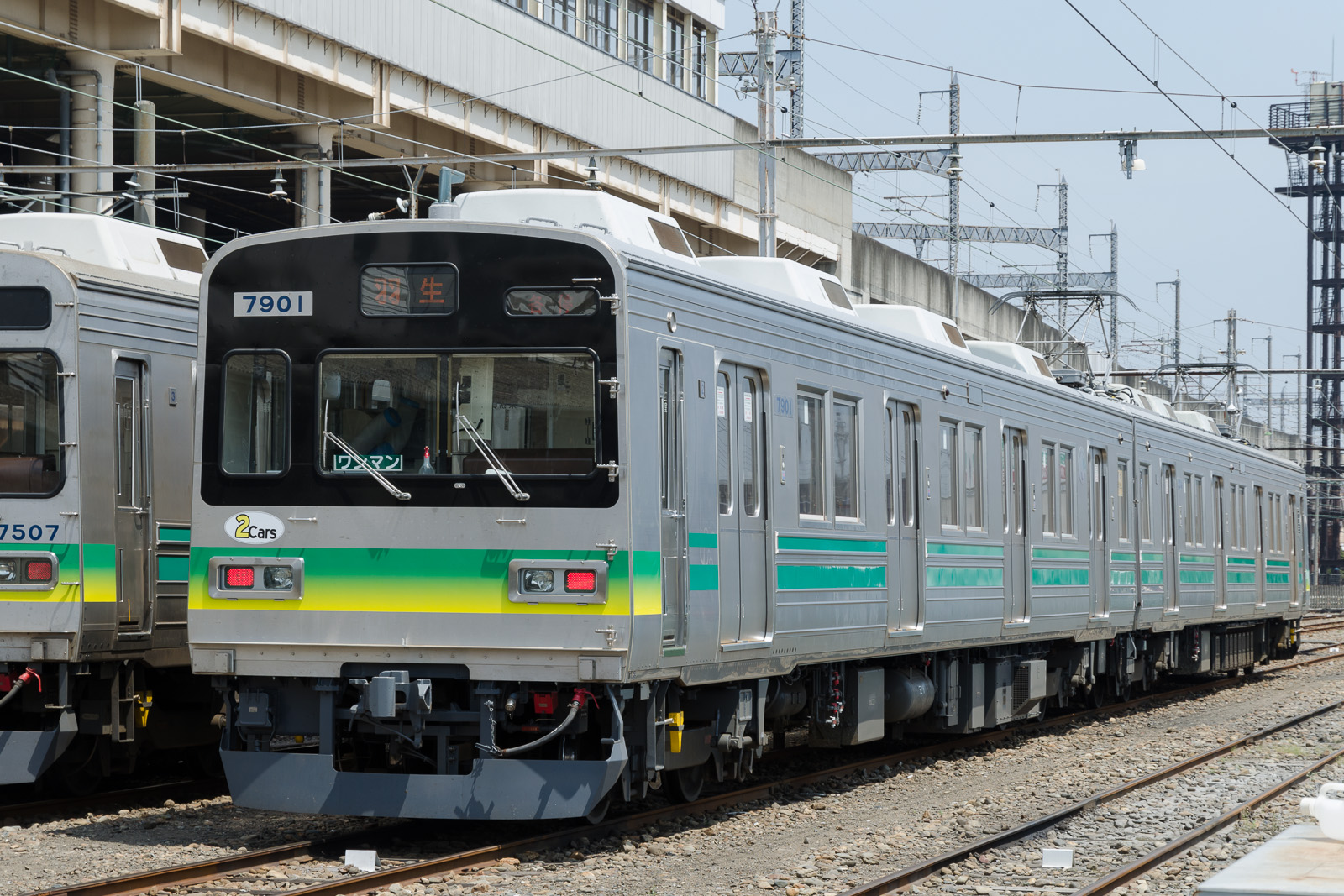
7800 series

=== Toyama Chihō Railway ===
Toyama Chihō Railway operates a number of former Tokyu 8590 series trains, classified as 17480 series (17480形). They first entered service on 2 November 2013 and were put into regular operation from 3 November that same year. The first 5 cars (8592, 8692, 8593, 8693 and 8191) were transferred to Toyama Chihō Railway in July 2013. Four more cars (8594, 8694, 8595 and 8695) followed suit in October 2019.

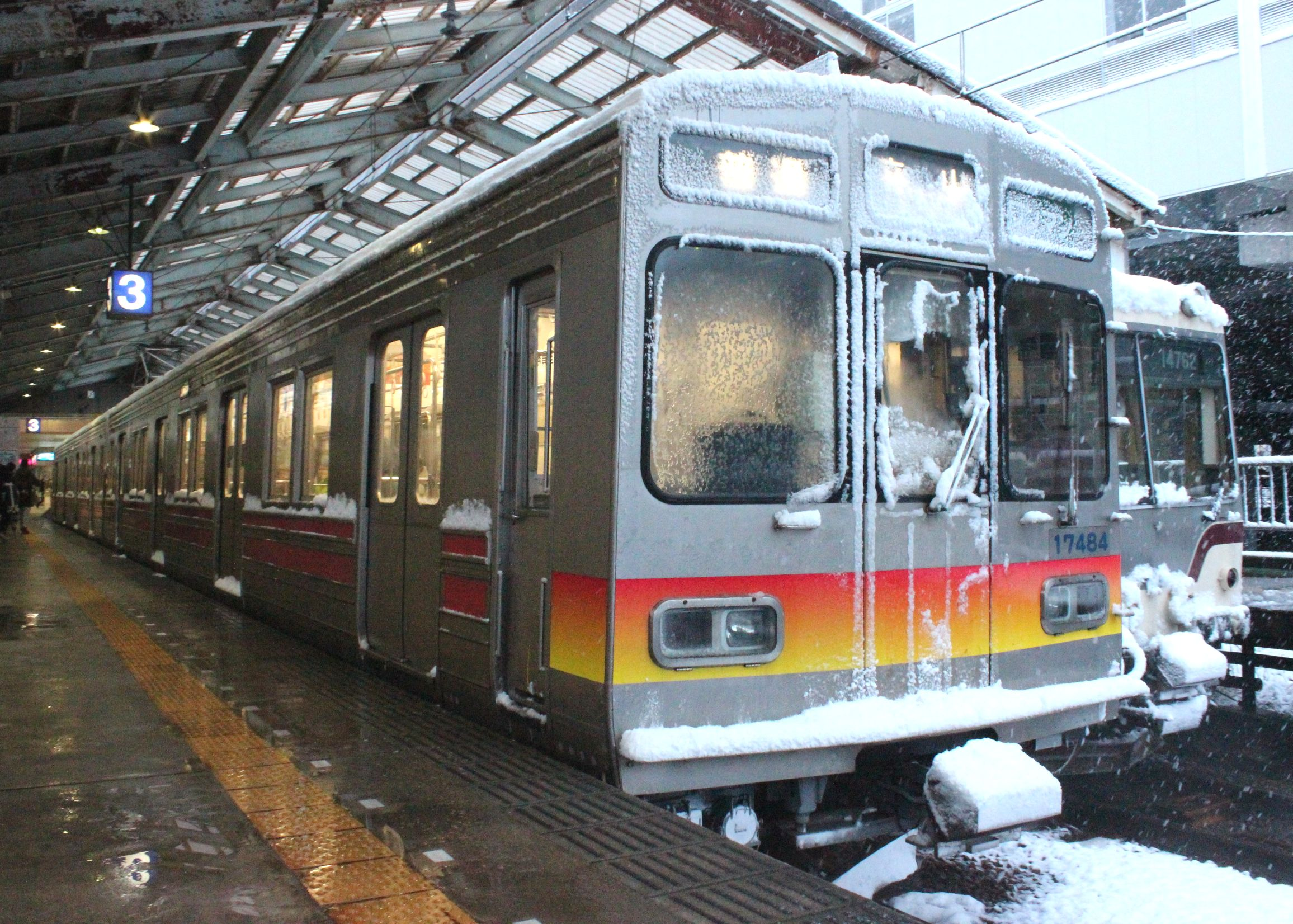
17480 series
