= Chichibu Railway 1000 series =

Japanese train type

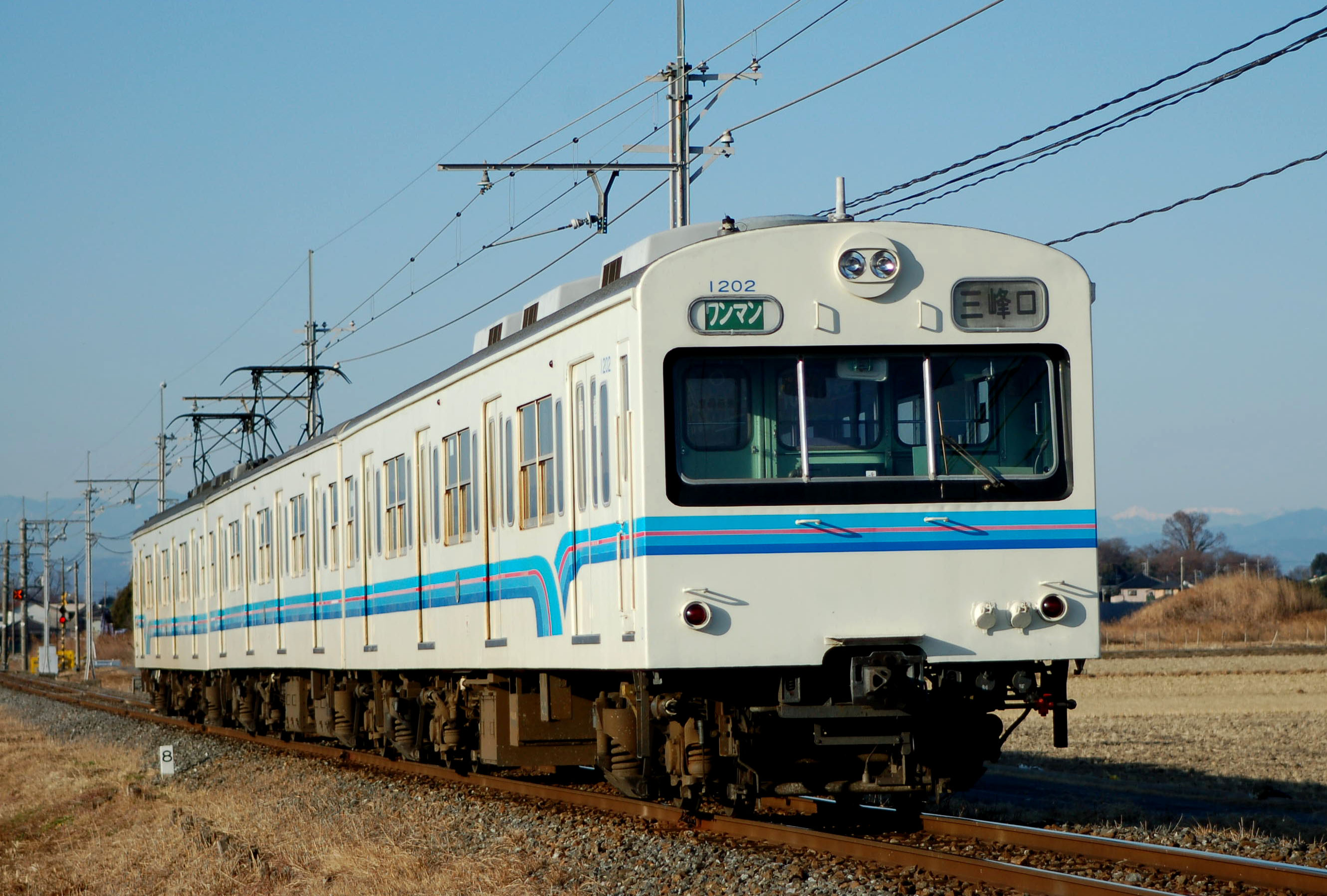
- 1000 series set 1002 in the second livery in January 2008
- In service: 1986–2014
- Manufacturers: Kawasaki Heavy Industries, Kinki Sharyo, Nippon Sharyo, Tokyu Car Corporation
- Constructed: 1959–1968
- Refurbished: 1986–1989
- Scrapped: 2009–2014
- Number built: 36 vehicles (12 sets)
- Number in service: None
- Number scrapped: 36 vehicles (12 sets)
- Formation: 3 cars per trainset
- Operator: Chichibu Railway
- Depot: Kumagaya
- Line served: Chichibu Main Line

Specifications
- Car body construction: Steel
- Car length: 20 m (65 ft 7 in)
- Doors: 4 pairs per side
- Electric system: 1,500 V DC
- Current collection: Overhead wire
- Track gauge: 1,067 mm (3 ft 6 in)

The Chichibu Railway 1000 series (秩父鉄道1000系) was an electric multiple unit (EMU) train type for local services operated by Chichibu Railway in Japan from 1986 until March 2014.

== History ==
Twelve three-car trains were converted in 1986 from former JNR 101 series commuter EMUs. Conversion included the addition of a second pantograph on the DeHa 1000 cars and the inclusion of a luggage area at the cab ends separated by a curtain arrangement.

Air-conditioning was added to the end cars from fiscal 1994, with the centre cars in each set left without air-conditioning.

The trains were modified for wanman driver only operation from December 1999. The final train ran on 23 March 2014.

== Formations ==
The formations and former 101 series identities were as shown below.

DeHa (Mc)	DeHa (M)	KuHa (Tc)	Conversion date	Withdrawal date	Remarks
1001 (ex KuMoHa 100-117)	1101 (ex MoHa 101-100)	1201 (ex KuHa 101-58)	1 April 1986	12 October 2013	Repainted in sky blue livery 14 October 2007
1002 (ex KuMoHa 100-140)	1102 (ex MoHa 101-179)	1202 (ex KuHa 101-61)	1 April 1986	20 May 2012	Repainted in "100 series" style livery 30 May 2009
1003 (ex KuMoHa 100-133)	1103 (ex MoHa 101-118)	1203 (ex KuHa 101-62)	1 September 1986	2014	Repainted in orange livery 25 August 2011
1004 (ex KuMoHa 100-183)	1104 (ex MoHa 101-252)	1204 (ex KuHa 101-75)	1 November 1986	28 February 2009	
1005 (ex KuMoHa 100-166)	1105 (ex MoHa 101-222)	1205 (ex KuHa 101-64)	20 December 1986	13 December 2011	
1006 (ex KuMoHa 100-1013)	1106 (ex MoHa 101-1013)	1206 (ex KuHa 101-65)	20 January 1986	31 March 2009	
1007 (ex KuMoHa 100-130)	1107 (ex MoHa 101-112)	1207 (ex KuHa 101-66)	1 April 1987	8 December 2012	Repainted in yellow Chichibu Railway livery 3 October 2009
1008 (ex KuMoHa 100-154)	1108 (ex MoHa 101-212)	1208 (ex KuHa 101-79)	29 March 1989	23 August 2011	
1009 (ex KuMoHa 100-174)	1109 (ex MoHa 101-236)	1209 (ex KuHa 101-80)	20 April 1989	19 February 2011	Repainted in light green with yellow stripe 5 April 2008
1010 (ex KuMoHa 100-160)	1110 (ex MoHa 101-208)	1210 (ex KuHa 101-73)	23 September 1989	2014	
1011 (ex KuMoHa 100-175)	1111 (ex MoHa 101-237)	1211 (ex KuHa 101-81)	18 October 1989	25 March 2010	Repainted in orange livery 1 September 2007
1012 (ex KuMoHa 100-192)	1112 (ex MoHa 101-263)	1212 (ex KuHa 101-82)	27 December 1989	3 December 2010	Repainted in yellow livery 24 November 2009

The DeHa 1000 car was fitted with two lozenge-type pantographs.

== Livery variations ==
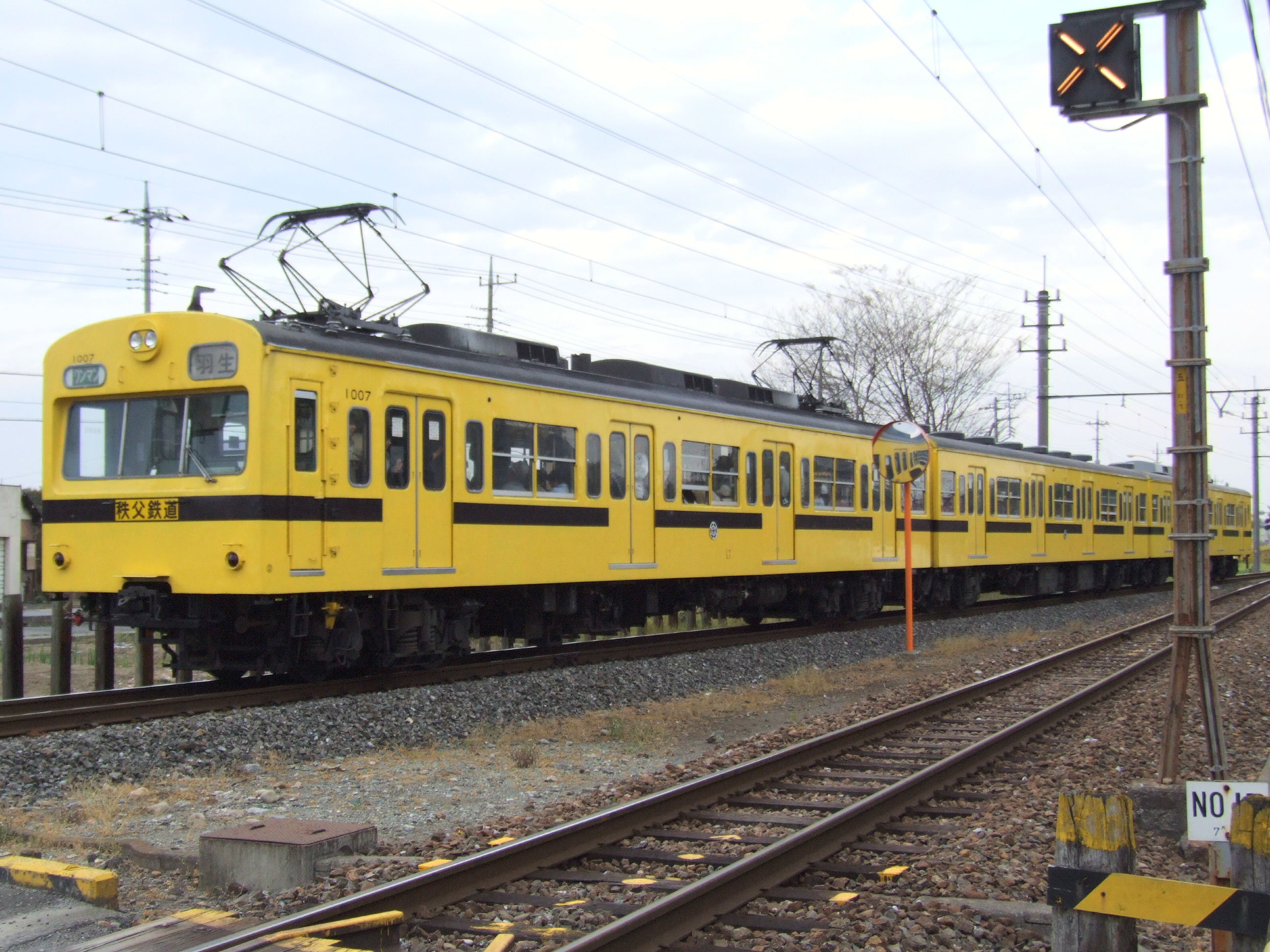
Set 1007 repainted into the original livery carried until the 1990s (April 2010)

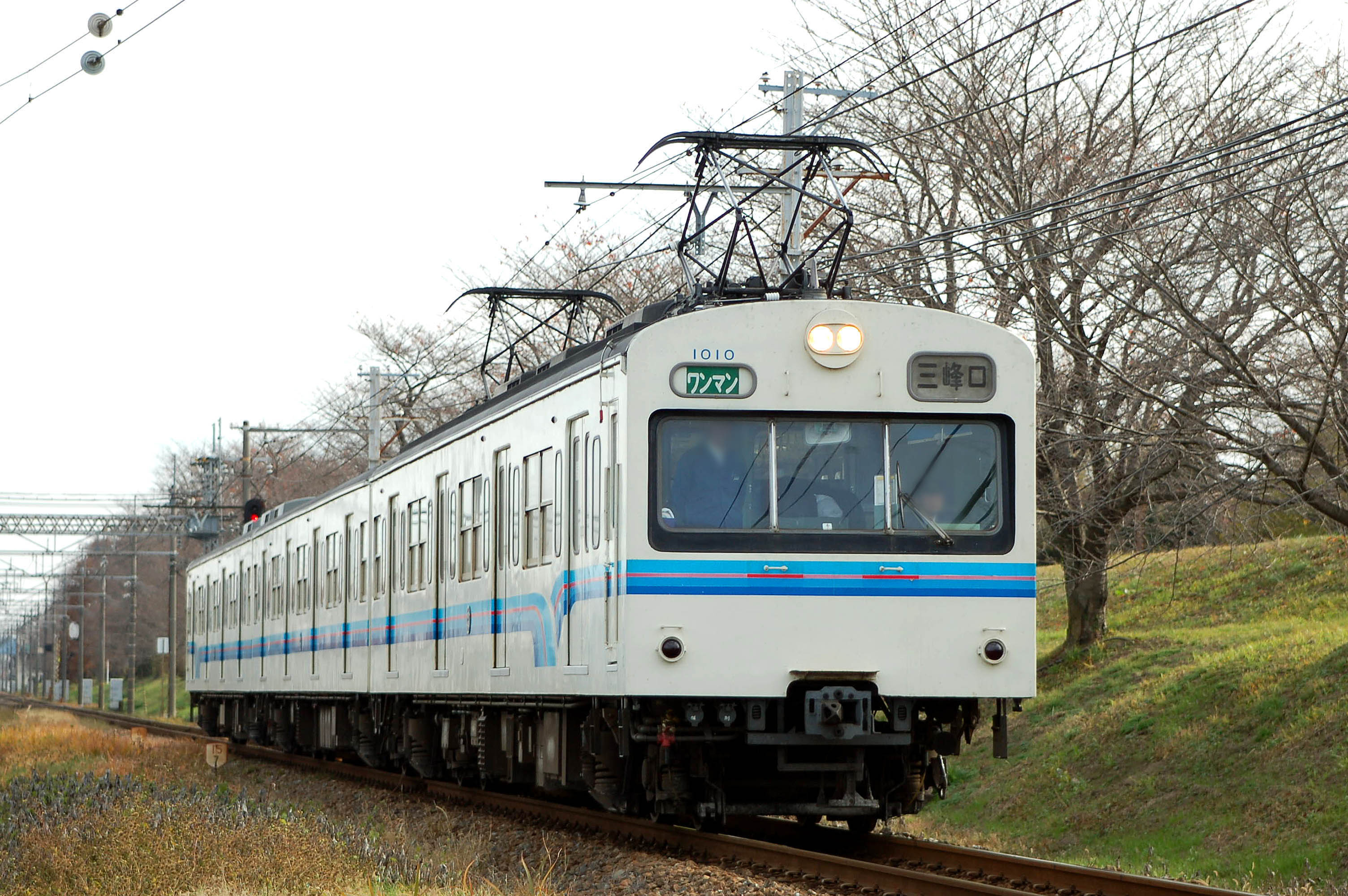
Set 1010 in the second livery carried from the 1990s (December 2007)

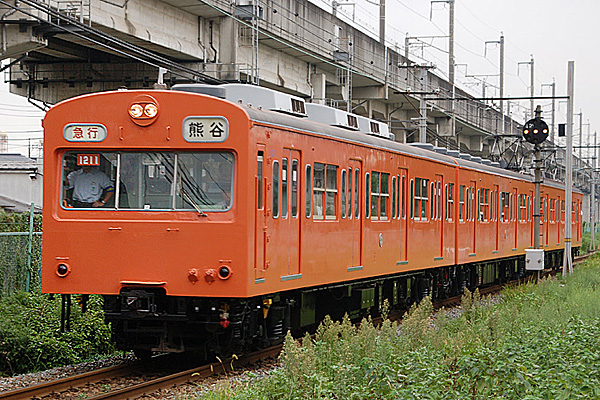
Set 1011 repainted into JNR orange livery (September 2007)

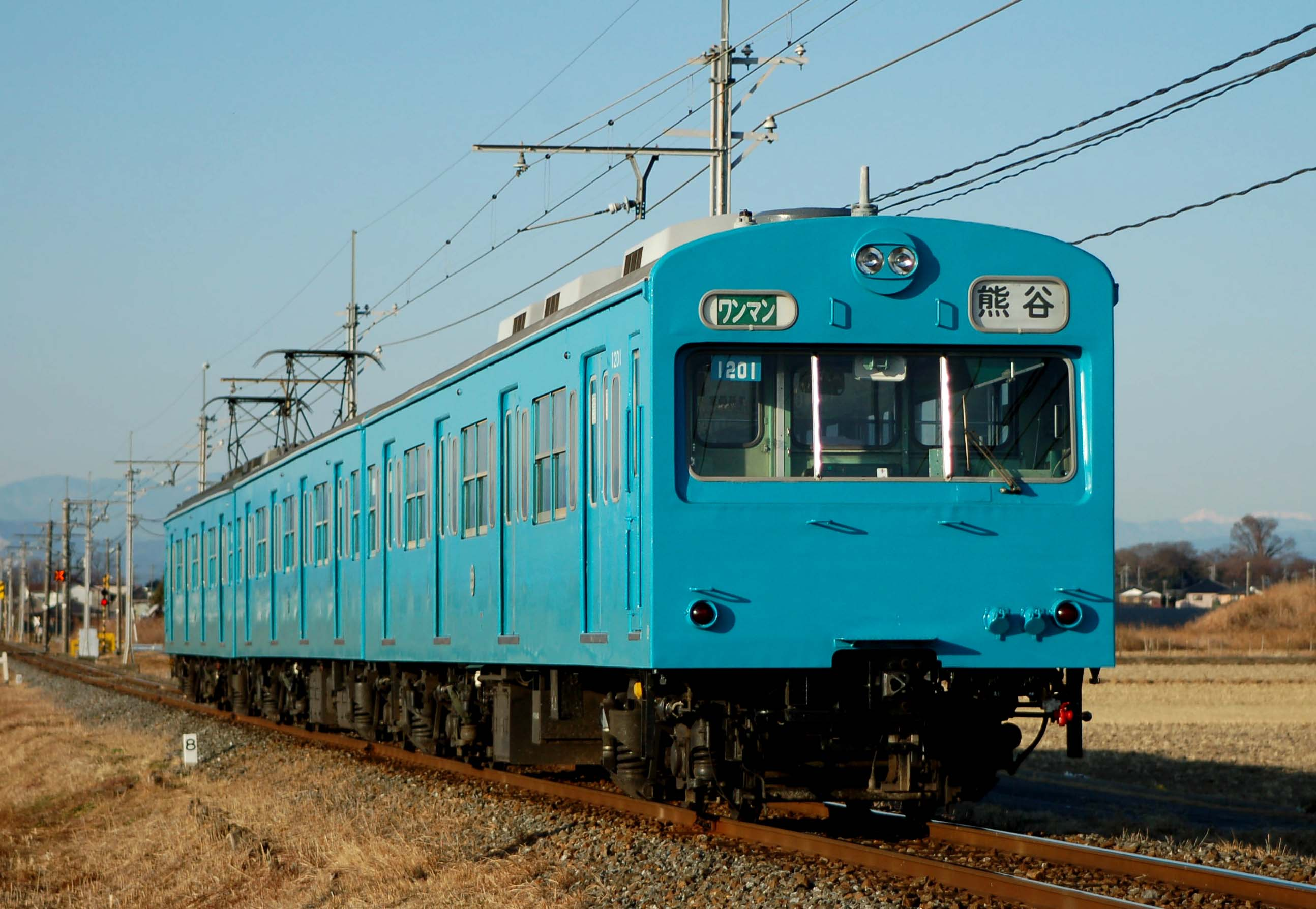
Set 1001 repainted into JNR sky blue livery (January 2008)

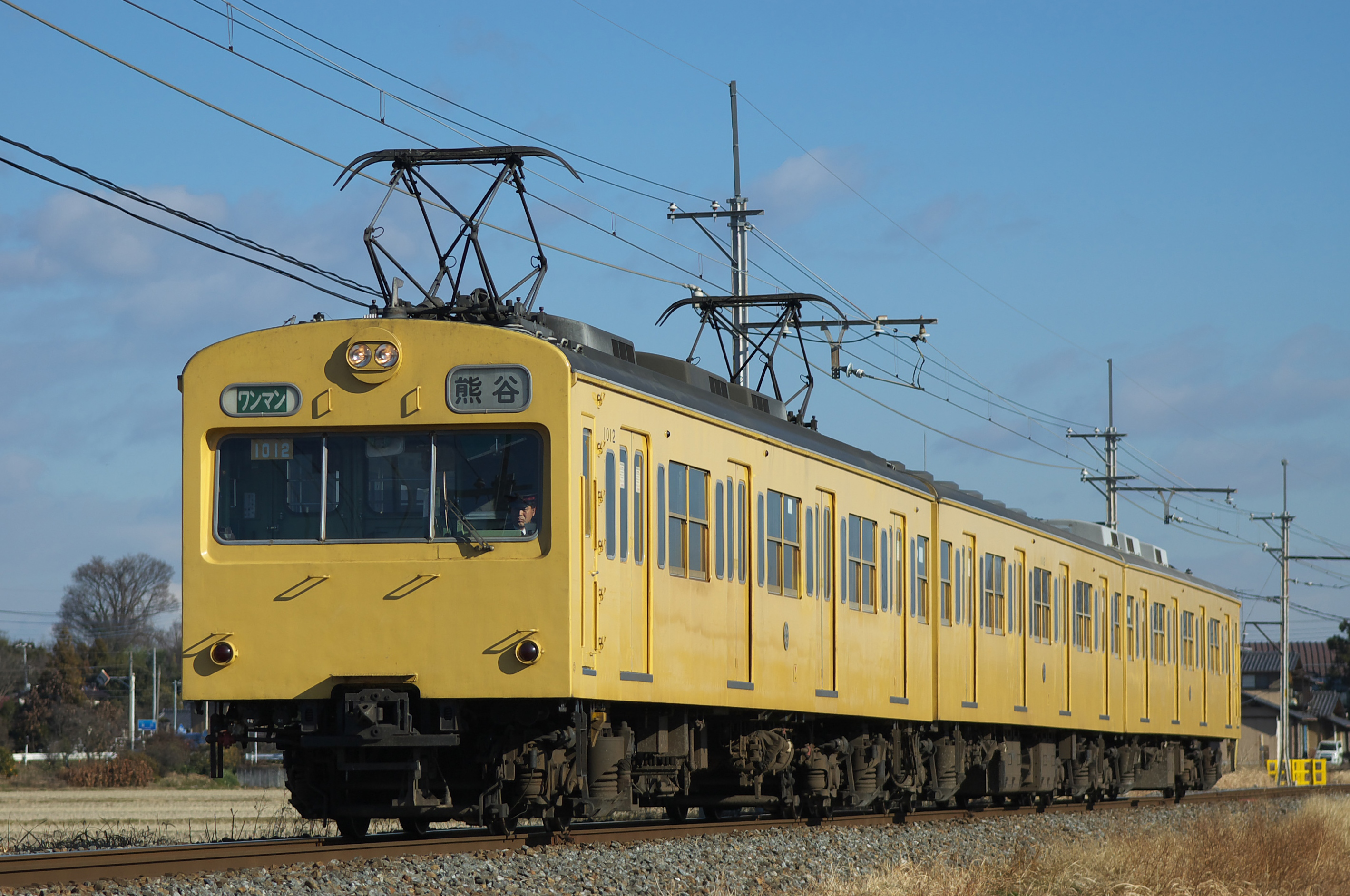
Set 1012 repainted into JNR canary yellow livery (January 2009)

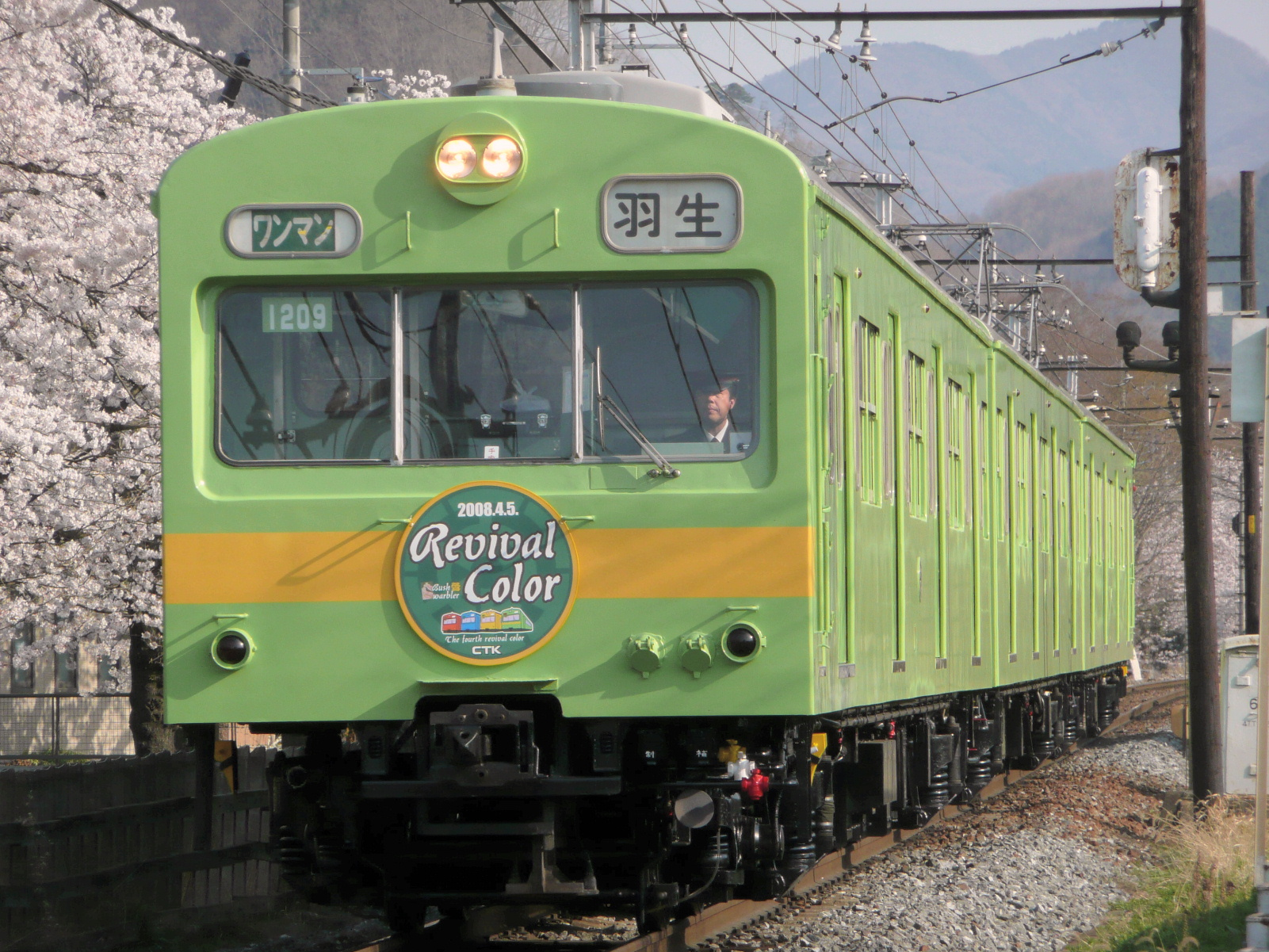
Set 1009 repainted into JR Kansai area light green livery (April 2008)

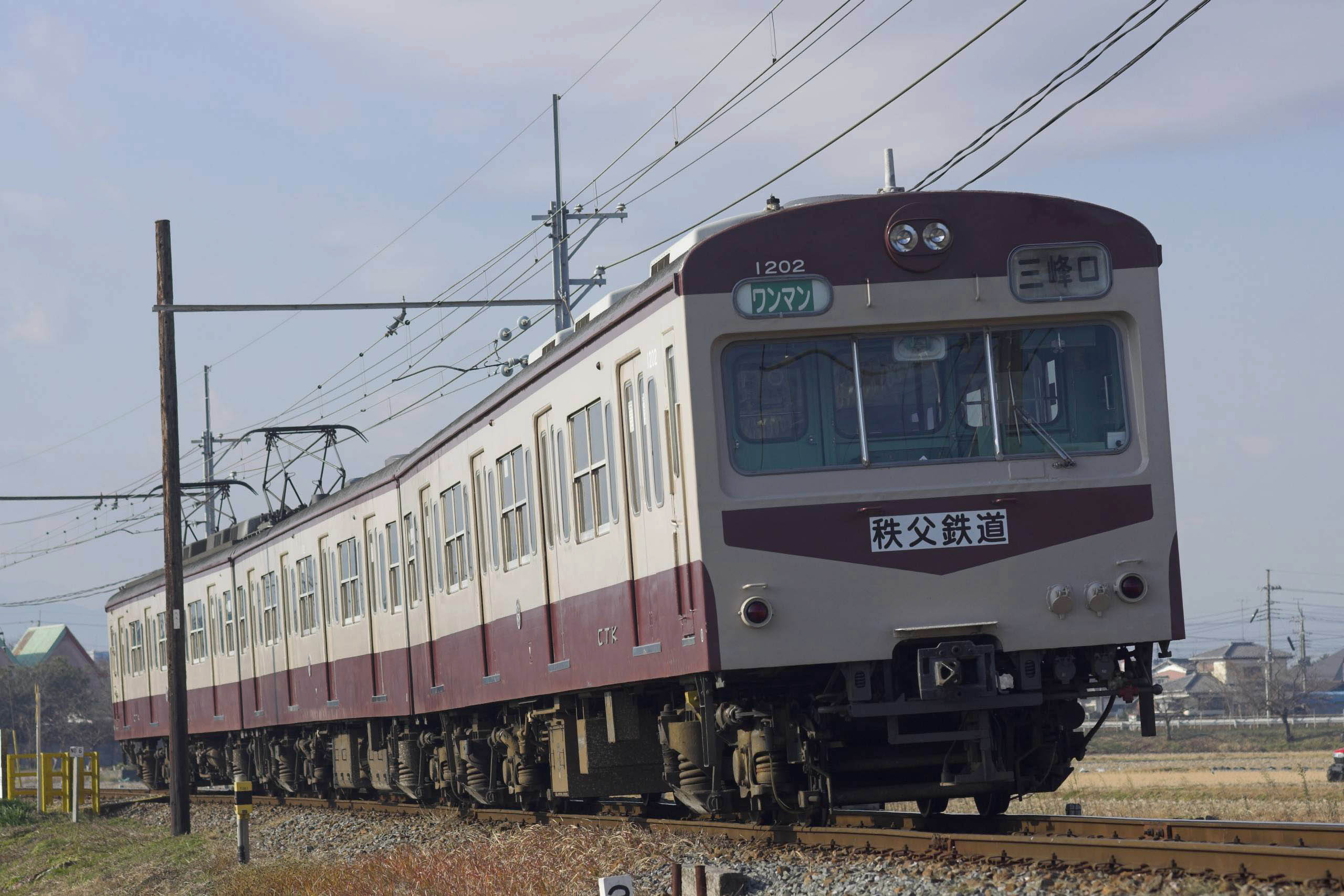
Set 1002 repainted into the early Chichibu Railway livery (not originally carried by these EMUs) (January 2010)
