= List of cities in Gunma Prefecture by population =

The following list sorts all cities (including towns and villages) in the Japanese prefecture of Gunma with a population of more than 10,000 according to the 2020 Census. As of October 1, 2020, 24 places fulfill this criterion and are listed here. This list refers only to the population of individual cities, towns and villages within their defined limits, which does not include other municipalities or suburban areas within urban agglomerations.

== List ==
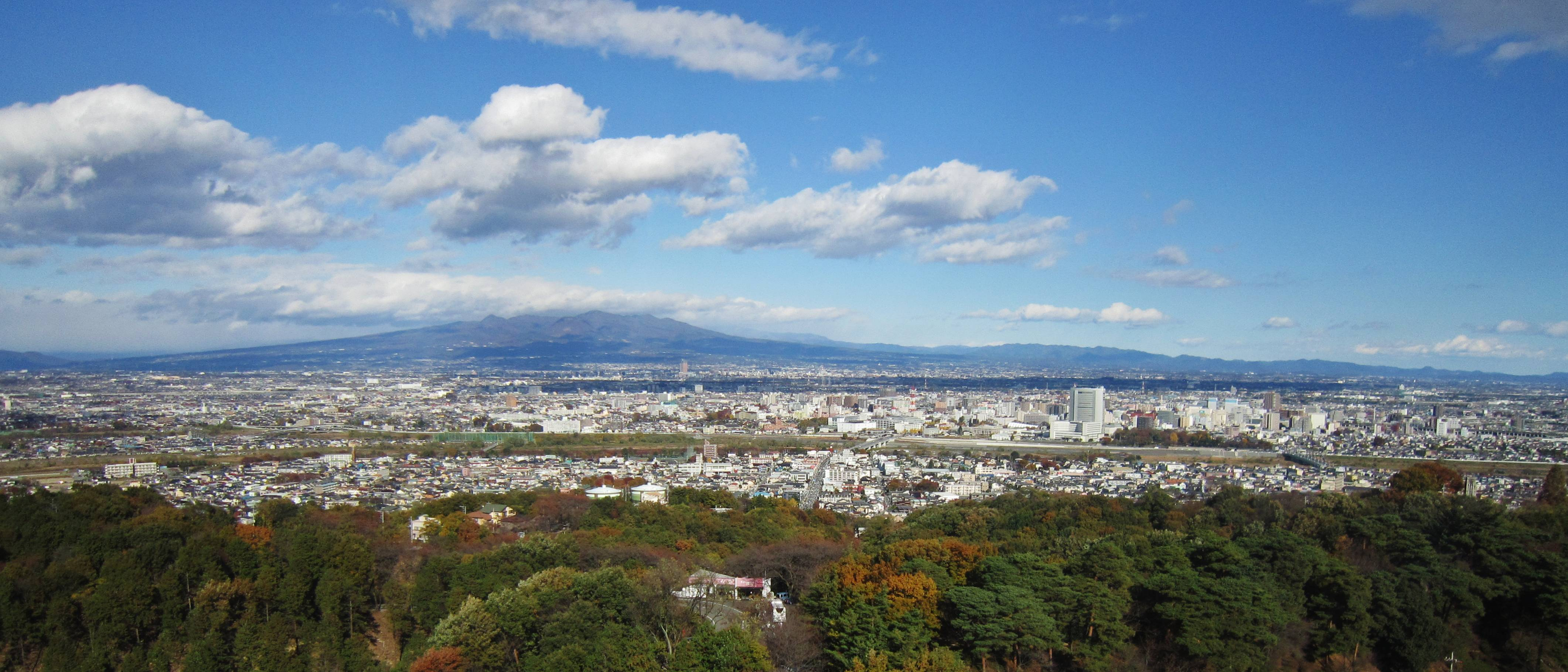
Takasaki

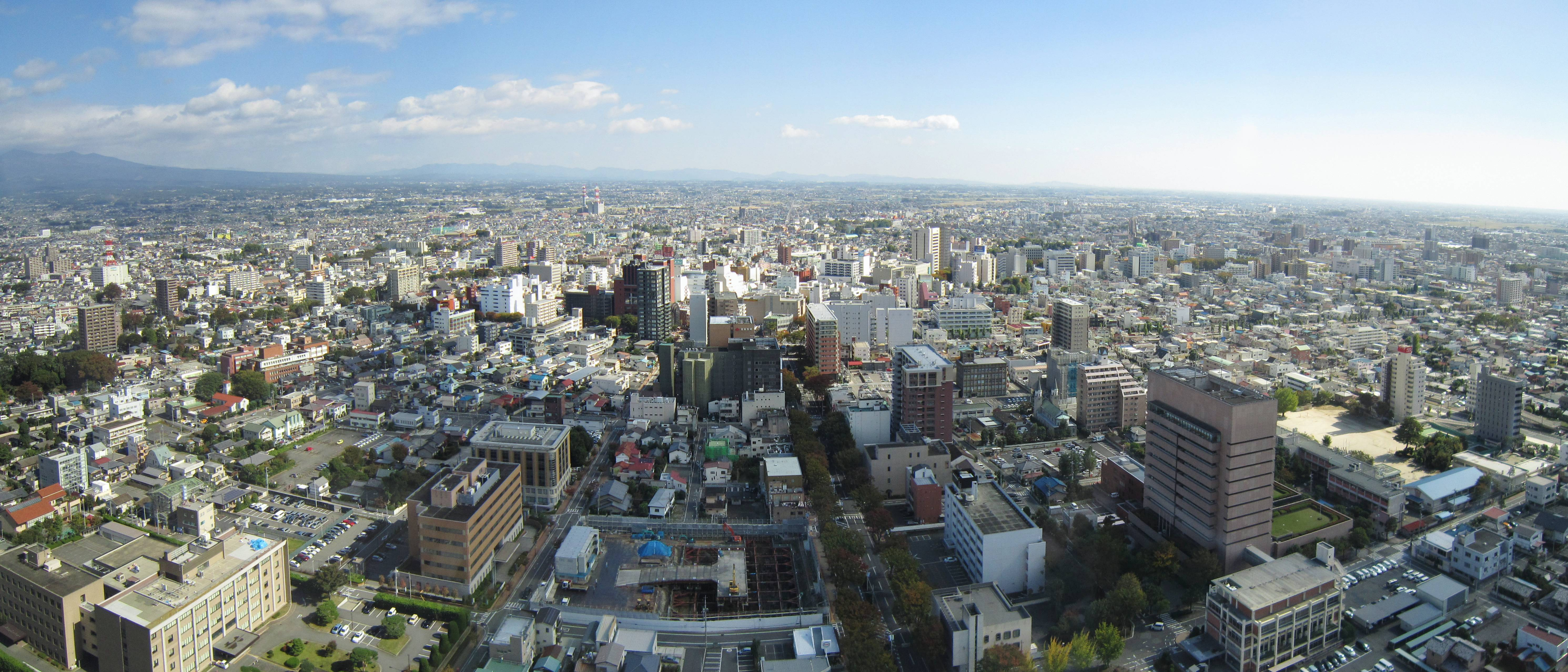
Maebashi

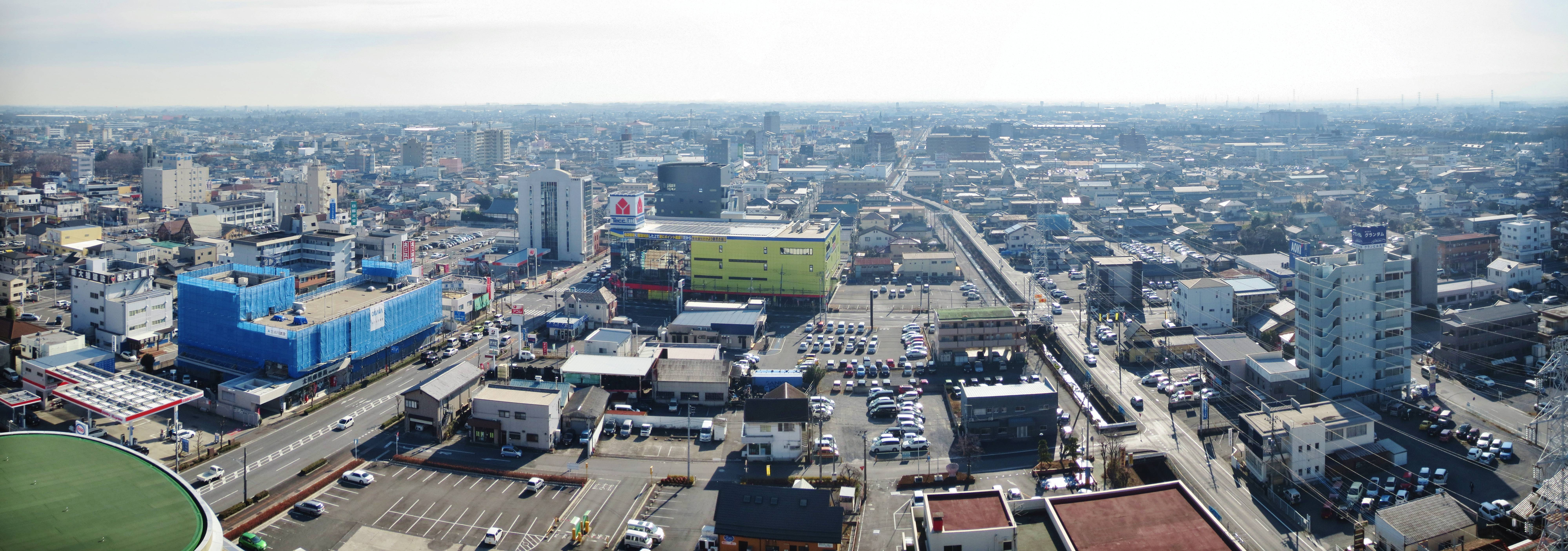
Ōta

The following table lists the 24 cities, villages and towns in Gunma with a population of at least 10,000 on October 1, 2020, according to the 2020 Census. The table also gives an overview of the evolution of the population since the 1995 census.

Rank (2020)	Name	Status	2020	2015	2010	2005	2000	1995
1	Takasaki	City	373,218	370,884	371,302	364,919	358,465	353,879
2	Maebashi	City	332,332	336,154	340,291	340,904	341,738	338,845
3	Ōta	City	223,150	219,807	216,465	213,160	210,022	203,599
4	Isesaki	City	211,975	208,814	207,221	202,447	194,393	184,420
5	Kiryū	City	106,524	114,714	121,704	128,037	134,298	138,193
6	Tatebayashi	City	75,335	76,667	78,608	79,454	79,371	76,857
7	Shibukawa	City	74,614	78,391	83,330	87,469	89,795	91,162
8	Fujioka	City	63,299	65,708	67,975	69,288	70,220	70,528
9	Annaka	City	54,962	58,531	61,077	63,179	64,893	64,853
10	Midori	City	49,663	50,906	51,899	52,115	51,266	50,983
11	Tomioka	City	47,470	49,746	52,070	53,765	54,401	54,435
12	Numata	City	45,382	48,676	51,265	53,177	55,278	56,344
13	Ōizumi	Town	42,107	41,202	40,257	41,466	41,403	41,100
14	Tamamura	Town	36,073	36,654	37,536	38,168	37,522	34,244
15	Ōra	Town	25,537	26,426	27,023	27,372	27,512	27,421
16	Yoshioka	Town	21,817	21,080	19,801	18,060	16,504	15,171
17	Minakami	Town	17,233	19,347	21,345	23,310	25,079	26,252
18	Nakanojō	Town	15,396	16,850	18,216	19,398	20,389	21,056
19	Shintō	Village	14,222	14,329	14,370	14,158	13,334	12,551
20	Itakura	Town	14,101	15,015	15,706	15,865	15,946	15,533
21	Higashiagatsuma	Town	12,741	14,033	15,622	16,847	17,689	18,420
22	Kanra	Town	12,481	13,200	13,618	14,313	14,660	14,481
23	Meiwa	Town	10,884	11,044	11,209	11,326	11,474	11,255
24	Chiyoda	Town	10,857	11,318	11,473	11,620	11,602	11,758
