= Fukushima Prefecture salient =

Panhandle in Fukushima, Japan

Coordinates: 37.853°N 139.715°E

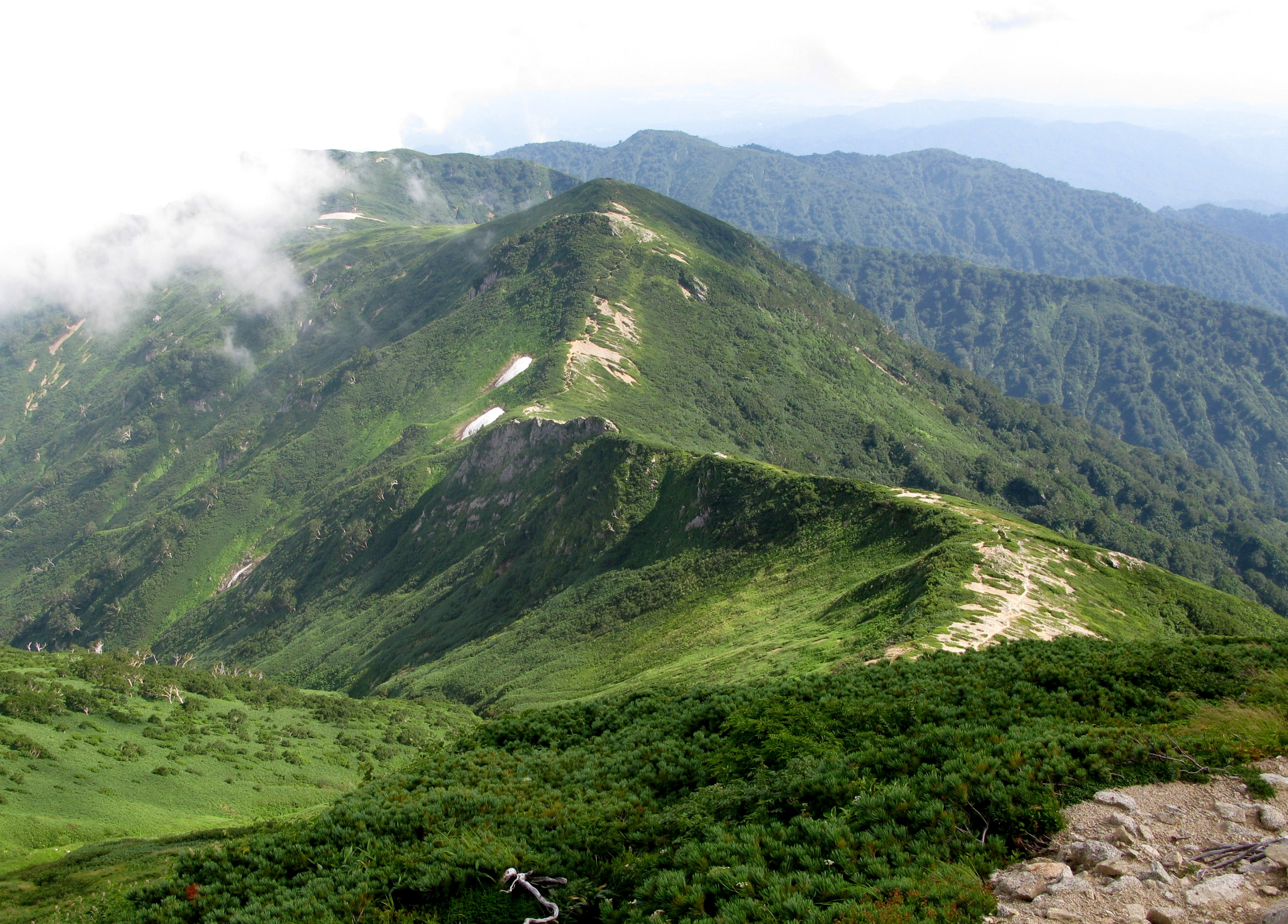
Part of the trail that leads to Mount Iide Shrine.

The Fukushima Prefecture salient, known colloquially as the "umbilical cord" (Japanese: へその緒県境, Hepburn: Hesonoo Kenkyō) or the "appendix prefectural border" (盲腸県境, Mōchō Kenkyō) is a panhandle and a hiking trail in Fukushima Prefecture in Japan. It consists of a narrow strip of land which lies between Yamagata Prefecture and Niigata Prefecture, passes across the summit of Mount Iide, and ends on the summit of Mount Onishi.

== Geography ==
Location of Mount Iide Shrine on the Panhandle

The panhandle is located in the northwest of Fukushima Prefecture on the borders with Yamagata Prefecture and Niigata Prefecture. It is part of the city of Kitakata. It is about 8 kilometers (5.0 mi) long, starting from the summit of Mount Mikuni, passing through the summit of Mount Iide, and ending on the summit of Mount Onishi. It is about 90 centimetres (35 in) at its narrowest. It follows the ridge of Mount Kengamine.

== History ==
According to Hiromichi Ozawa of the Fukushima Folklore Society, a border dispute started in 1886 between Fukushima and Niigata, when the Fukushima Prefectural Assembly decided to move the capital of Fukushima from Fukushima City to Koriyama due to Fukushima City's poor transportation access to the rest of the prefecture during that time. This was stopped by the government by transferring the Higashikanbara District to Niigata. Ichinokimura protested the transfer because the summit of Mount Iide and Mount Iide Shrine were also transferred into Niigata Prefecture. The village presented historical evidence that Mount Iide Shrine was part of the Aizu clan. The border dispute lasted until 1907, when the national government conducted a field survey and officially recognized the Mount Iide Shrine and the trails leading to the shrine as part of Fukushima, creating the panhandle. The panhandle reaches the summit of Mount Onishi because people during that time believed that the Mount Iide Shrine extended to the summit of the mountain based on an emakimono from the Edo period that depicts people making a pilgrimage to the Mount Iide Shrine.

== Trail ==
There are two refuge huts located along the panhandle. The mountain trail that runs through the panhandle is composed of steep slopes ranging from 100 metres (330 ft) to 200 metres (660 ft) in height and leads to Mount Iide Shrine at the summit of Mount Iide. It is a rocky and unpaved trail, which was described by the broadcasting company MBS as "a cliff rather than a trail" and challenging to navigate. Takao Nakagawa of Shūkan Gendai Online describes that trail towards the tripoint at the end of the panhandle as the hardest to access, comparing it to the Tochigi–Gunma–Saitama border, which is the easiest.

== Flora ==
Lilium rubellum, a species of the Liliaceae family, is endemic to the area.

== See also ==
- Bandai-Asahi National Park
- Iide Mountains
