= Caroline Dormon =

American scientist, artist, and author (1888–1971)

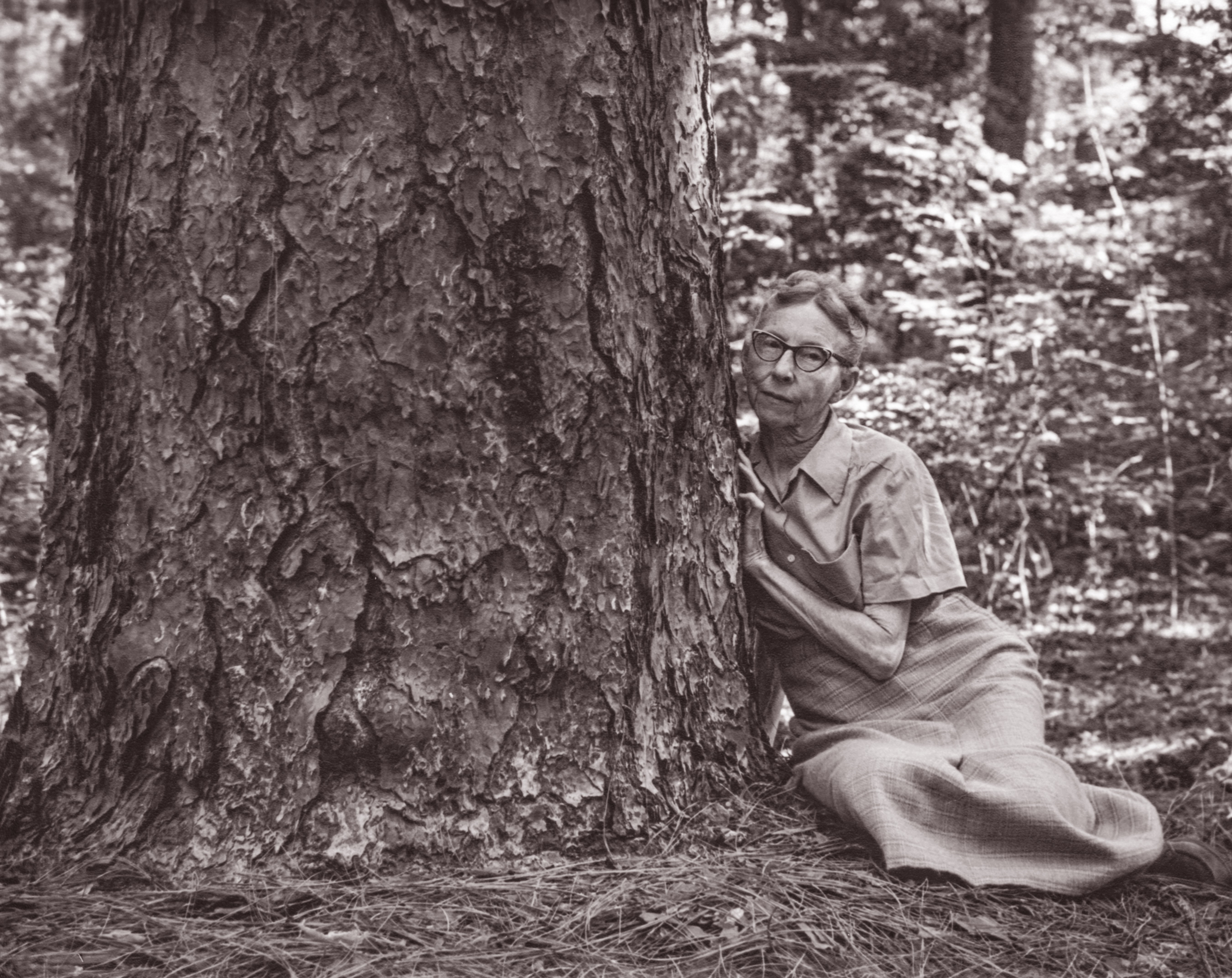
Dormon with "Grandpappy", her favourite longleaf pine at Briarwood

Caroline "Carrie" Coroneos Dormon (July 19, 1888 – November 21, 1971) was an American naturalist, ethnographer, and writer in Louisiana. She was a pioneer conservationist and was involved in the establishment of the Kisatchie National Forest and was also the first woman to work in environmental education in public schools as part of the Division of Forestry in Louisiana.

== Biography ==
Dormon was born at "Briarwood" near Saline, Louisiana to lawyer James Alexander and Caroline Trotti. The family also had a second home in Arcadia. Her mother was a writer and took an interest in gardening and Carrie too grew up with an interest in plants, and learned writing at the age of three. Along with her seven siblings she received a college education, she graduated from Judson College in 1907 with a degree in literature and art. She lost her mother around the same time and their family home in Arcadia along with a valuable library was lost in a fire. She then taught in public schools before moving in 1918 with her sister Virginia into a log-cabin at Briarwood. Concerned by the decline of old-growth forests due to logging, she sought protection for some remaining patches. In 1921 she was invited to work in the forestry department, initially with public relations and later in extension and education from 1927 under W.R. Hine but she quit in 1928 when Huey Long became a governor. She attended meetings and wrote numerous letters to officials; in 1929 an old-growth forest tract was selected for protection and Dormon suggested the name for it as "Kitsachie", the name used for Kichai Indians and meaning "long cane".

Dormon also took an interest in archaeology and the ethnography of local Indians. She was respected by the local Indians and there was utilized by archaeologists from the Smithsonian who worked in the region. She received an honorary doctorate in 1965 from the Louisiana State University.

A 2025 article described her as "a Louisiana legend" and that "Dormon's interests and expertise spanned forestry, botany, horticulture, conservation, ornithology, archaeology, ethnology, literature, art, education, and preservation, all fueled by an unassuming yet steadfast passion for all things wild."

== Conservation legacy ==
Caroline Dormon is nationally known for the role she played in achieving conservation protection for some 600,000 acres as Louisiana's sole national forest: the Kisatchie National Forest. Family lands she lived upon for most of her life carry forward her successful westward experimental plantings of several southeastern native trees and shrubs: bigleaf magnolia, Florida anise, Florida torreya, mountain laurel, and osmanthus. Her hybridizing achievements of Louisiana iris are also maintained for public and scientific viewing and study. These 212 acres of her beloved "Briarwood" are now the Caroline Dormon Nature Preserve and managed by a foundation that offers educational opportunities, native plant sales, and viewing for the public.

== Writings ==
She wrote several books including:

- Wild Flowers of Louisiana (1934)
- Forest Trees of Louisiana (1941)
- Flowers Native to the Deep South (1958)
- Natives Preferred (1965)
- Southern Indian Boy (1967)
- Bird Talk (1969)
