= Kentarō Shinogi =

Japanese baseball player (born 2002)

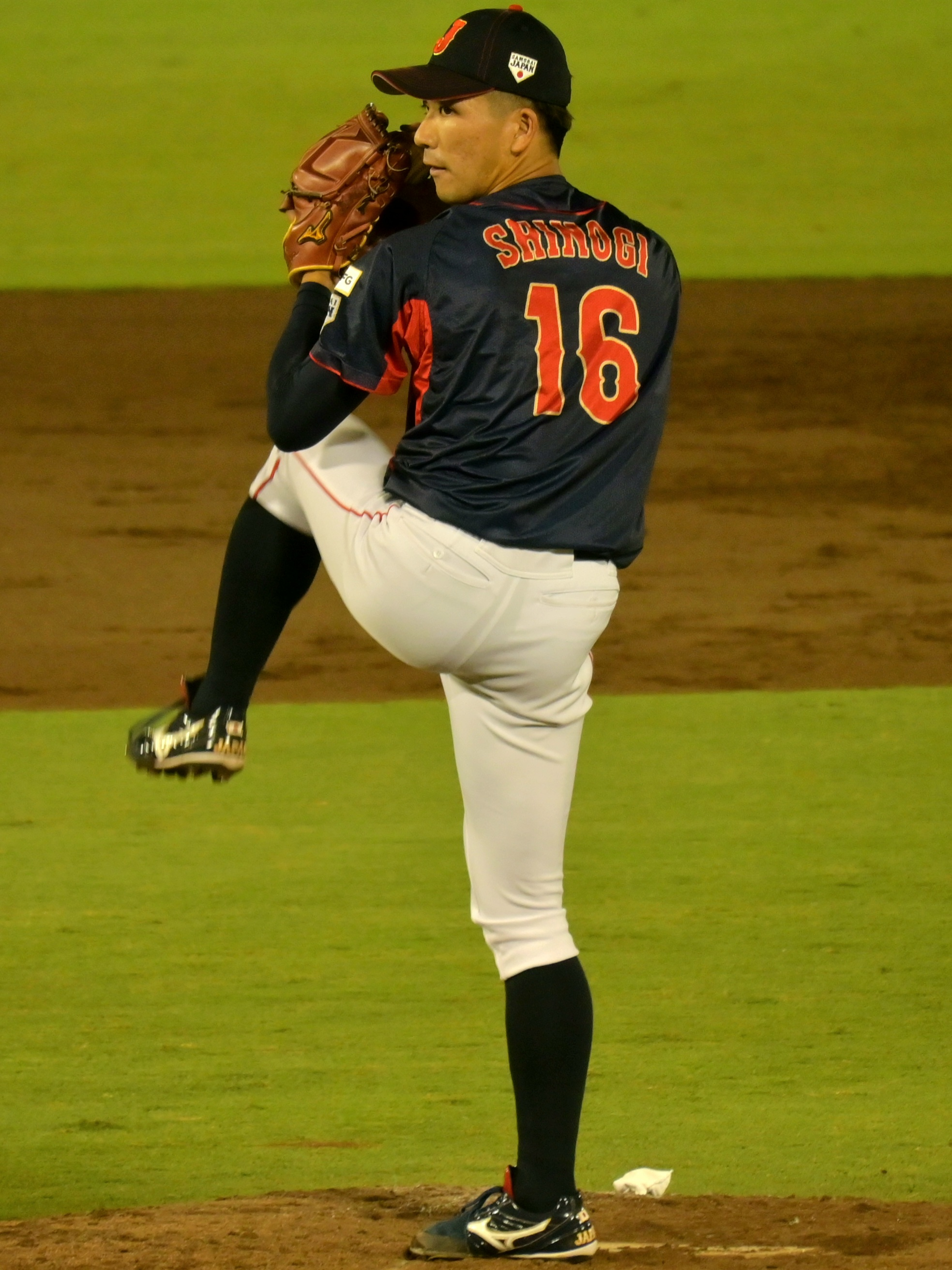

Yokohama DeNA BayStars – No. 30
- Pitcher
- Born: May 7, 2002 (age 24); Meiwa, Gunma, Japan
- Bats: Left Throws: Right

NPB debut
- April 2, 2025, for the Yokohama DeNA BayStars

Career statistics (through August 1, 2026)
- Win-Loss: 5–3
- ERA: 5.00
- Strikeouts: 51

Teams
- Yokohama DeNA BayStars (2025–Present)

Kentarō Shinogi (篠木 健太郎, Shinogi Kentarõ; born May 7, 2002 in Meiwa, Gunma, Japan) is a professional Japanese baseball player. He pitches for the Yokohama DeNA BayStars.

Shinogi was selected in the 2nd round of the 2024 Nippon Professional Baseball draft.
