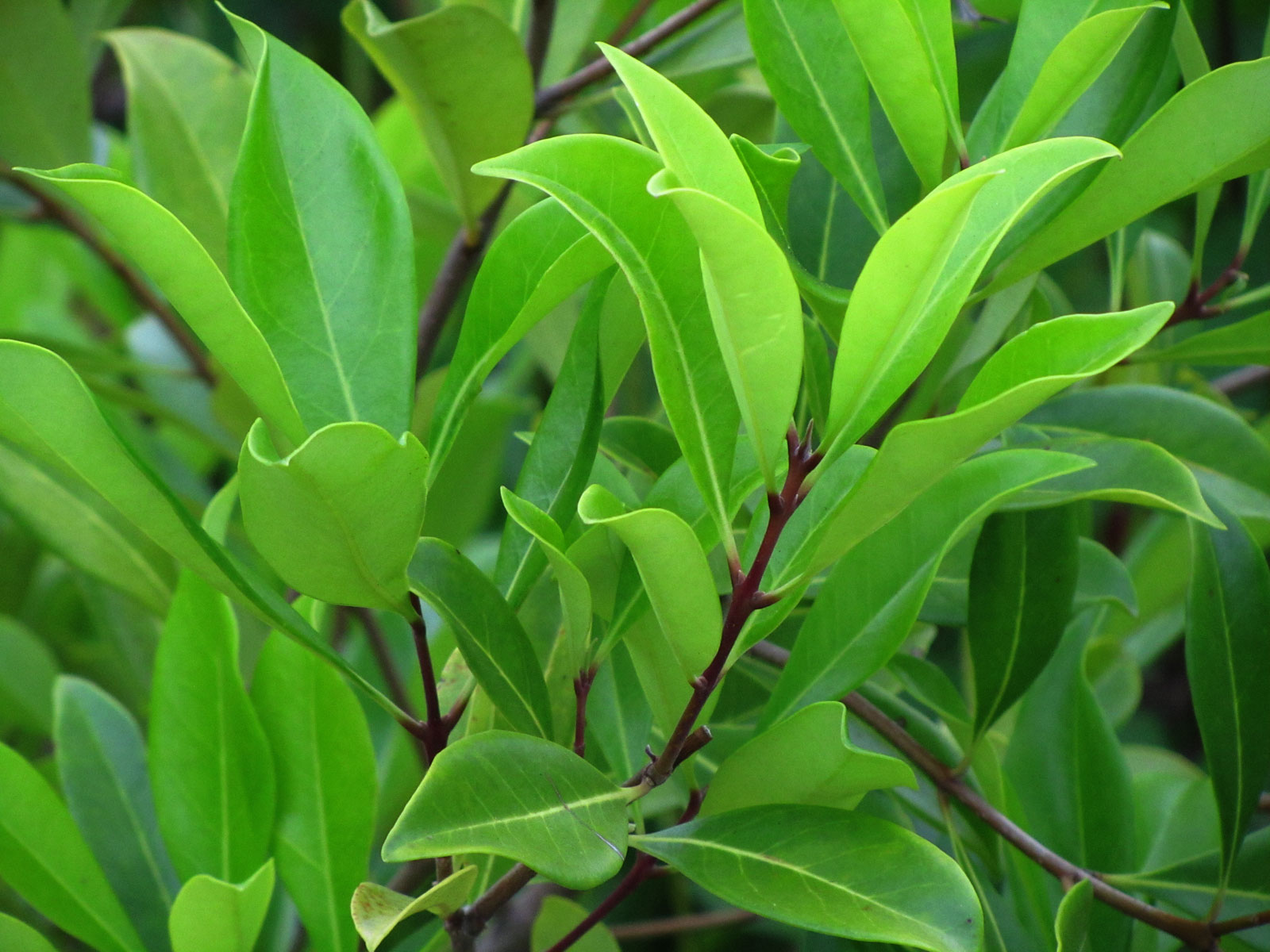
- Cartrema americana

Scientific classification
- Kingdom: Plantae
- Clade: Tracheophytes
- Clade: Angiosperms
- Clade: Eudicots
- Clade: Asterids
- Order: Lamiales
- Family: Oleaceae
- Tribe: Oleeae
- Subtribe: Oleinae
- Genus: Cartrema; Raf.

Synonyms
- Pausia Raf. nom. inval.; Amarolea Small

= Cartrema =

Genus of flowering plants

Cartrema is a genus of a few species of flowering plants in the family Oleaceae, native to southeastern Asia, southern China, and North America (Mexico, Central America, southeastern United States), formerly treated as section Leiolea of Osmanthus. Species of Cartrema may be distinguished from those of Osmanthus by the paniculate inflorescences of the former.

== Species ==
Species accepted:

1. Cartrema americana (L.) G.L.Nesom – Devilwood – southeastern US from Texas to Virginia; eastern and southern Mexico
2. Cartrema floridana (Chapm.) G.L.Nesom - Florida
3. Cartrema marginata (Champ. ex Benth.) de Juana – Nansei-shoto, Taiwan, Vietnam, Anhui, Fujian, Guangdong, Guangxi, Guizhou, Hainan, Hunan, Jiangxi, Sichuan, Yunnan, Zhejiang
4. Cartrema matsumurana (Hayata) de Juana – Assam, Thailand, Laos, Cambodia, Vietnam, Anhui, Guangdong, Guangxi, Guizhou, Jiangxi, Taiwan, Yunnan, Zhejiang
5. Cartrema minor (P.S.Green) de Juana – Fujian, Guangdong, Guangxi, Jiangxi, Zhejiang
6. Cartrema scortechinii (King & Gamble) de Juana – Thailand, Sumatra, Pen Malaysia
7. Cartrema sumatrana (P.S.Green) de Juana – Sumatra
