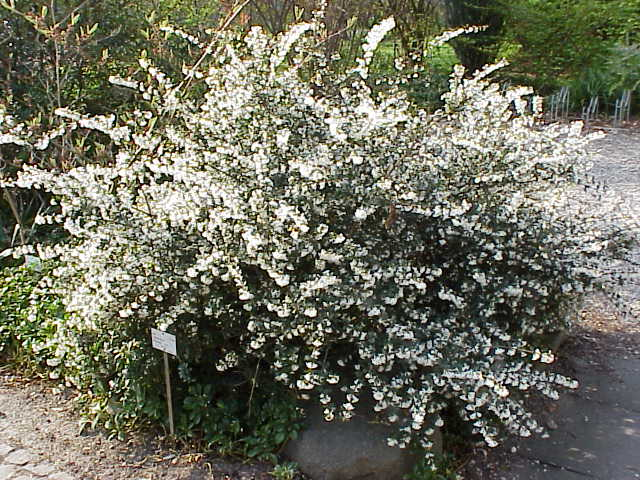

Scientific classification
- Kingdom: Plantae
- Clade: Tracheophytes
- Clade: Angiosperms
- Clade: Eudicots
- Clade: Asterids
- Order: Lamiales
- Family: Oleaceae
- Genus: Osmanthus
- Species: O. delavayi

Binomial name
- Osmanthus delavayi Franch.

Synonyms
- Ligustrum phillyrea H.Lév.; Siphonosmanthus delavayi (Franch.) Stapf

= Osmanthus delavayi =

Species of shrub

Osmanthus delavayi is a species of flowering plant in the olive family Oleaceae. It is an evergreen shrub native to the Guizhou, Sichuan and Yunnan regions of southern China, and widely cultivated as an ornamental in temperate and subtropical zones elsewhere.

== History ==
Osmanthus delavayi was discovered by the Jesuit missionary-botanist Fr Pierre Jean Marie Delavay in the mountains near Lan-kong in Yunnan province, China, in 1890. He sent seed to the French nurseryman Vilmorin. Though Maurice de Vilmorin distributed the seed among various correspondents, only a single seed germinated. All the O. delavayi of European gardens were cloned from this one source, until George Forrest obtained further supplies of seed in China after World War I.

== Description ==
Over several weeks in late winter to spring, Osmanthus delavayi bears fragrant flowers that are more prominent but less fragrant than Osmanthus fragrans, but substitutes for O. fragrans in less balmy gardens. The shrub currently holds an Award of Garden Merit from the Royal Horticultural Society which it first received in 1923 and has been praised by British garden writers. It is a garden staple in the east coast of Australia as far south as Tasmania. Its USDA Zone range is 7-9 (it can survive -15C), making it hardy in sheltered locations as far north as coastal New York and in the Pacific Northwest. It is a medium-sized shrub, eventually reaching up to 4 m (13 ft) tall and broad, though this may take up to 20 years, as the plant is relatively slow-growing.

== Osmanthus × burkwoodii ==
O. × burkwoodii, a garden hybrid of Osmanthus decorus × Osmanthus delavayi, (syn. ×Osmarea burkwoodii) is also a popular garden shrub, and has also won an Award of Garden Merit. Growing to 3 m (9.8 ft) tall and broad, it is somewhat more compact than O. delavayi. It is named after the brothers Arthur and Albert Burkwood, 19th century hybridisers.
