= Tochigi–Gunma–Saitama border =

Tripoint in Japan

- Sankenkyō (三県境)
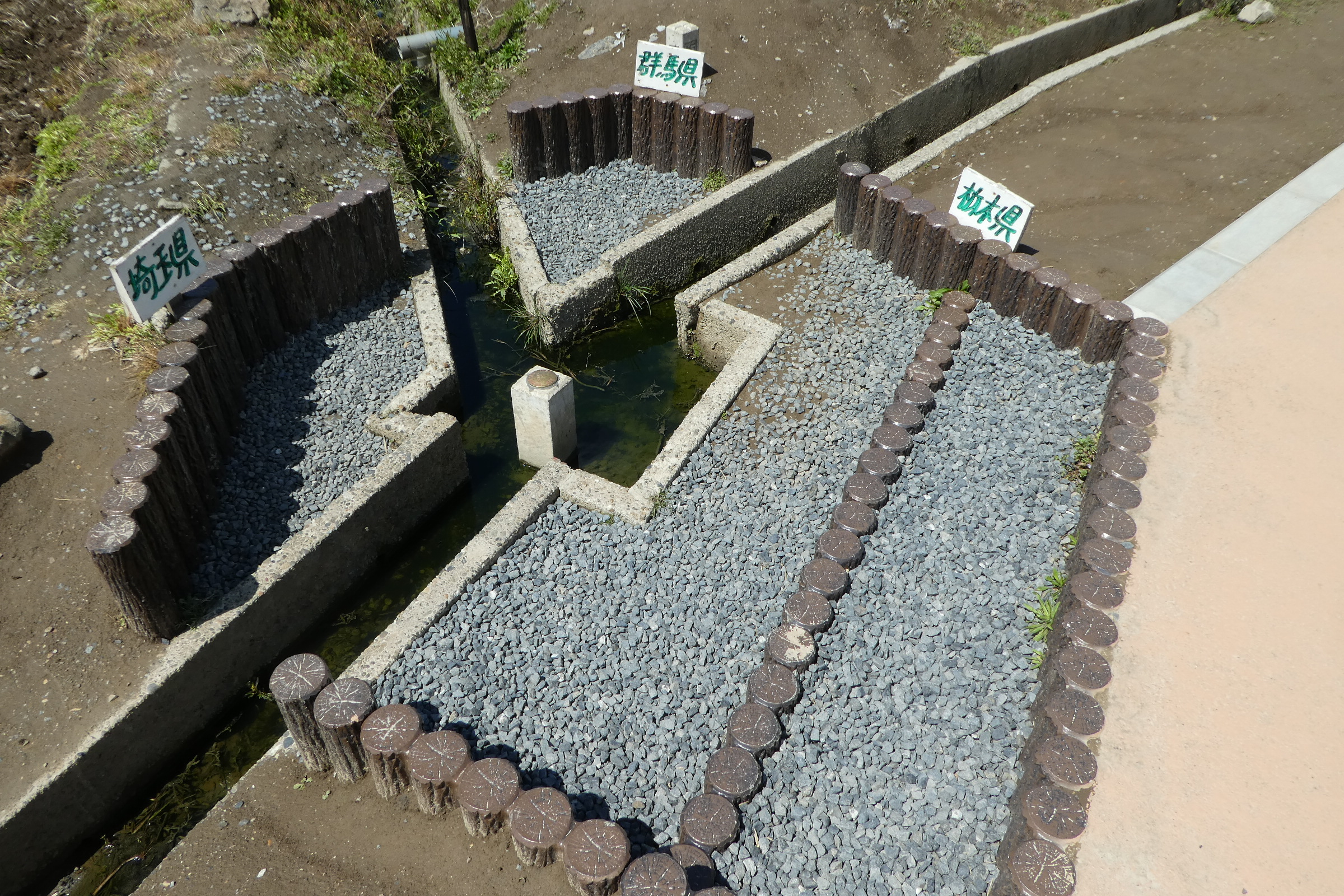
- The monument on the tripoint
- Interactive map of Tochigi–Gunma–Saitama border
- Coordinates: 36°12′27″N 139°39′50″E
- Opening date: March 31, 2016

The Tochigi–Gunma–Saitama border, or the Tochigi–Gunma–Saitama tripoint (Japanese: 栃木・群馬・埼玉の三県境, Hepburn: Tochigi-Gunma-Saitama no Sankenkyō), or simply Sankenkyō (三県境; lit. "Three prefectural borders"), is a tripoint between Tochigi Prefecture, Gunma Prefecture, and Saitama Prefecture in Japan. It is the only tripoint in Japan that is not located on a mountain or a river.

== Geography ==
Location within Kanto

The border is located southwest of the Watarase Reservoir, also known as Lake Yanaka. It is where the town of Itakura, Gunma, and the cities of Tochigi, Tochigi, and Kazo, Saitama meet. It is located about 5.4 kilometres (3.4 mi) east of Ikura, Gunma's town hall and about 400 metres (1,300 ft) east of Yagyu Station in Kazu, Saitama. Finding a "walkable" tripoint in Japan is rare: the other 40 tripoints are located on mountains or rivers.

== History ==
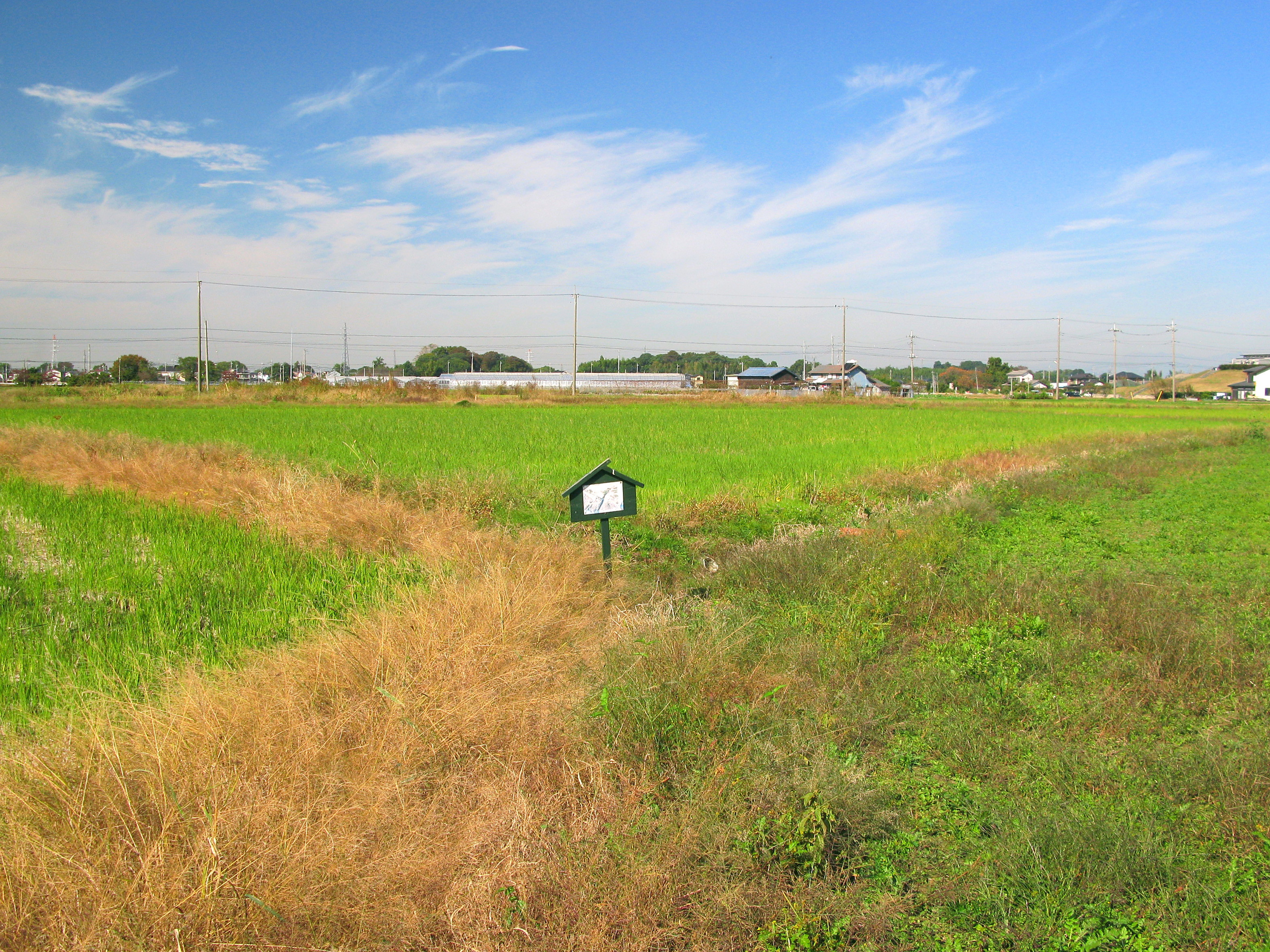
The border prior to development in 2011

Originally, the tripoint between Tochigi, Gunma, and Saitama was located on the Watarase River. The course was changed after the Ashio Copper Mine incident in the Meiji Era, which turned the area into a swamp and was later filled in with 2 metres (6.6 ft) of soil in the 1970s. It was later used as rice paddies, which were owned by Mitsuaki Furusawa—a resident from the Tochigi side, and a Y-shaped irrigation canal became the border.

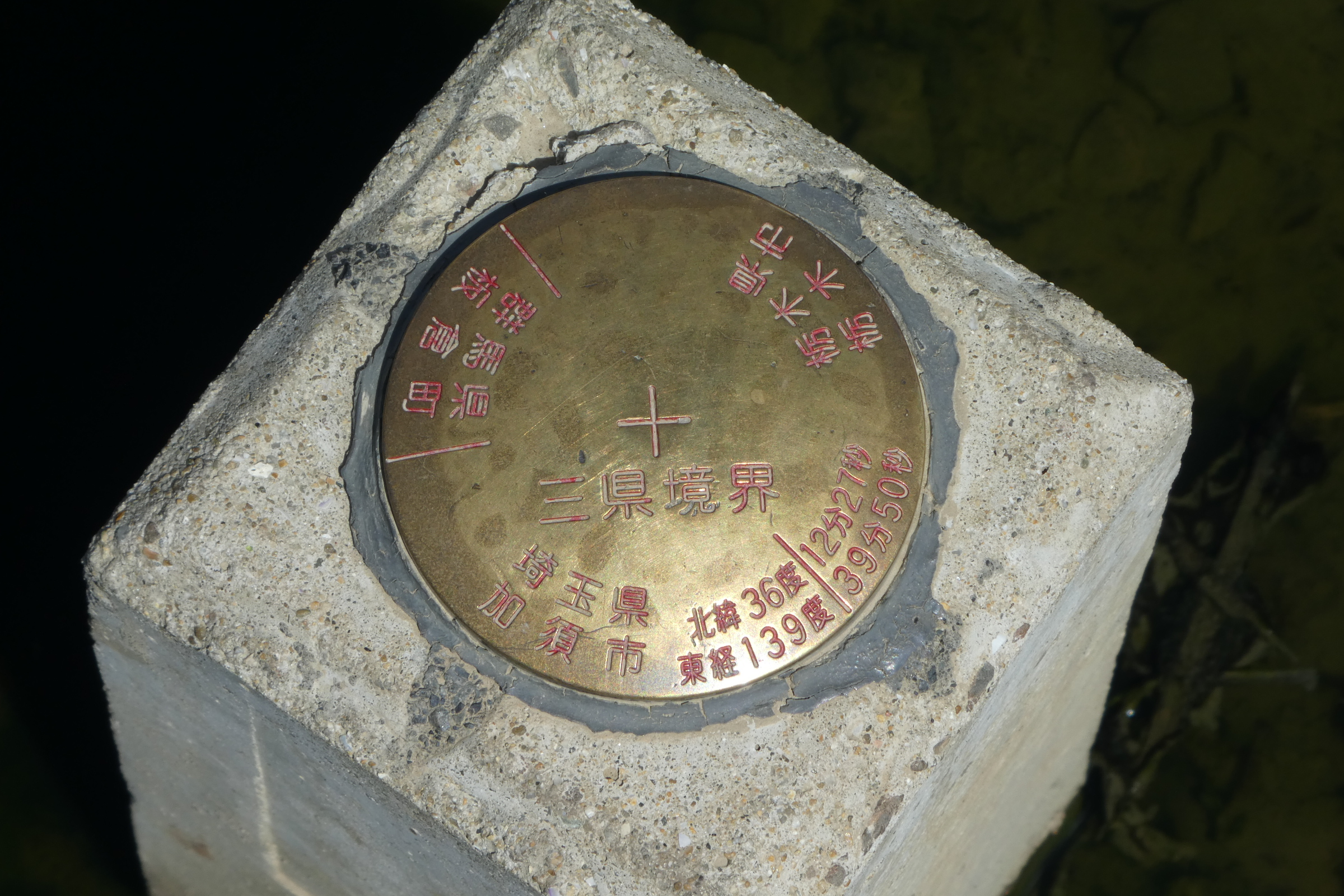
The brass plaque located at the tripoint

Joint discussions were conducted between the government of Itakura, Gunma, Tochigi City, Tochigi, and Kazo, Saitama, along with the Geospatial Information Authority of Japan from January 2015. A joint survey was conducted on February 9, 2016, confirming the tripoint was located at 36°12′27″N 139°39′50″E, the survey cost ¥1.3 million (2016) (US$11,949.31), which was split between the three cities and towns. A signing ceremony was conducted on March 31, 2016 between the three mayors of the towns and cities and Furusawa. A concrete pole with a 8 centimetres (3.1 in) brass plaque was erected at the border with the words "San Kenkyōkai" (三県境界, "Three Prefectural Borders").

A stamp rally was held in the area from February to March 2017. Due to the growing number of tourists visiting the area, the three towns and cities bought the land and constructed a promenade, which was finished in April 2018.

== See also ==
- List of tripoints
- Four Corners
- Umbilical Cord (Fukushima)
- Hyōtanjima
