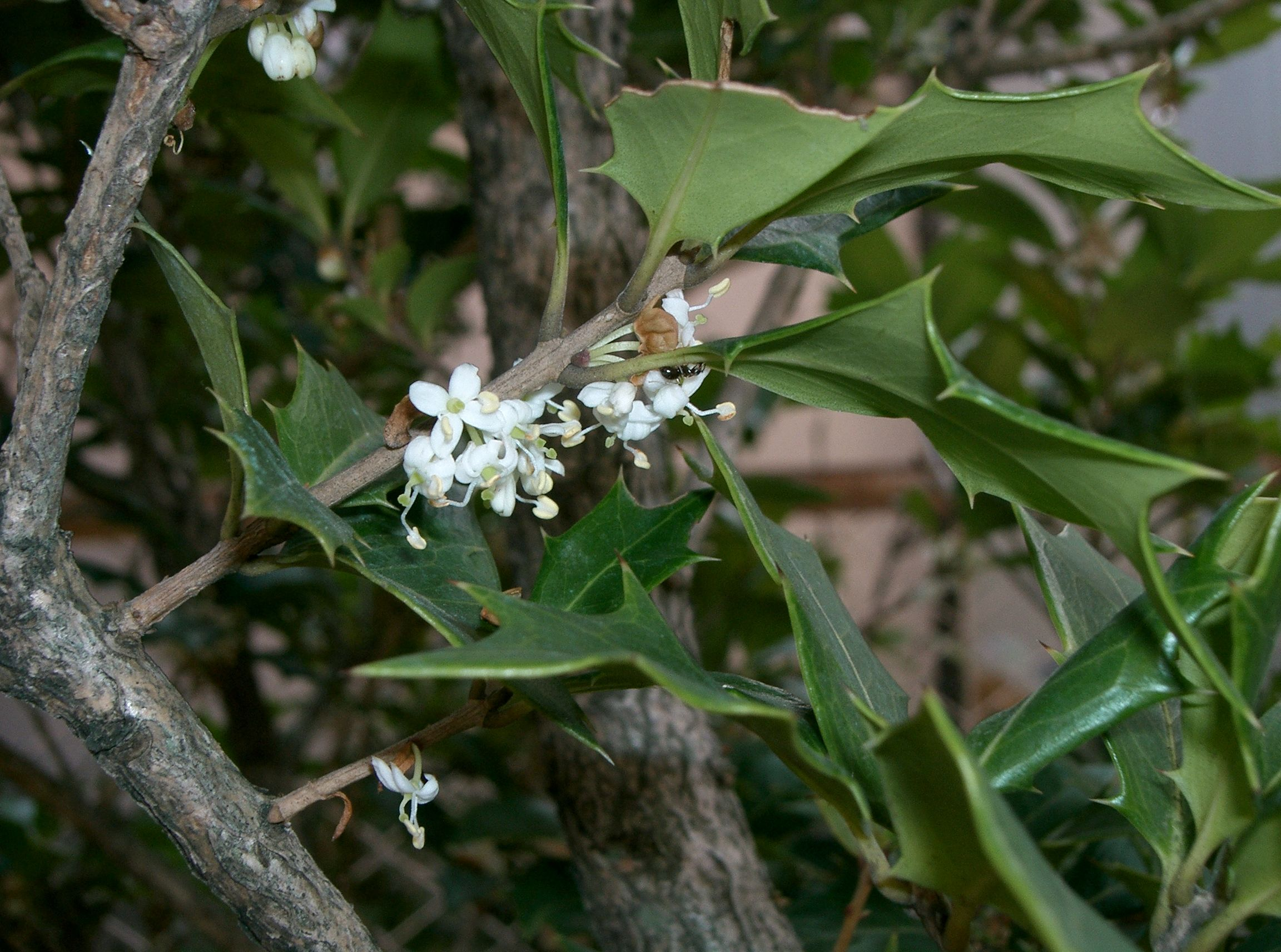
- Hiiragi in flower in Osaka

Scientific classification
- Kingdom: Plantae
- Clade: Tracheophytes
- Clade: Angiosperms
- Clade: Eudicots
- Clade: Asterids
- Order: Lamiales
- Family: Oleaceae
- Genus: Osmanthus
- Species: O. heterophyllus

Binomial name
- Osmanthus heterophyllus (G.Don) P.S.Green

Synonyms
- Ilex heterophylla G. Don; Olea aquifolium Siebold & Zucc.; Olea ilicifolia Hassk.; Olea rotundifolia (H.Jaeger) Entleutner; Osmanthus acutus Masam. & T.Mori; Osmanthus aquifolium (Thunb.) Siebold; Osmanthus bibracteatus Hayata; Osmanthus ilicifolius (Hassk.) Carrière; Osmanthus integrifolius Hayata; Osmanthus myrtifolius G.Nicholson; Osmanthus rotundifolius (H.Jaeger) Dippel

= Osmanthus heterophyllus =

Species of flowering plant

Osmanthus heterophyllus (Chinese:t 柊樹, s 柊树, p zhōngshù; Japanese: 柊, hiiragi), variously known as holly osmanthus, holly olive, and false holly, is a species of flowering plant in the olive family Oleaceae, native to eastern Asia in central and southern Japan (Honshū, Kyūshū, Shikoku, and the Ryukyu Islands) and Taiwan.

== Description ==
It is an evergreen shrub or small tree growing to 2–8 m (7–26 ft) tall. The bark is brown to grey or blackish, cracking into small plates on old plants. The leaves are opposite, 3–7 cm long and 1.5–4 cm broad with a thick, leathery texture, lustrous dark green above, paler yellow-green below; the margin is entire or with one to four large spine-tipped teeth on each side. Spiny leaves predominate on small, young plants (an adaptation to deter browsing animals), while entire leaves predominate higher on larger mature plants out of the reach of animals. The flowers are very fragrant, white, with a four-lobed corolla, the corolla tube 1–2 mm long and the lobes 2.5–5 mm long; they are dioecious, with flowering in the autumn. The fruit is an ovoid dark purple drupe 1.5 cm long and 1 cm diameter, mature in the following summer about 9 months after flowering.

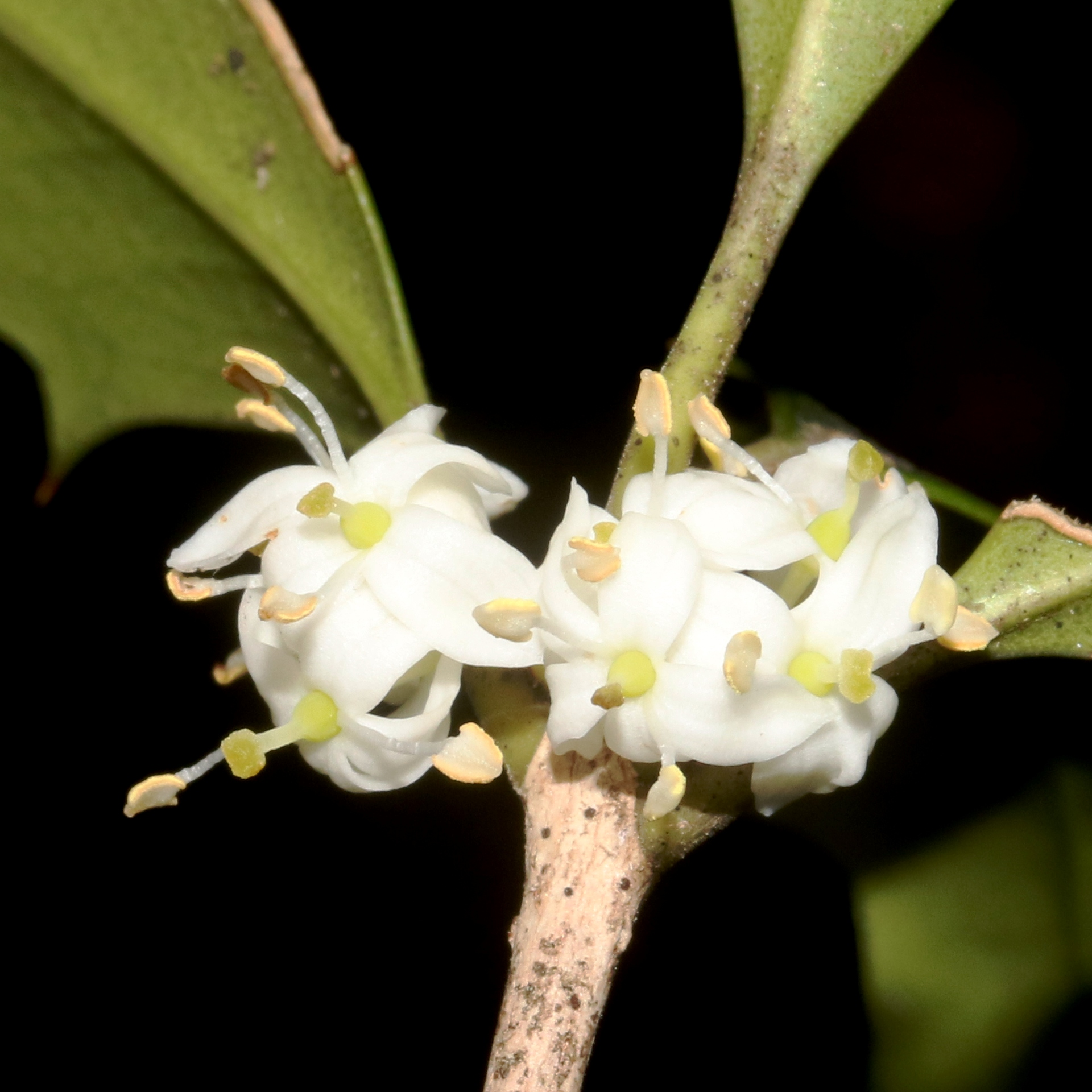
flowers

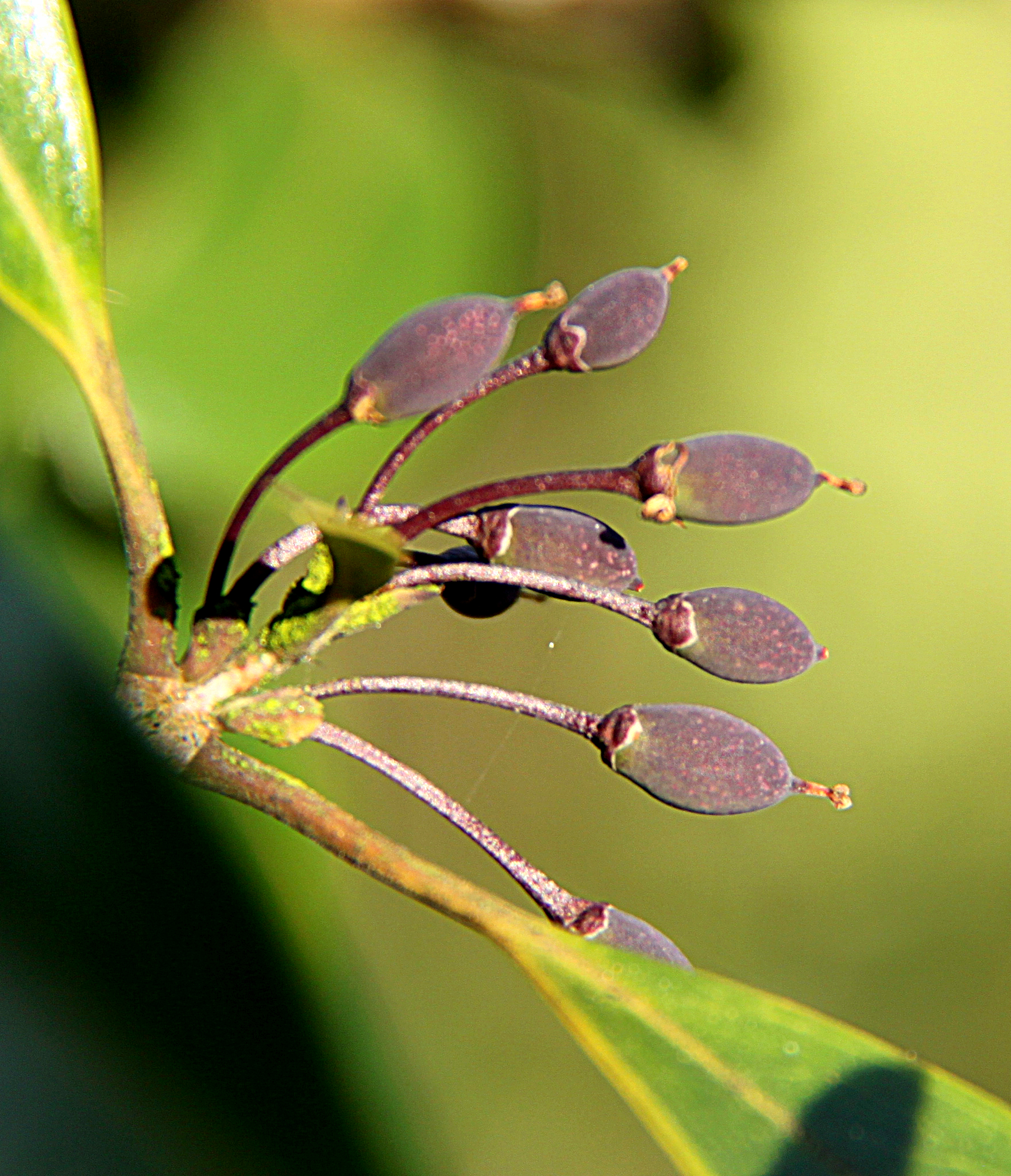
fruits

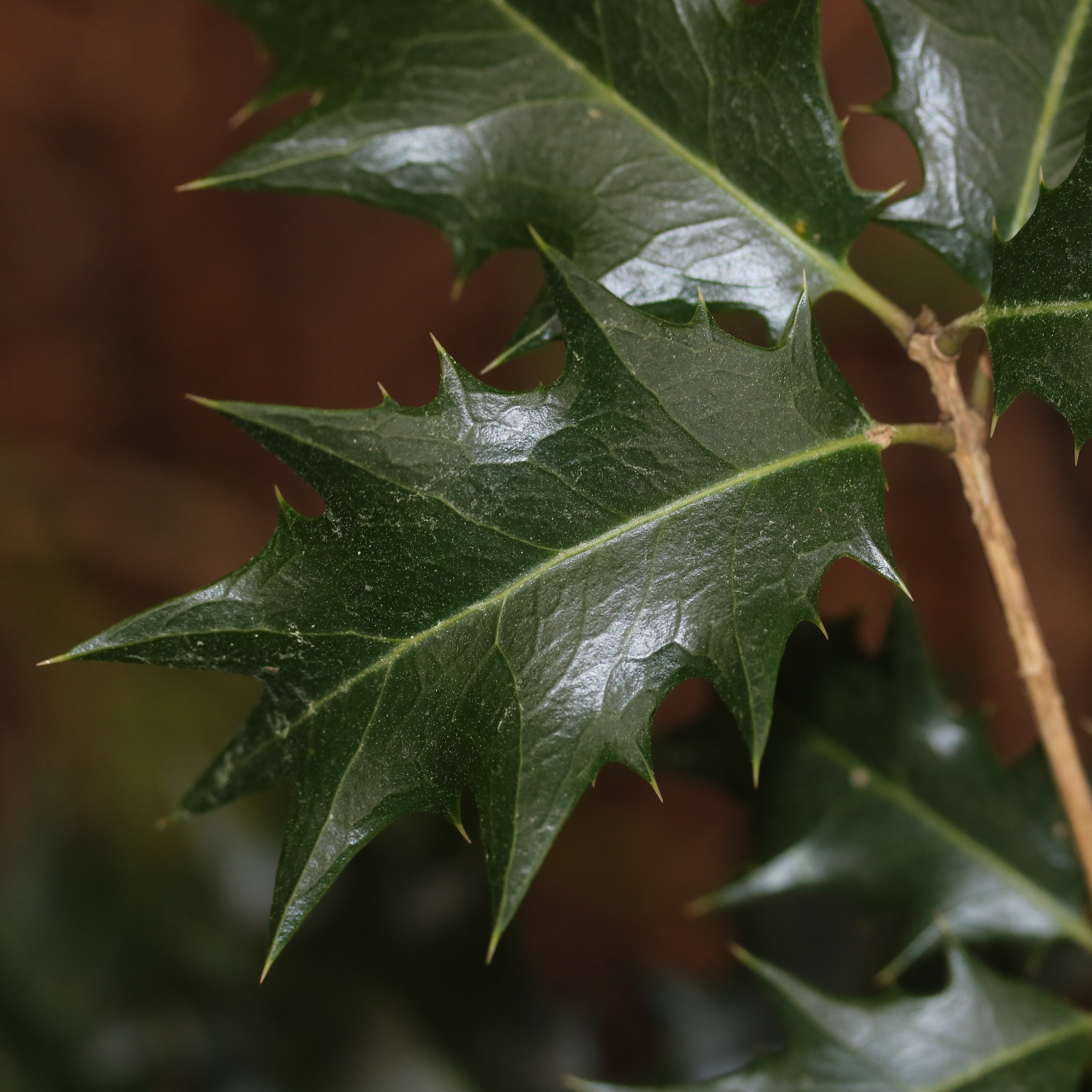
leaf

== Varieties ==
There are two varieties:

- Osmanthus heterophyllus var. heterophyllus. Leaves entire or spiny; flowers with short corolla lobes 2.5-3.5 mm long. Throughout the range of the species.
- Osmanthus heterophyllus var. bibracteatus (Hayata) P.S.Green. Leaves always entire; flowers with long corolla lobes 5 mm long. Endemic to Taiwan.

== Nomenclature ==
Osmanthus is derived from Greek and means 'fragrant flower'.

The scientific name heterophyllus, "different leaves", refers to the variation in leaf shape between spiny and entire. The common name holly osmanthus refers to the similarity in leaf shape to that of the holly (Ilex aquifolium), an example of convergent evolution with a common objective of deterring browsing; the two may be distinguished easily by the leaf arrangement, alternate in Ilex aquifolium and opposite in Osmanthus heterophyllus.

== Cultivation ==
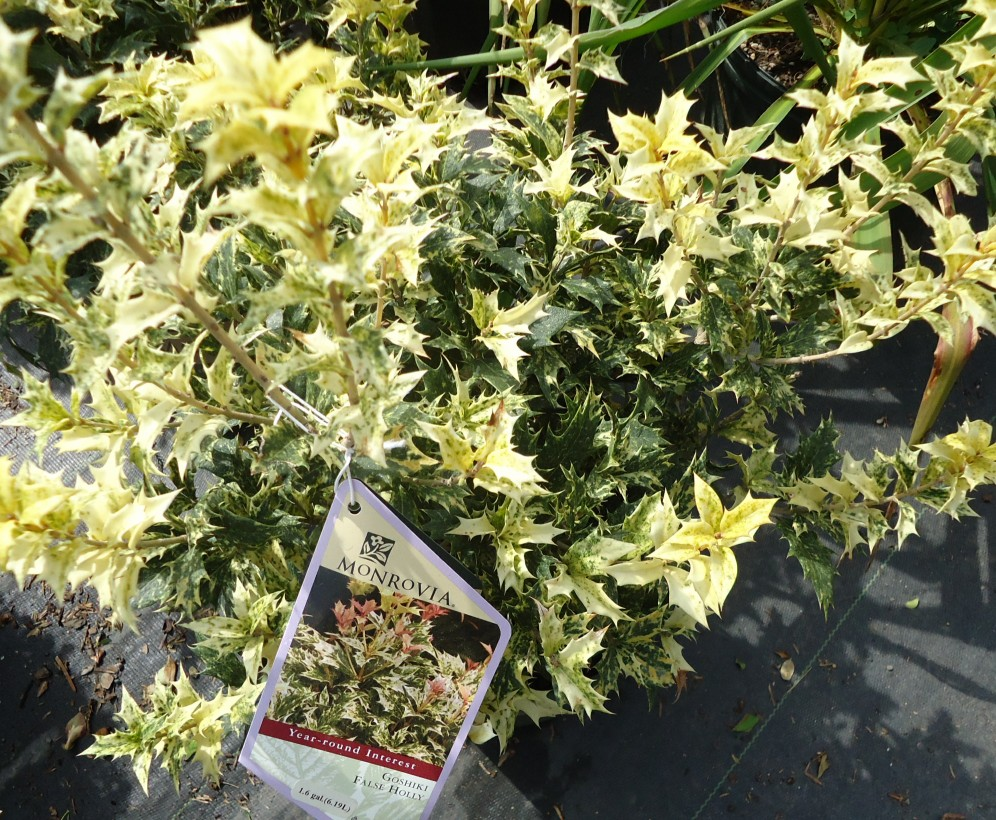
‘Goshiki’, Cranford, New Jersey

It is widely used as a hedge plant. Several cultivars have been selected for garden use, including 'Aureus', 'Goshiki', 'Purpureus', 'Rotundifolius', and 'Subangustatus'. The cultivars 'Goshiki', 'Variegatus' and ‘Purple Shaft’ have gained the Royal Horticultural Society's Award of Garden Merit.

The species has been hybridised in cultivation with Osmanthus fragrans; the resulting hybrid is named Osmanthus × fortunei Carr.

== Historical mentions ==
It is mentioned twice in the Kojiki, the oldest surviving historical record of Japan. The first mention, under the name hihiragi, is in connection with the name of a kami, Hihiragi-no-sono-hana-madzumi-no-kami (translated by Chamberlain as "Deity Waiting-to-see-the-Flowers-of-the-Holly"), with the word madzumi (rarely seen) being used to describe the plant's characteristic of its flowers rarely blossoming, as interpreted by the scholar Tominobu. Its second mention occurs during a passage referring to how a holly wood spear, made of material from the tree and spanning "eight fathoms long", was presented to the Prince Yamato-take by the Emperor prior to him being sent to subdue the East. Its prickly and non-prickly variations are sometimes described as "male" and "female" respectively, though this does not have a relation to the plant's gender.
