= Mount Iide =

Mountain in the country of Japan

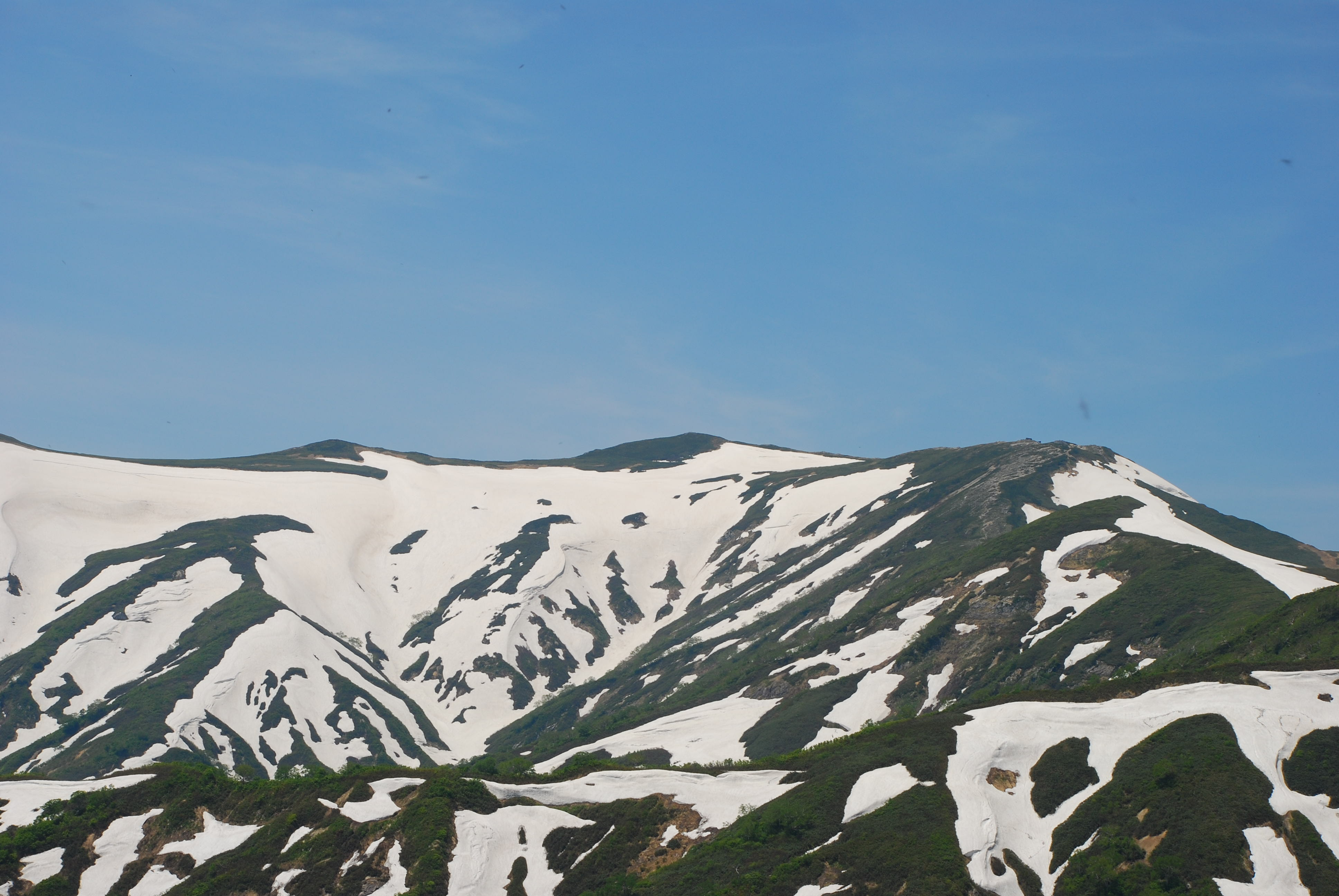
- Mount Iide seen from Iboiwayama

Highest point
- Elevation: 2,105 m (6,906 ft)
- Coordinates: 37°51′17″N 139°42′26″E

Geography
- Location: Fukushima, Tōhoku region, Japan
- Parent range: Iide mountain range

Mount Iide (飯豊山, Iide-san) is the main peak of the Iide mountain range that spans the Fukushima, Niigata and Yamagata prefectures in Japan. On top of the mountain stands the Mount Iide Shrine (飯豊山神社). Mount Iide is, together with the rest of the range, one of the mountains described in Kyūya Fukada's book 100 Famous Japanese Mountains.

Mount Iide is located at 2105 m above sea level but is not the highest peak of the Iide mountain range even though it is the main peak of the range. The highest is Mount Dainichi (大日岳, Dainichi-dake) that is 2128 m high.

The mountain is located on the border between Niigata prefecture and Yamagata prefecture, but the summit itself, Mount Iide Shrine and a path roughly one meter wide leading there, which is known as the Umbilical Cord, belongs to Kitakata, Fukushima. This was a response to complaints when Higashikanbara District was transferred from Fukushima to Niigata during the Meiji period. As a result, Fukushima prefecture has an uneven border, with an arm stretching through the Iide mountain range up to the Mount Iide Shrine.

== See also ==
- List of the 100 famous mountains in Japan
- Mount Hiuchigatake
