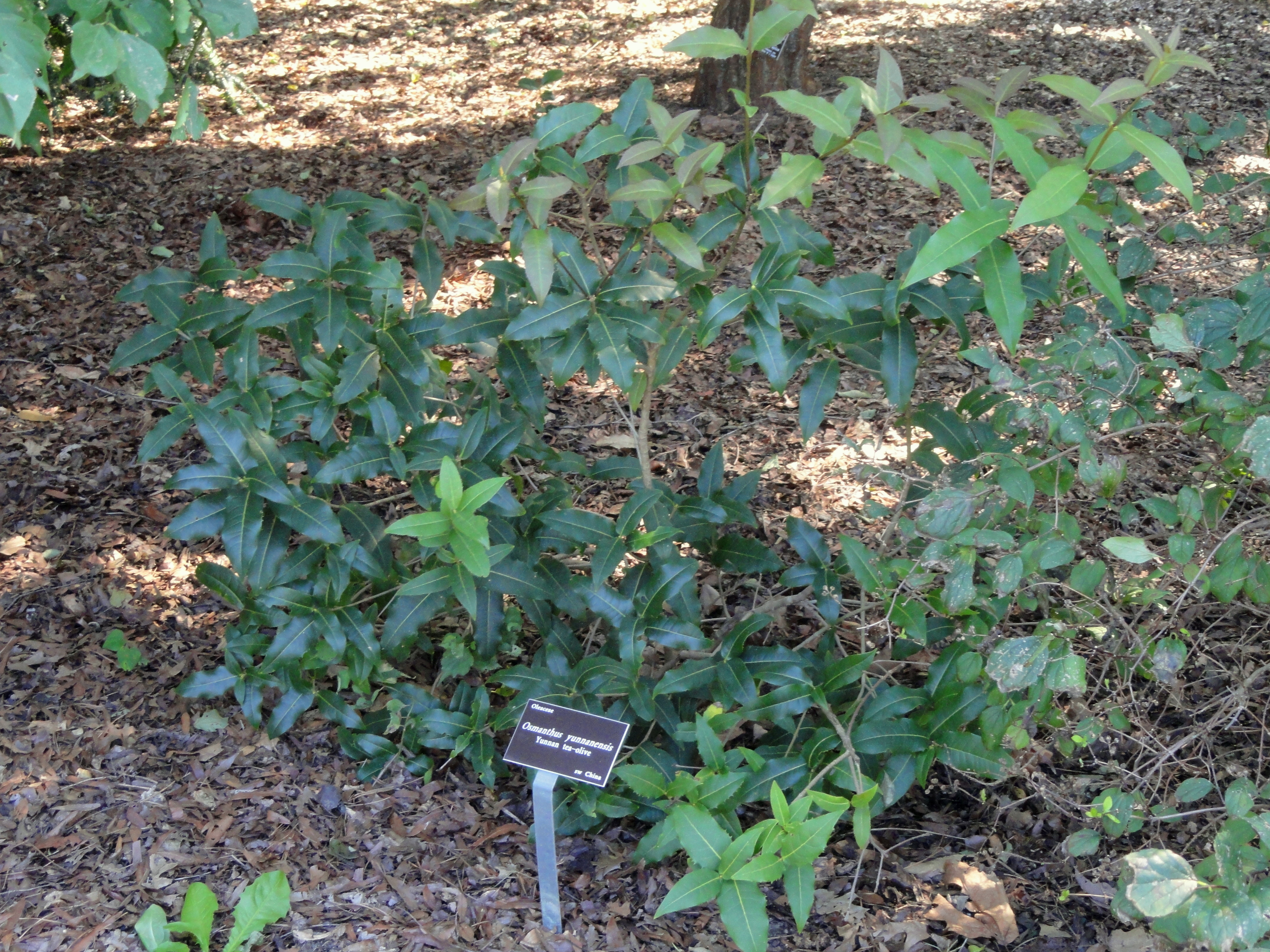
- JC Raulston Arboretum, North Carolina, USA

Scientific classification
- Kingdom: Plantae
- Clade: Tracheophytes
- Clade: Angiosperms
- Clade: Eudicots
- Clade: Asterids
- Order: Lamiales
- Family: Oleaceae
- Genus: Osmanthus
- Species: O. yunnanensis

Binomial name
- Osmanthus yunnanensis (Franch.) P.S.Green Synonyms: Osmanthus bambusifolius; Osmanthus brevipetiolatus; Osmanthus forrestii; Osmanthus liangshanensis; Osmanthus polyneurus; Osmanthus rehderianus; Pittosporum yunnanense

= Osmanthus yunnanensis =

Species of flowering plant

Osmanthus yunnanensis is a species of flowering plant in the olive family Oleaceae, native to Yunnan and Sichuan in the far south west of China. Growing to 12 m (39 ft) tall and broad, it is an evergreen shrub or small tree with leathery oval leaves, which may be flat or undulate. In winter and spring, small clusters of white flowers in the leaf axils produce an intense fragrance.

This plant was introduced to Britain by the Scottish botanist and planthunter George Forrest in 1927. Despite originating in a subtropical region, Osmanthus yunnanensis has proved to be hardy throughout most of the UK, down to about −15 °C (5 °F). There is a thriving specimen in St Andrews Botanic Garden in south east Scotland. It has gained the Royal Horticultural Society's Award of Garden Merit.

== Etymology ==
Osmanthus is derived from Greek and means 'fragrant flower'.

Yunnanensis means 'from Yunnan Province, China.'
