= Chiyoda, Gunma =

Chiyoda 千代田町
- Town
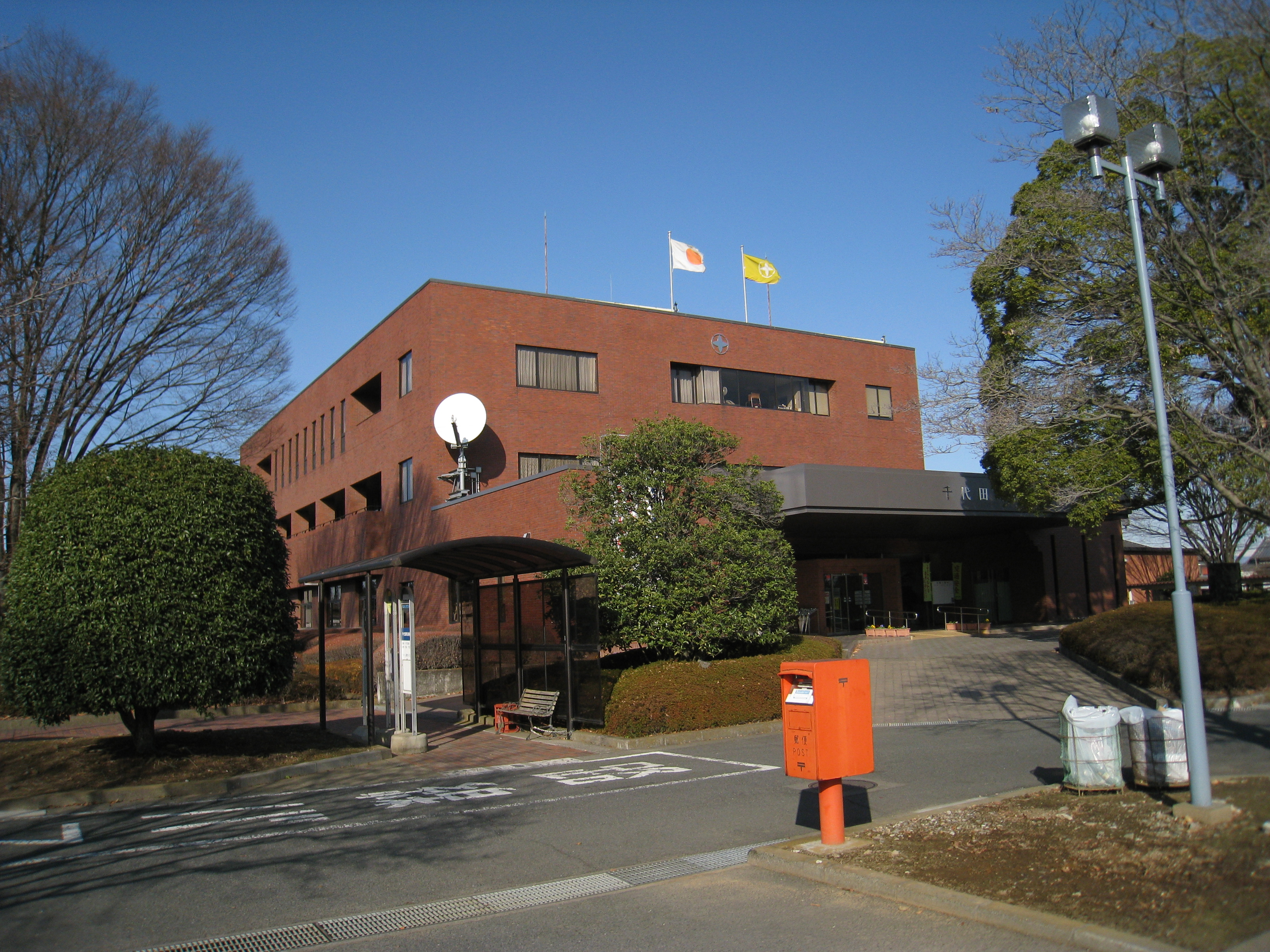
- Chiyoda town hall

- Flag Seal

- Location of Chiyoda in Gunma Prefecture

- Coordinates: 36°13′3.9″N 139°26′32.7″E
- Country: Japan
- Region: Kantō
- Prefecture: Gunma
- District: Ōra

Area
  - Total: 21.73 km^{2} (8.39 sq mi)

Population (September 2020)
  - Total: 11,221
  - Density: 516.4/km^{2} (1,337/sq mi)
- Time zone: UTC+9 (Japan Standard Time)
- Tree: Osmanthus
- Flower: Chrysanthemum
- Phone number: 0276-86-211
- Address: Akaiwa1895, Chiyoda-machi, Gunma-ken 370-0598
- Website: Official website

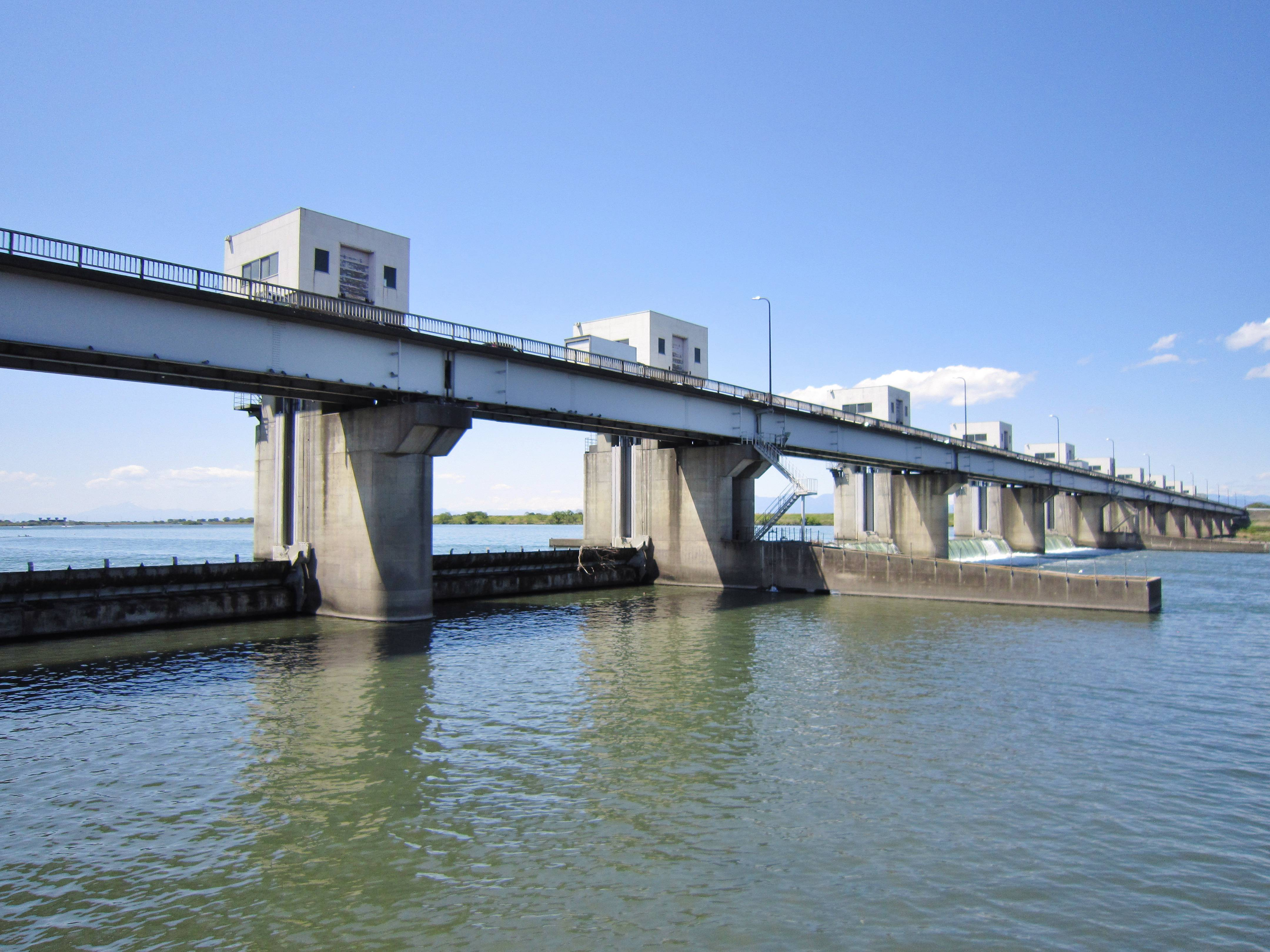
Tone Diversion Weir

Chiyoda (千代田町, Chiyoda-machi) is a town located in Gunma Prefecture, Japan. As of 30 September 2020, the town had an estimated population of 11,221 in 4502 households, and a population density of 520 persons per km^{2}. The total area of the town is 21.73 square kilometres (8.39 sq mi).

== Geography ==
Chiyoda is located in the extreme southern corner Gunma prefecture, bordered by Saitama Prefecture to the south.

=== Surrounding municipalities ===
Gunma Prefecture

- Meiwa
- Oizumi
- Ōra
- Tatebayashi

Saitama Prefecture

- Gyōda
- Hanyū
- Kumagaya

=== Climate ===
Chiyoda has a humid subtropical climate (Köppen Cfa) characterized by hot summers and cold winters. The average annual temperature in Chiyoda is 14.5 °C. The average annual rainfall is 1273 mm with September as the wettest month. The temperatures are highest on average in August, at around 26.8 °C, and lowest in January, at around 3.4 °C.

== Demographics ==
Per Japanese census data, the population of Chiyoda has remained relatively steady over the past 60 years.

Historical population
Year	Pop.	±%
1960	10,192	—
1970	9,620	−5.6%
1980	10,680	+11.0%
1990	11,527	+7.9%
2000	11,602	+0.7%
2010	11,467	−1.2%
2020	10,861	−5.3%

== History ==
The villages of Tominaga, Eiraku, and Nagae were created within Ōra District, Gunma Prefecture on April 1, 1889, with the creation of the modern municipalities system after the Meiji Restoration. The three villages merged on March 31, 1955, to form the village of Chiyoda. However, the former village of Nagae separated out on September 30, 1956, and became part of Nakashima (today Ōra, Gunma). Chiyoda was raised to town status on April 1, 1982.

== Government ==
Chiyoda has a mayor-council form of government with a directly elected mayor and a unicameral town council of 12 members. Chiyoda, together with the other municipalities in Ōra District contributes three members to the Gunma Prefectural Assembly. In terms of national politics, the town is part of Gunma 3rd district of the lower house of the Diet of Japan.

== Economy ==
Agriculture remains a mainstay of the local economy; however, Chiyoda has two industrial parks centered on a beer plant operated by Suntory and a chemical plant operated by Marufuku Chemifa.

== Education ==
Chiyoda has two public elementary schools and one public middle schools operated by the town government. The town does not have a high school.

== Transportation ==
Chiyoda is not served by any railway lines, nor by any national highways.
