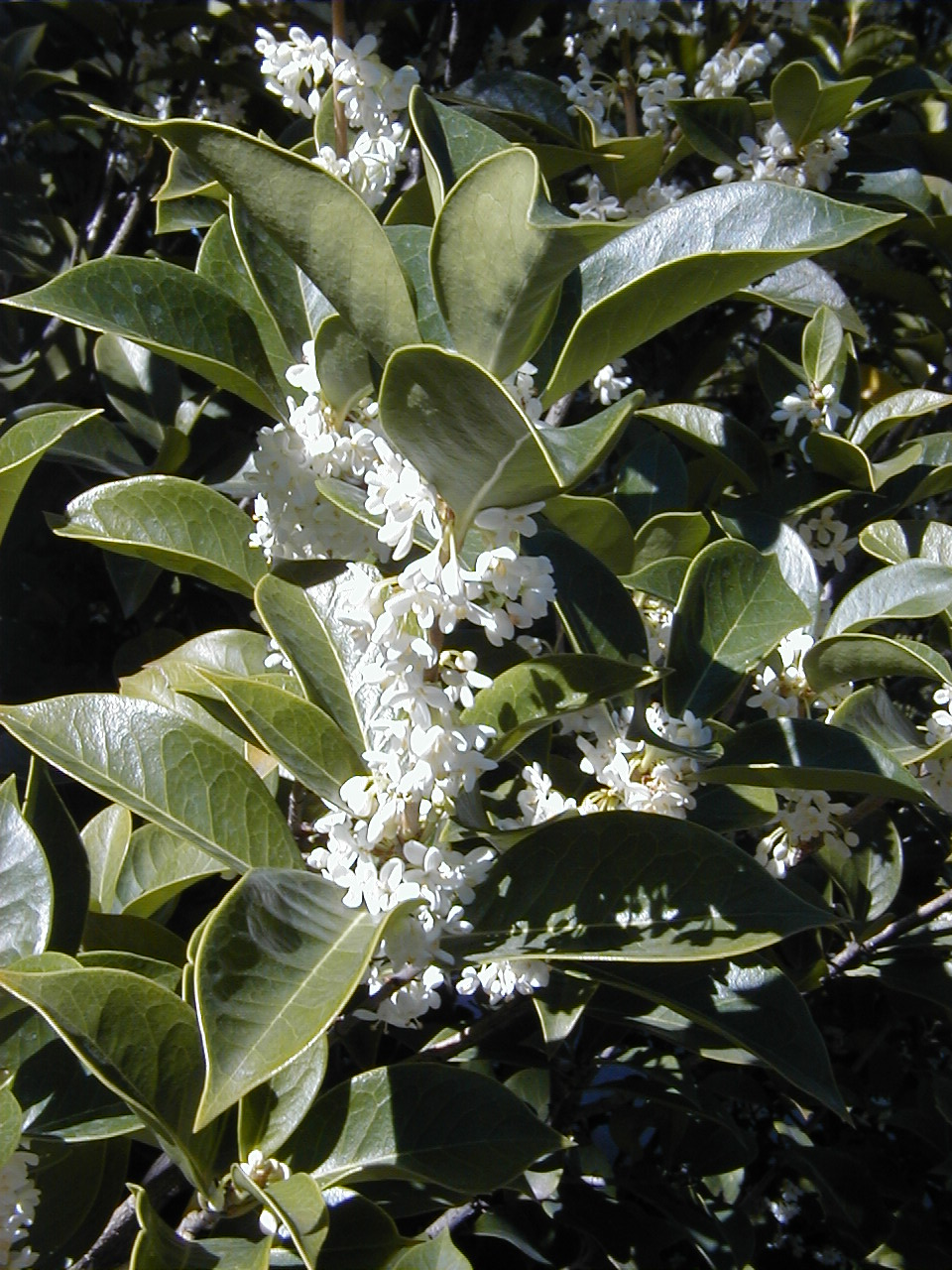

Scientific classification
- Kingdom: Plantae
- Clade: Tracheophytes
- Clade: Angiosperms
- Clade: Eudicots
- Clade: Asterids
- Order: Lamiales
- Family: Oleaceae
- Genus: Osmanthus
- Species: O. armatus

Binomial name
- Osmanthus armatus Diels

= Osmanthus armatus =

Species of flowering plant

Osmanthus armatus, also known by the common name devil wood or Chinese vernacular name 红柄木犀 (Hóng bǐng mùxī) is a species in the genus Osmanthus in the family Oleaceae. It is native to China, specifically the west or central and southeast.

The species was introduced into the UK via Veitch Nurseries in 1902 by Wilson, who collected it during one of his trips to China.

== Description ==
A woody evergreen which ranges in size from a shrub to a small tree, reaching 8–15 feet high at maturity.

Though the young leaves are conspicuously spiny, spines are often entirely absent from the mature, adult leaves.

White blooms appear in axillary clusters in autumn.

== Etymology ==
Osmanthus is derived from Greek and means 'fragrant flower'.

Armatus means 'armed' or 'thorny'.
