= Itakura, Gunma =

Itakura 板倉町
- Town
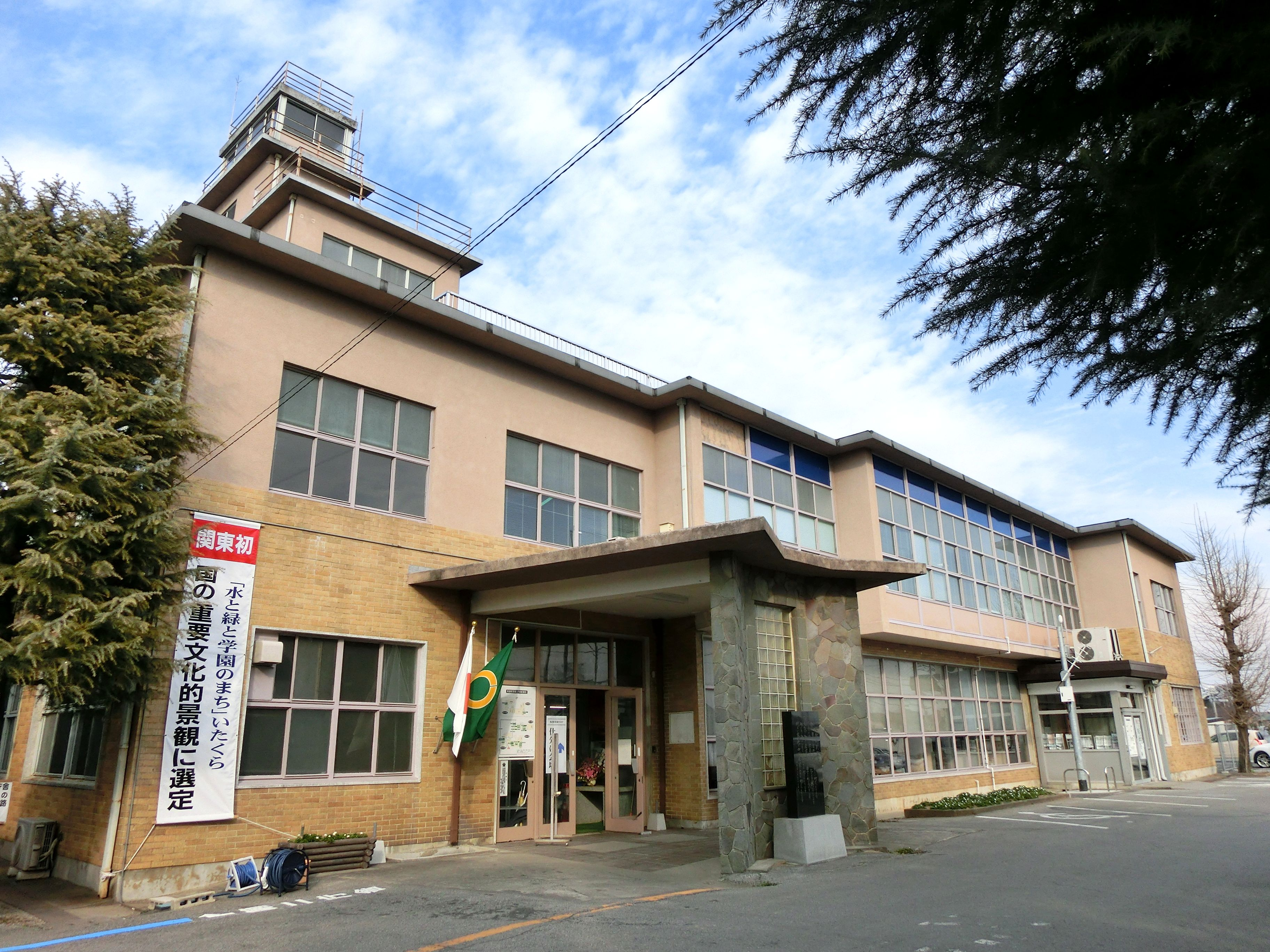
- Itakura town hall

- Flag Emblem

- Location of Itakura in Gunma Prefecture

- Coordinates: 36°13′22.6″N 139°36′37.1″E
- Country: Japan
- Region: Kantō
- Prefecture: Gunma
- District: Ōra

Area
  - Total: 41.86 km^{2} (16.16 sq mi)

Population (September 2020)
  - Total: 14,323
  - Density: 342.2/km^{2} (886.2/sq mi)
- Time zone: UTC+9 (Japan Standard Time)
- Tree: Osmanthus
- Flower: Sakura
- Bird: Skylark
- Phone number: 0276-82-1111
- Address: 2067 Itakura, Itakura-machi, Gunma-ken 374-0132
- Website: Official website

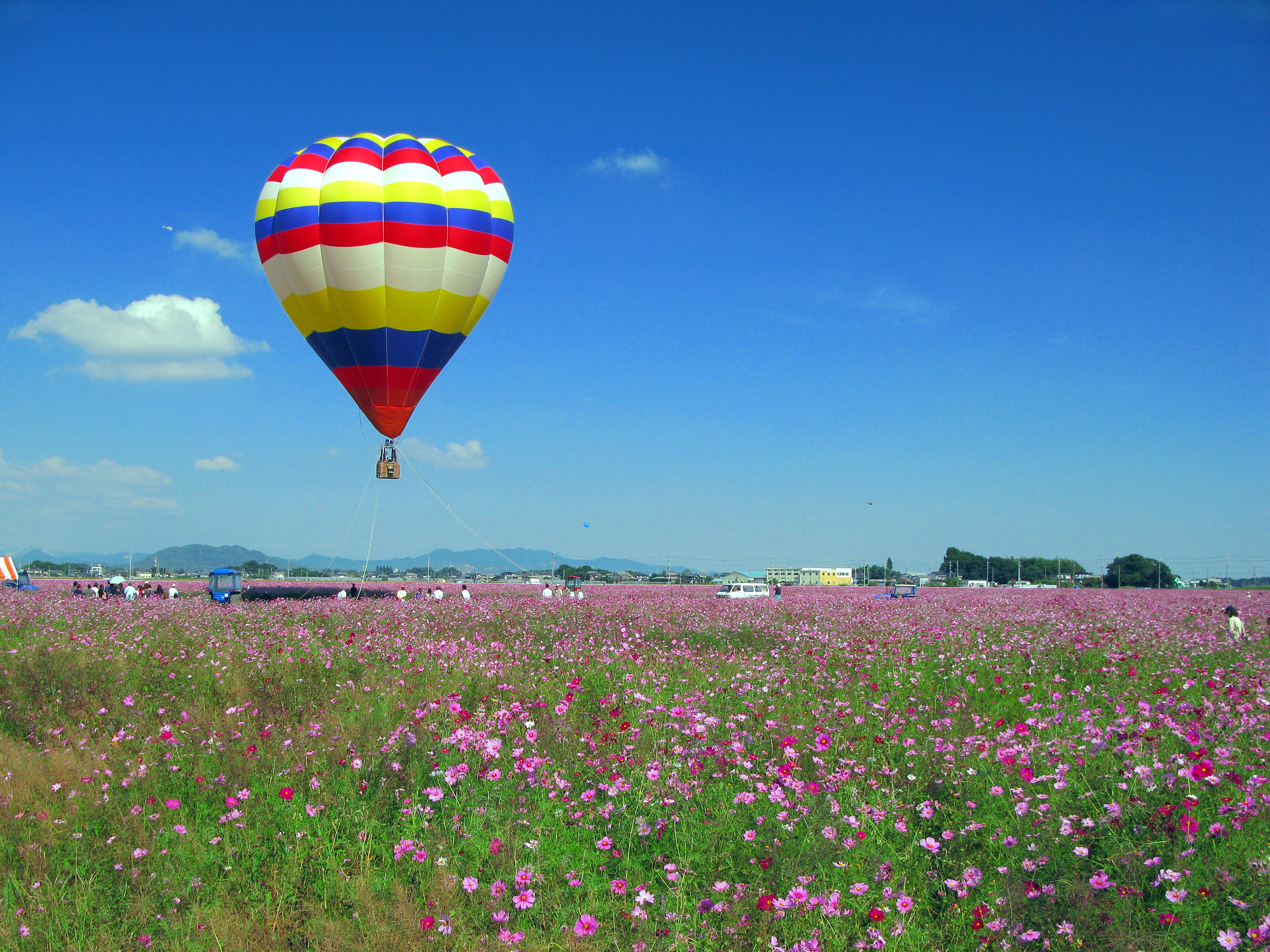
Itakura Cosmos Festival

Itakura (板倉町, Itakura-machi) is a town located in Gunma Prefecture, Japan. As of 1 September 2020, the town had an estimated population of 14,323 in 5717 households and a population density of 340 persons per km^{2}. The total area of the town is 41.86 square kilometres (16.16 sq mi). Itakura's animal mascot is the catfish. It is represented in a bronze statue at Raiden Shrine, as a mikoshi in Itakura's summer festival, and also is emblazoned on the town's manhole covers. Itakura is one of the few places in Japan where catfish dishes are a local delicacy.

== Geography ==
Itakura is located in the northern Kantō Plains in the extreme southern corner of Gunma prefecture, bordered by Saitama Prefecture to the south and Tochigi Prefecture to the north. The Tone River flows through the town, and the Watarase River forms its northern border.

=== Surrounding municipalities ===
Gunma Prefecture

- Meiwa
- Tatebayashi

Saitama Prefecture

- Hanyu
- Kazo

Tochigi Prefecture

- Sano
- Tochigi

=== Climate ===
Itakura has a humid subtropical climate (Köppen Cfa) characterized by hot summers and cold winters. The average annual temperature in Itakura is 14.3 °C. The average annual rainfall is 1303 mm with September as the wettest month. The temperatures are highest on average in August, at around 26.6 °C, and lowest in January, at around 3.3 °C.

== Demographics ==
Per Japanese census data, the population of Itakura has declined over the past 70 years.

Historical population
Year	Pop.	±%
1920	15,199	—
1930	16,126	+6.1%
1940	16,162	+0.2%
1950	20,048	+24.0%
1960	18,189	−9.3%
1970	16,290	−10.4%
1980	16,024	−1.6%
1990	15,948	−0.5%
2000	15,946	−0.0%
2010	15,710	−1.5%
2020	14,083	−10.4%

== History ==
The villages of Nishiyada, Ebise, Ōgano and Inara were created within Ōra District, Gunma Prefecture on April 1, 1889, with the creation of the modern municipalities system after the Meiji Restoration. On February 1, 1955, the four villages merged to form the town of Itakura. Meiwa was raised to town status on October 1, 1998.

== Government ==
Itakura has a mayor-council form of government with a directly elected mayor and a unicameral town council of 12 members. Itakura, together with the other municipalities in Ōra District contributes three members to the Gunma Prefectural Assembly. In terms of national politics, the town is part of Gunma 3rd district of the lower house of the Diet of Japan.

== Economy ==
Itakura is largely a bedroom community for Tokyo and nearly Tatebayashi. About 55% of the town's area is farmland, and Itakura's main agricultural products include rice and cucumbers, though many other crops are grown locally.

== Education ==
Itakura has two public elementary schools and one public middle schools operated by the town government, and one public high school operated by the Gunma prefecture Board of Education. Toyo University has a branch campus in Itakura.

== Transportation ==
=== Railway ===
Tōbu Railway – Tōbu Nikkō Line

- Itakura Tōyōdai-mae

=== Highway ===
- National Route 122

== Local attractions ==
- Gunma's Waterways
- Itakura Golf Course
- Raiden Jinja
- Takatori Tenmangū
- Watarase-yusuichi, a UNESCO designated Ramsar Site
- Tochigi–Gunma–Saitama border
