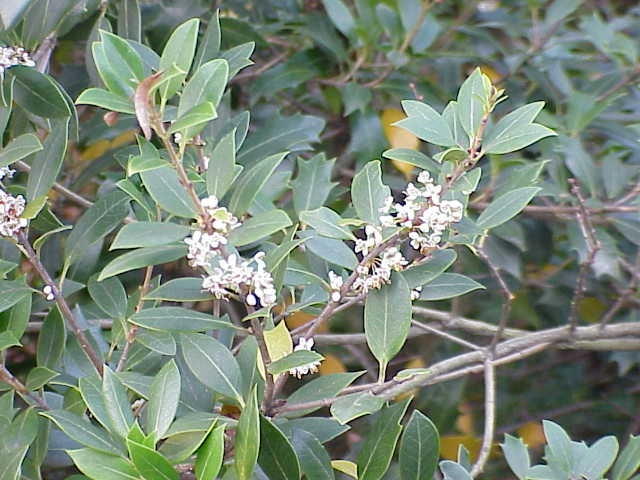
- Osmanthus heterophyllus in flower

Scientific classification
- Kingdom: Plantae
- Clade: Tracheophytes
- Clade: Angiosperms
- Clade: Eudicots
- Clade: Asterids
- Order: Lamiales
- Family: Oleaceae
- Tribe: Oleeae
- Subtribe: Oleinae
- Genus: Osmanthus; Lour.

Synonyms
- Pausia Raf.; Siphonosmanthus Stapf

= Osmanthus =

Genus of flowering plant

Osmanthus /ɒzˈmænθəs/ is a genus of about 30 species of flowering plants in the family Oleaceae. Most of the species are native to eastern Asia (China, Japan, Korea, Southeast Asia, the Himalayas, etc.) with a few species from the Caucasus, New Caledonia, and Sumatra. Osmanthus has been known in China since ancient times with the earliest writings coming from the Warring States period; the book Shanhai Jing: Nanshan Jing (Classic of Mountains and Seas: Classic of the Southern Mountains) states: "The first peak of the Que Mountain range is Mount Zhaoyao, rising by the western sea, where many osmanthus trees grow, and where rich veins of metals and jade lie hidden."

== Description ==
Osmanthus range in size from shrubs to medium-sized trees, 2–12 m (7–39 ft) tall. The leaves are opposite, evergreen, and simple, with an entire, serrated or coarsely toothed margin. The flowers are produced in spring, summer or autumn, each flower being about 1 cm long, white, with a four-lobed tubular-based corolla ('petals'). The flowers grow in small panicles, and in several species have a strong fragrance. The fruit is a small (10–15 mm), hard-skinned dark blue to purple drupe containing a single seed.

== Etymology ==
The generic name Osmanthus is composed of two parts: the Greek words osma meaning smell or fragrance, and anthos meaning flower.

== Species ==
26 species are accepted.

- Osmanthus armatus Diels – Shaanxi, Sichuan, Hubei, Hunan
- Osmanthus attenuatus P.S.Green – Guangxi, Guizhou, Yunnan
- Osmanthus austrozhejiangensis Z.H.Chen, W.Y.Xie & Xi Liu – Zhejiang
- Osmanthus cooperi Hemsl. – Anhui, Fujian, Jiangsu, Jiangxi, Zhejiang
- Osmanthus decorus (Boiss. & Balansa) Kasapligil – Caucasian osmanthus – Turkey, Caucasus
- Osmanthus delavayi Franch. – Guizhou, Sichuan, Yunnan
- Osmanthus didymopetalus P.S.Green – Guangdong, Hainan
- Osmanthus enervius Masam. & T.Mori – Taiwan, Nansei Islands
- Osmanthus fordii Hemsl. – Guangdong, Guangxi
- Osmanthus fragrans Lour. – Sweet osmanthus, sweet olive, fragrant tea olive – Himalayas (northern and eastern India, Nepal, Bhutan, Assam), Indochina (Myanmar, Thailand, Cambodia, Vietnam), Japan, China (Guizhou, Sichuan, Yunnan), Taiwan
- Osmanthus gracilinervis L.C.Chia ex R.L.Lu – Guangdong, Guangxi, Hunan, Jiangxi, Zhejiang
- Osmanthus hainanensis P.S.Green – Hainan
- Osmanthus henryi P.S.Green – Guizhou, Hunan, Yunnan
- Osmanthus heterophyllus (G.Don) P.S.Green – Holly osmanthus, holly olive, false holly, mock holly, hiiragi – Japan, Taiwan, Nansei Islands
- Osmanthus insularis Koidz. – Korea, Japan, Nansei Islands, Ogasawara Islands,
- Osmanthus iriomotensis T.Yamaz – Nansei Islands
- Osmanthus kaoi (T.S.Liu & J.C.Liao) S.Y.Lu – Taiwan
- Osmanthus lanceolatus Hayata – Taiwan
- Osmanthus pubipedicellatus L.C.Chia ex H.T.Chang – Guangdong
- Osmanthus reticulatus P.S.Green – Guangdong, Guangxi, Guizhou, Hunan, Sichuan
- Osmanthus rigidus Nakai – Kyushu
- Osmanthus serrulatus Rehder in C.S.Sargent – Sichuan
- Osmanthus suavis King ex C.B.Clarke in J.D.Hooker – Assam, Bhutan, Nepal, Sikkim, Myanmar, Yunnan, Tibet
- Osmanthus urceolatus P.S.Green - Sichuan, Hubei
- Osmanthus venosus Pamp. – Hubei
- Osmanthus yunnanensis (Franch.) P.S.Green – Yunnan, Tibet

=== Garden hybrids ===
- Osmanthus × burkwoodii (Burkwood & Skipwith) P.S.Green (O. delavayi × O. decorus)
- Osmanthus × fortunei Carrière (O. fragrans × O. heterophyllus)

=== Formerly placed here ===
Species formerly in Osmanthus are now placed in other genera including Cartrema, Chengiodendron, and Notelaea.

- Cartrema americana (L.) G.L.Nesom (as O. americanus (L.) A.Gray) – Devilwood – southeastern US from Texas to Virginia; eastern and southern Mexico
- Cartrema floridana (Chapm.) G.L.Nesom (as O. floridanus Chapm.) - Florida
- Cartrema scortechinii (King & Gamble) de Juana (as O. scortechinii King & Gamble) – Thailand, Sumatra, Peninsular Malaysia
- Cartrema sumatrana (P.S.Green) de Juana (as O. sumatranus P.S.Green) – Sumatra
- Chengiodendron marginatum (Champ. ex Benth.) C.B.Shang, X.R.Wang, Yi F.Duan & Yong F.Li (as O. marginatus (Champ. ex Benth.) Hemsl.) – Nansei Islands, Taiwan, Vietnam, Anhui, Fujian, Guangdong, Guangxi, Guizhou, Hainan, Hunan, Jiangxi, Sichuan, Yunnan, Zhejiang
- Chengiodendron matsumuranum (Hayata) C.B.Shang, X.R.Wang, Yi F.Duan & Yong F.Li (as O. matsumuranus Hayata) – Assam, Thailand, Laos, Cambodia, Vietnam, Anhui, Guangdong, Guangxi, Guizhou, Jiangxi, Taiwan, Yunnan, Zhejiang
- Chengiodendron minor (P.S.Green) C.B.Shang, X.R.Wang, Yi F.Duan & Yong F.Li (as O. minor P.S.Green) – Fujian, Guangdong, Guangxi, Jiangxi, Zhejiang
- Notelaea austrocaledonica Vieill. (as O. austrocaledonicus (Vieill.) Knobl.) – New Caledonia
- Notelaea cymosa Guillaumin (as O. cymosus (Guillaumin) P.S.Green) – New Caledonia
- Notelaea monticola Schltr. (as O. monticola (Schltr.) Knobl.) – New Caledonia

== Cultivation ==
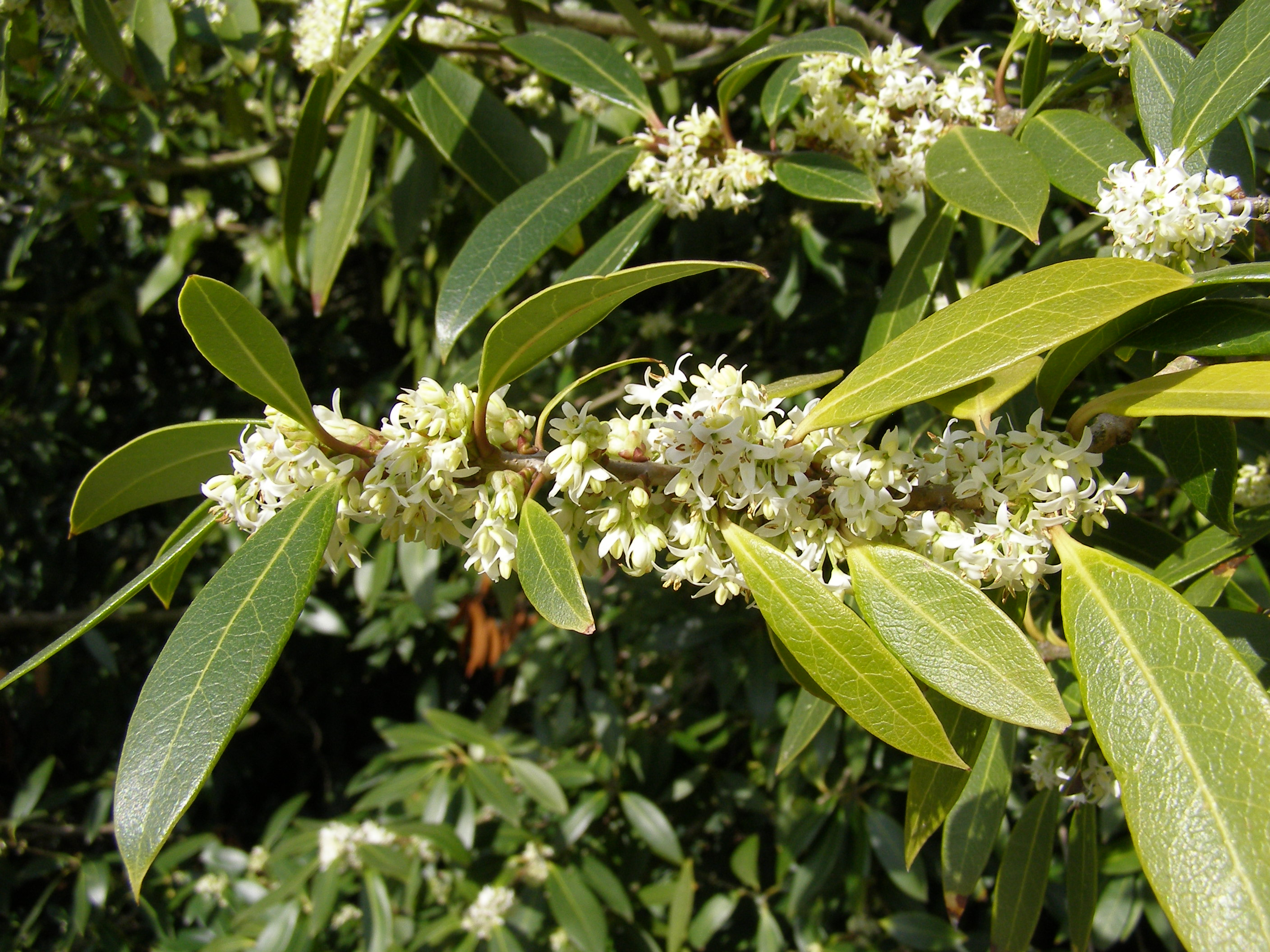
Osmanthus decorus

Osmanthus are popular shrubs in parks and gardens throughout the warm temperate zone. Several hybrids and cultivars have been developed. Osmanthus flower on old wood and produce more flowers if unpruned. A pruned shrub often produces few or no flowers for one to five or more years, before the new growth matures sufficiently to start flowering.

In Japan, Osmanthus fragrans var. aurantiacus Makino (fragrant orange-colored olive) (kin-mokusei) is a favorite garden shrub. Its small deep golden flowers appear in short-stalked clusters in late autumn. It has an intense sweet fragrance. A variant with white flowers (gin-mokusei) is also popular.

== Uses ==
The flowers of O. fragrans are used throughout East Asia for their scent and flavour, which is likened to apricot and peach.

In China, osmanthus tea combines sweet osmanthus flowers with black or green tea leaves. In Liuzhou, it is used to flavor a locally brewed beer. Sweet osmanthus and osmanthus tea are particularly associated with the city of Guilin whose name translates to "Forest of Sweet Osmanthus".

Chinese osmanthus dishes also include a steamed bread made from blended rice and wheat flour and chestnuts boiled with dried osmanthus flowers.

Osmanthus wine is prepared by infusing whole Osmanthus fragrans flowers in huangjiu or other types of rice wine and is traditionally consumed during the Mid-Autumn Festival.

PepsiCo manufactures osmanthus flavored Pepsi for the Chinese domestic market. Similarly, the White Rabbit candy company also manufactures Osmanthus flavoured White Rabbit milk candies which cater to Hong Kong and the Chinese domestic market.
