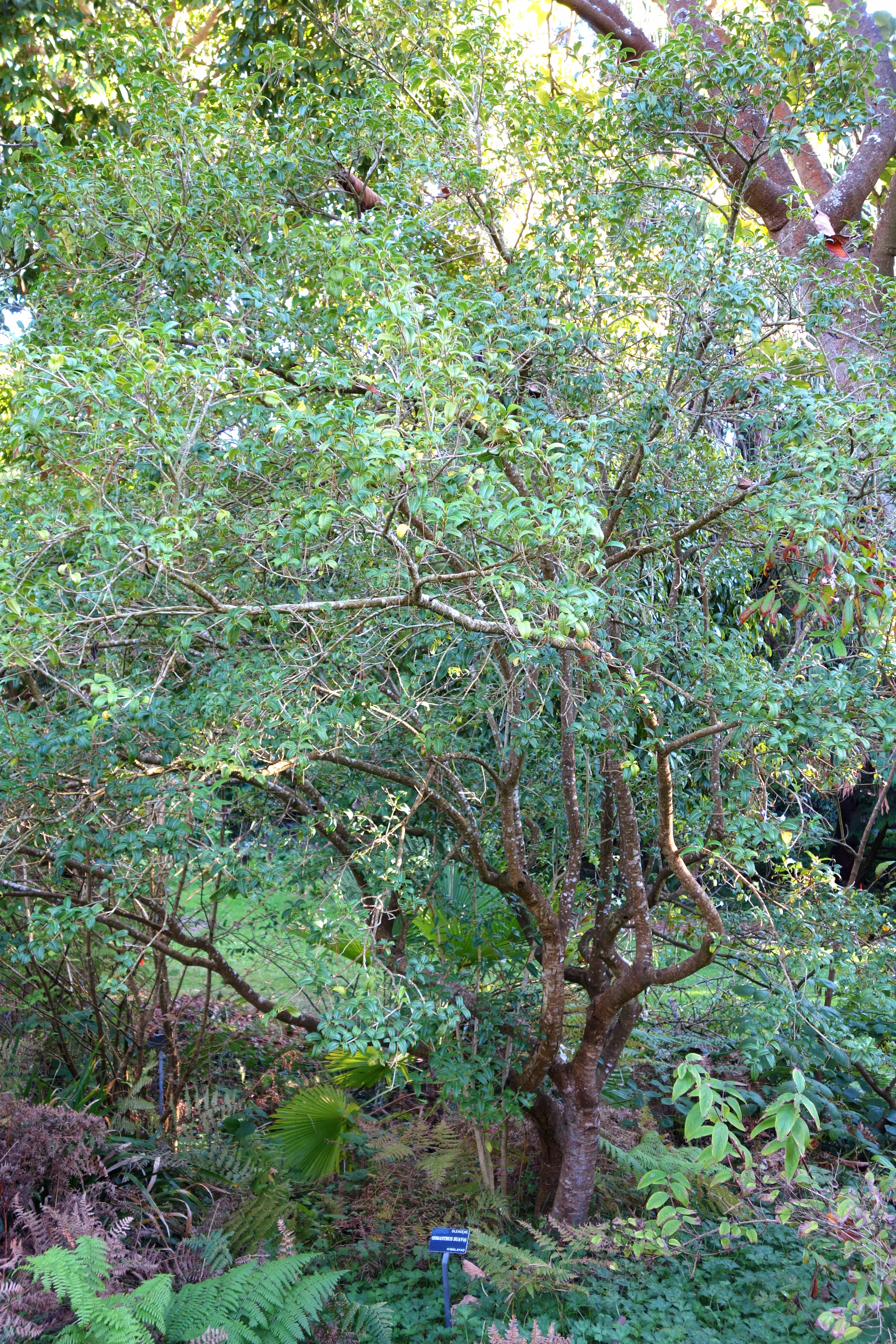
- At the San Francisco Botanical Garden

Scientific classification
- Kingdom: Plantae
- Clade: Embryophytes
- Clade: Tracheophytes
- Clade: Spermatophytes
- Clade: Angiosperms
- Clade: Eudicots
- Clade: Asterids
- Order: Lamiales
- Family: Oleaceae
- Genus: Osmanthus
- Species: O. suavis

Binomial name
- Osmanthus suavis King ex C.B.Clarke

Synonyms
- Siphonosmanthus suavis (King ex C.B.Clarke) Stapf

= Osmanthus suavis =

Species of flowering plant

Osmanthus suavis, the sweet olive or sweet osmanthus, is a species of flowering plant in the family Oleaceae, native to the slopes of the Eastern Himalayas. An evergreen shrub typically 6–12 ft (2–4 m) tall, and hardy in USDA zones 8 and 9, it is prized for its floral fragrance and is recommended for hedges. Its leaves are dark green and lanceolate to oblong in shape. It grows in dense forests and thickets on slopes.
