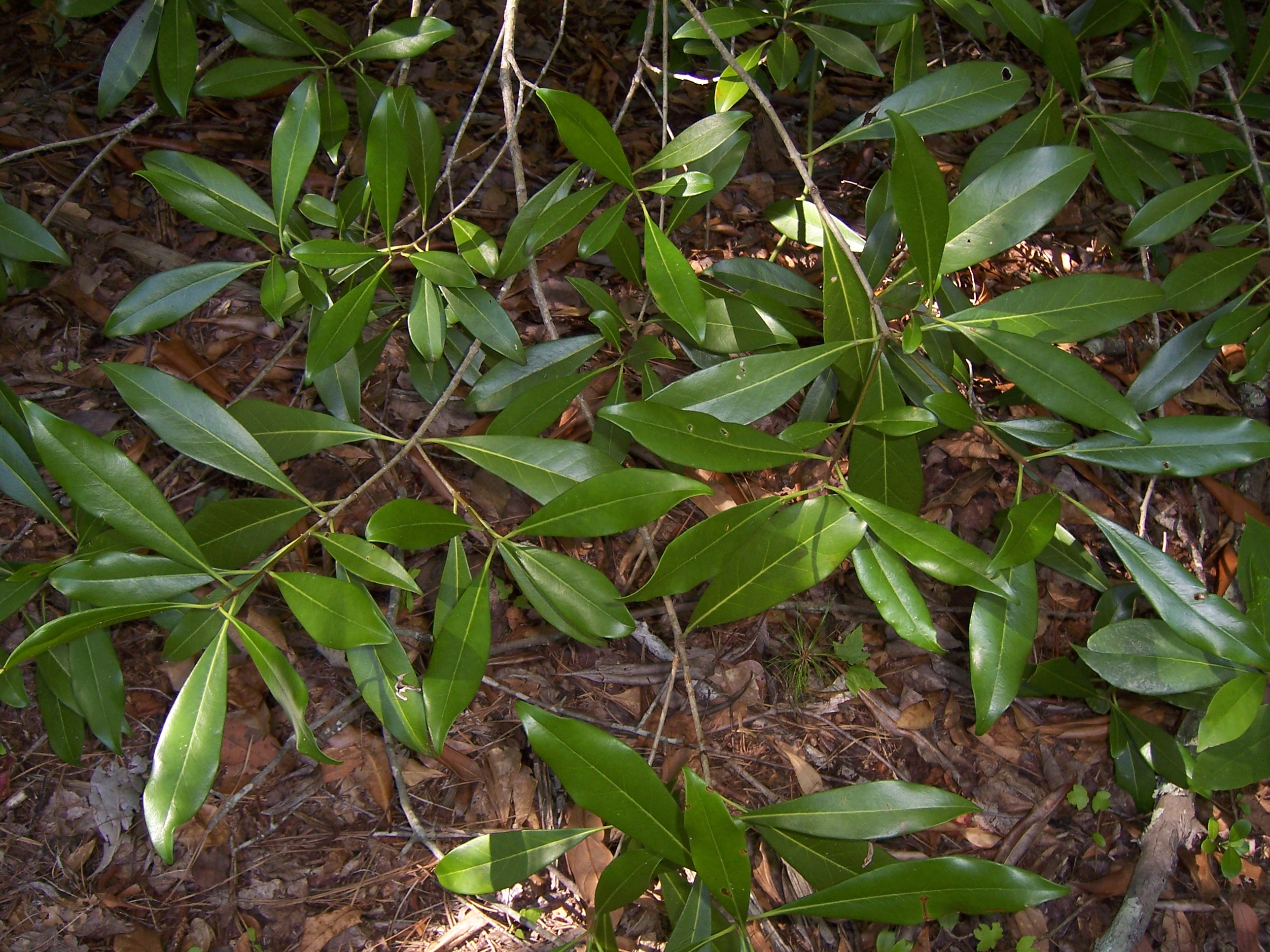
- Leaves

Conservation status
- Least Concern (IUCN 3.1)

- Secure (NatureServe)

Scientific classification
- Kingdom: Plantae
- Clade: Tracheophytes
- Clade: Angiosperms
- Clade: Eudicots
- Clade: Asterids
- Order: Lamiales
- Family: Oleaceae
- Genus: Cartrema
- Species: C. americanus

Binomial name
- Cartrema americanus (L.) G.L.Nesom
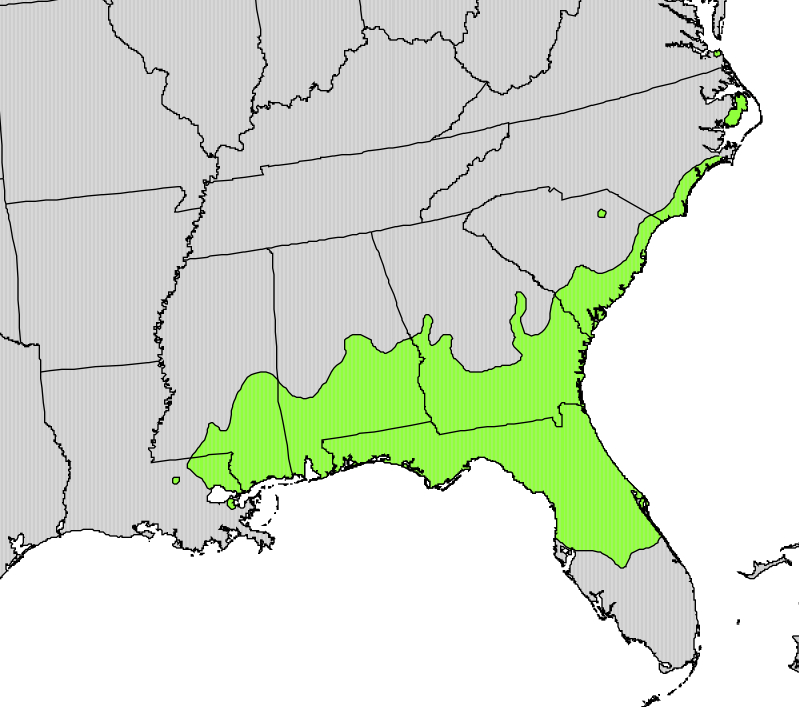
- US range

Synonyms
- Amarolea americana (L.) Small; Cartrema odorata Raf.; Olea americana L.; Olea laeta Salisb.; Osmanthus americanus (L.) A.Gray; Osmanthus americanus var. microphyllus P.S.Green; Osmanthus mexicanus Lundell; Pausia americana (L.) Raf.; Pausia odorata Raf.

= Cartrema americana =

American olive

Species of shrub

Cartrema americana, commonly called American olive, wild olive, or devilwood, is an evergreen shrub or small tree native to southeastern North America, in the United States from Virginia to Texas, and in Mexico from Nuevo León south to Oaxaca and Veracruz.

Cartrema americana was formerly classified as Osmanthus americanus. Following the discovery that Osmanthus was polyphyletic, it was transferred to the segregate genus Cartrema together with Osmanthus floridanus and five Asian species.

Cartrema americana grows to 4–7 m (13–23 ft), rarely to 11 m (36 ft) tall. The leaves are 5–14 cm (2.0–5.5 in) long and 2–4 cm (0.79–1.57 in) broad, with an entire margin. Its flowers, produced in early spring, are small (1 cm long), white, with a four-lobed corolla and have a strong fragrance. The fruit is a globose dark blue drupe 6–15 mm (0.24–0.59 in) diameter, containing a single seed.

It is cultivated as an ornamental plant in gardens for its fragrant flowers.
