= Iide Mountains =

Mountain range in the country of Japan

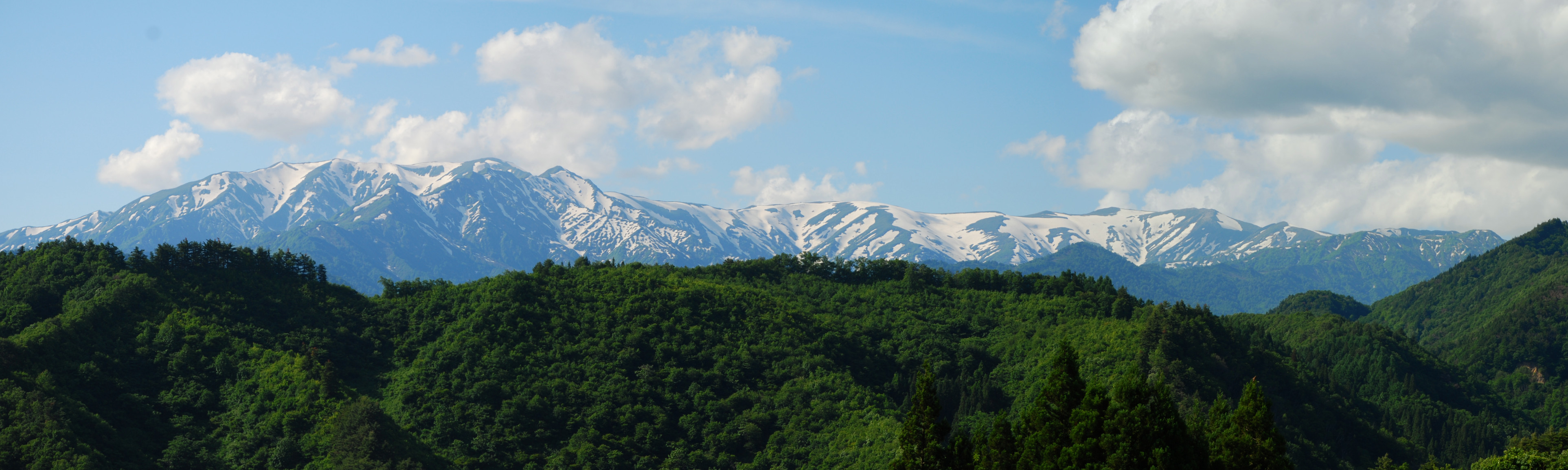
- Iide Mountain Range seen from Aizu, Fukushima

Highest point
- Peak: Mount Dainichi, Kiso District
- Elevation: 2,128 m (6,982 ft)
- Coordinates: 37°49′59″N 139°39′38″E

Naming
- Native name: 飯豊連峰 (Japanese)

Geography
- Country: Japan
- Prefectures: Niigata, Yamagata and Fukushima

The Iide Mountains (飯豊連峰, Iide-renpō) or Iide Mountain district (飯豊山地, Iide-sanchi) is a mountain range that spans the Fukushima, Niigata and Yamagata prefectures in Japan. Its highest peak is Mount Dainichi (大日岳, Dainichi-dake) at 2,128m, and the main peak of the range is Mount Iide at 2,105m above sea level. The range contains a number of peaks higher than 2000m and is a part of the Bandai-Asahi National Park.

== Peaks ==
Below are some of the peaks of the Iide Mountains:

- Mt. Dainichi (大日岳, Dainichi-dake) (2,128m)
- Mt. Iide (飯豊山, Iide-san) (2,105m)
- Mt. Kitamata (北股岳, Kitamata-dake) (2,024m)
- Mt. Eboshi (烏帽子岳, Eboshi-dake) (2,017m)
- Mt. Onishi (御西岳, Onishi-dake) (2,012m)
- Mt. Tanemaki (種蒔山, Tanemaki-yama) (1,791m)
- Mt. Mikuni (三国岳, Mikuni-dake) (1,664m)
