= Meiwa, Gunma =

Meiwa 明和町
- Town
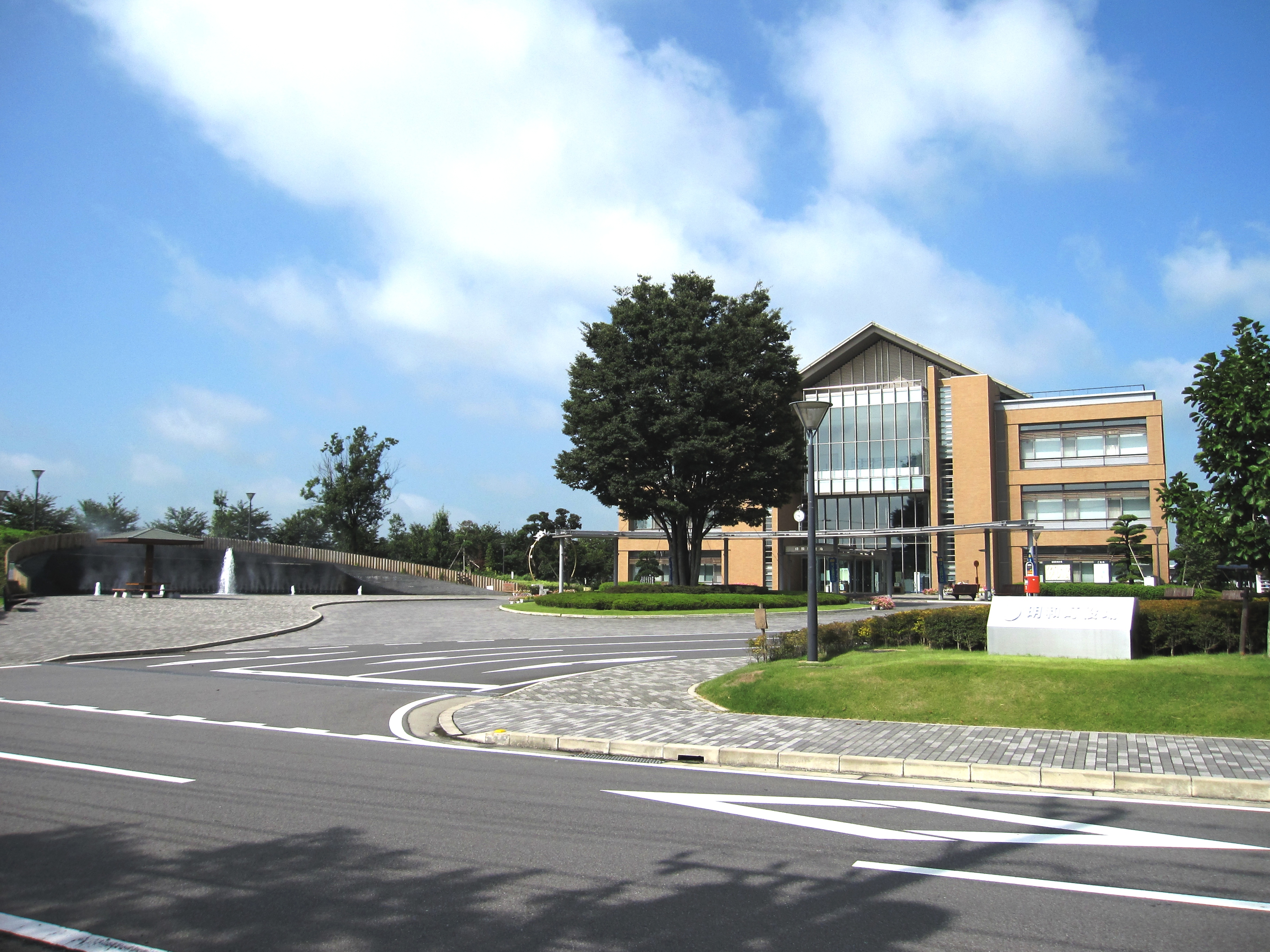
- Meiwa town hall

- Flag Seal

- Location of Meiwa in Gunma Prefecture

- Coordinates: 36°12′40.6″N 139°32′3.2″E
- Country: Japan
- Region: Kantō
- Prefecture: Gunma
- District: Ōra

Area
  - Total: 19.64 km^{2} (7.58 sq mi)

Population (October 2020)
  - Total: 11,154
  - Density: 567.9/km^{2} (1,471/sq mi)
- Time zone: UTC+9 (Japan Standard Time)
- Tree: Buxus microphylla
- Flower: Chrysanthemum
- Phone number: 0276-84-3117
- Address: 250-1 Niisato, Meiwa-machi, Gunma-ken 370-0795
- Website: Official website

Meiwa (明和町, Meiwa-machi) is a town located in Gunma Prefecture, Japan. As of 1 October 2020, the town had an estimated population of 11154 in 4303 households, and a population density of 570 persons per km^{2}. The total area of the town is 19.64 square kilometres (7.58 sq mi).

== Geography ==
Meiwa is located in the northern Kantō Plains in the extreme southern corner Gunma prefecture, bordered by Saitama Prefecture to the south. It is 11 km (7 mi) long from east to west and 3 km (2 mi) long from north to south. The Tone River passes through the town. Located only 60 kilometres (37 mi) from metropolitan Tokyo, many of its residents commute to Tokyo for work or schooling.

=== Surrounding municipalities ===
Gunma Prefecture

- Chiyoda
- Itakura
- Tatebayashi

Saitama Prefecture

- Gyōda
- Hanyū

=== Climate ===
Meiwa has a humid subtropical climate (Köppen Cfa) characterized by hot summers and cold winters. The average annual temperature in Meiwa is 14.5 °C. The average annual rainfall is 1291 mm with September as the wettest month. The temperatures are highest on average in August, at around 26.7 °C, and lowest in January, at around 3.3 °C.

== Demographics ==
Per Japanese census data, the population of Itakura peaked around the year 2000 and has declined slightly since.

Historical population
Year	Pop.	±%
1920	8,191	—
1930	8,347	+1.9%
1940	8,385	+0.5%
1950	10,165	+21.2%
1960	9,211	−9.4%
1970	8,496	−7.8%
1980	9,815	+15.5%
1990	10,390	+5.9%
2000	11,474	+10.4%
2010	11,209	−2.3%
2020	10,882	−2.9%

== History ==
The villages of Sanuki, Umeshima and Chieda were created within Ōra District, Gunma Prefecture on April 1, 1889, with the creation of the modern municipalities system after the Meiji Restoration. On March 1, 1955, the three villages merged to form the village of Meiwa. Meiwa was raised to town status on October 1, 1998.

== Government ==
Meiwa has a mayor-council form of government with a directly elected mayor and a unicameral town council of 12 members. Meiwa, together with the other municipalities in Ōra District contributes three members to the Gunma Prefectural Assembly. In terms of national politics, the town is part of Gunma 3rd district of the lower house of the Diet of Japan.

== Economy ==
Meiwa is largely a bedroom community for Tokyo and nearby Tatebayashi. Agricultural products include Japanese Pear, Kyoho Grapes, Cyclamen, Carnation and Peach.

== Education ==
Meiwa has two public elementary schools and one public middle schools operated by the town government, and one public high school operated by the Gunma Prefectural Board of Education.

== Transportation ==
=== Railway ===
Tōbu Railway – Tobu Isesaki Line

- Kawamata

=== Highway ===
- National Route 122
