= Cartrema floridana =

Conservation status
- Near Threatened (IUCN 3.1)

- Vulnerable (NatureServe)

Scientific classification
- Kingdom: Plantae
- Clade: Tracheophytes
- Clade: Angiosperms
- Clade: Eudicots
- Clade: Asterids
- Order: Lamiales
- Family: Oleaceae
- Genus: Cartrema
- Species: C. floridana

Binomial name
- Cartrema floridana (Chapm.) G.L.Nesom

Synonyms
- Amarolea floridana (Chapm.) L.E.Arnold; Amarolea megacarpa Small; Cartrema megacarpa (Small) Weakley; Osmanthus americanus subsp. megacarpus (Small) A.E.Murray; Osmanthus americanus var. megacarpus (Small) P.S.Green; Osmanthus floridanus Chapm.; Osmanthus megacarpus (Small) Small

Species of flowering plant

Cartrema floridana (synonym Osmanthus floridanus), commonly known as wild olive or devilwood, is a species of flowering plant in the olive family, Oleaceae. It is an evergreen shrub or tree endemic to central Florida.

Cartrema floridana ranges from Dixie and Putnam counties in the north to southern Highlands County in the south. It grows in dry oak hammocks, turkey oak barrens, rosemary balds, and oak and sand pine scrubland from 10 to 100 meters elevation. The species is threatened by habitat loss and degradation. Over 60% of the Florida scrub has been lost to urbanization or conversion to agriculture, including citrus orchards. The remaining habitat is fragmented and has been degraded by disruption of the natural fire regimes which foster habitat succession.
