= Horigome Station =

Railway station in Sano, Tochigi Prefecture, Japan

TI35 Horigome Station 堀米駅
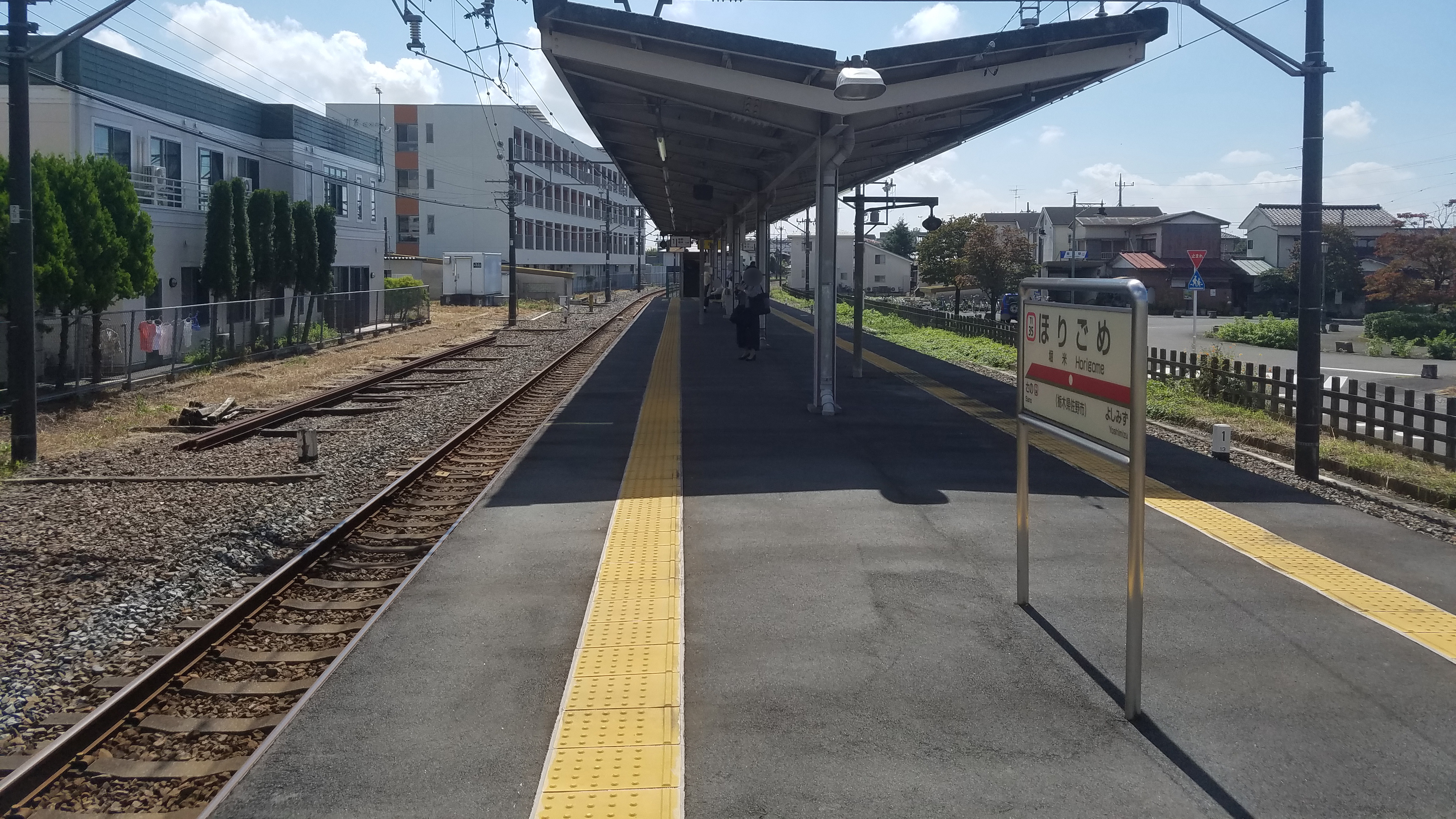
- The platform in September 2021

General information
- Location: 1274 Horigome-cho, Sano-shi, Tochigi-ken 327-0843; Japan
- Coordinates: 36.3287°N 139.5803°E
- Operator: Tōbu Railway
- Line: Tōbu Sano Line
- Distance: 13.1 km from Tatebayashi
- Platforms: 1 island platform

Other information
- Station code: TI-35
- Website: Official website

History
- Opened: 23 June 1889

Passengers
- FY2020: 424 daily

Services
Preceding station	Tobu Railway	Following station
Sano TI34 towards Tatebayashi	Sano Line	Yoshimizu TI36 towards Kuzū
Location
- Location within Tochigi Prefecture Location within Japan

Horigome Station (堀米駅, Horigome-eki) is a railway station in the city of Sano, Tochigi, Japan, operated by the private railway operator Tobu Railway. The station is numbered "TI-35".

== Lines ==
Horigome Station is served by the Tobu Sano Line, and is located 13.1 km from the terminus of the line at Tatebayashi.

== Station layout ==
Horigome Station has one island platform, connected to the station building by an underground passageway.

=== Platforms ===
1	■ Tobu Sano Line	for Tatebayashi
2	■ Tobu Sano Line	for Kuzū

== History ==
Horigome Station opened on 23 June 1889. It was relocated 2.1 km from its original position in the direction of Sano Station on 20 March 1894.

From 17 March 2012, station numbering was introduced on all Tobu lines, with Horigome Station becoming "TI-35".

== Passenger statistics ==
In fiscal 2019, the station was used by an average of 424 passengers daily (boarding passengers only).

== Surrounding area ==
- Sano Horigome-nishi Post Office

== See also ==
- List of railway stations in Japan
