= Tajima Station (Tochigi) =

Railway station in Sano, Tochigi Prefecture, Japan

TI32 Tajima Station 田島駅
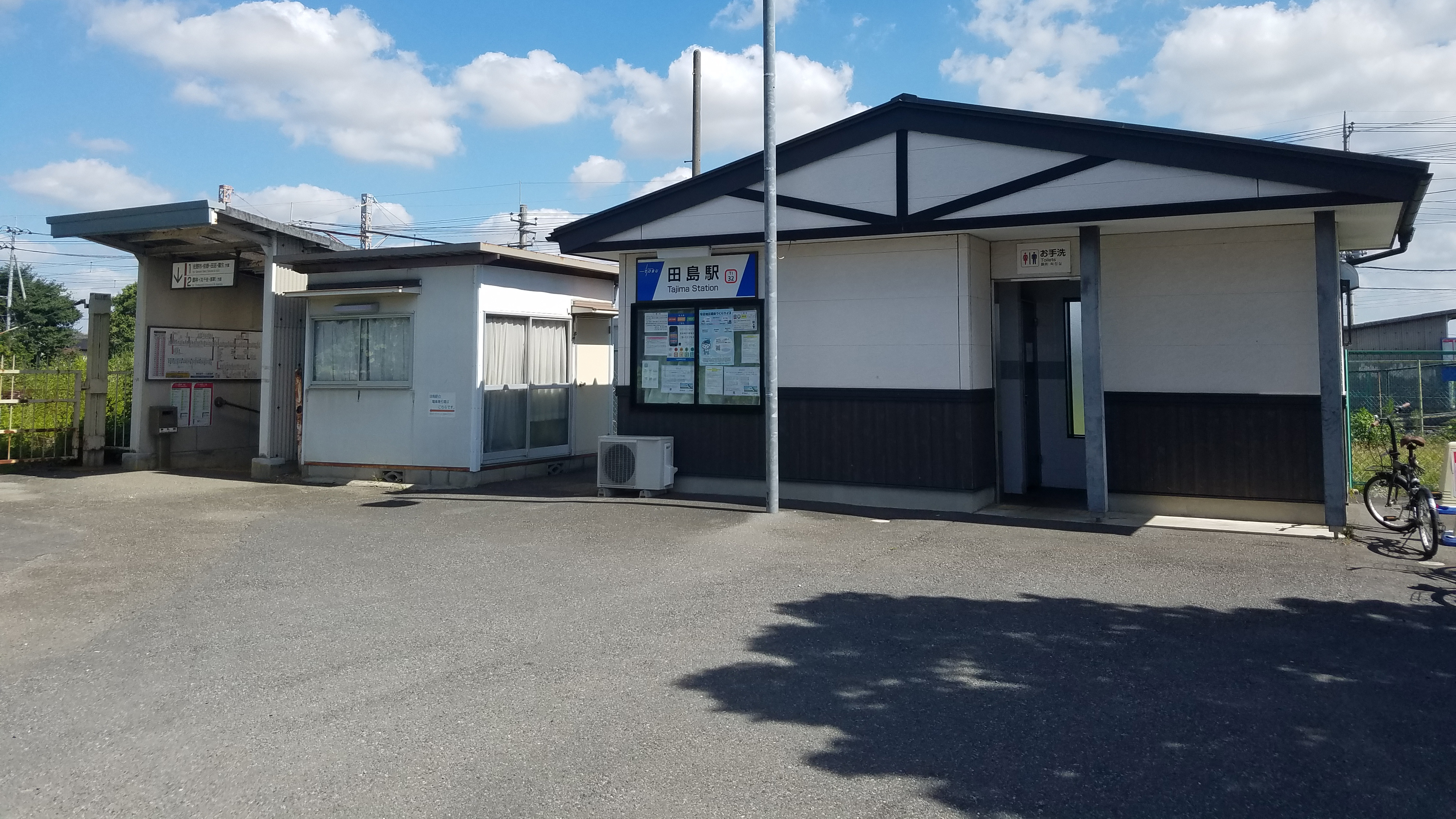
- Tajima Station in September 2021

General information
- Location: 184 Tajima-cho, Sano-shi, Tochigi-ken 327-0031; Japan
- Coordinates: 36.2904°N 139.5649°E
- Operator: Tōbu Railway
- Line: Tōbu Sano Line
- Distance: 6.9 km from Tatebayashi
- Platforms: 1 island platform

Other information
- Station code: TI-32
- Website: Official website

History
- Opened: 2 August 1914

Passengers
- FY2020: 132 daily

Services
Preceding station	Tobu Railway	Following station
Watarase TI31 towards Tatebayashi	Sano Line	Sanoshi TI33 towards Kuzū
Location
- Location within Tochigi Prefecture Location within Japan

Tajima Station (田島駅, Tajima-eki) is a railway station in the city of Sano, Tochigi, Japan, operated by the private railway operator Tōbu Railway. The station is numbered "TI-32".

== Lines ==
Tajima Station is served by the Tōbu Sano Line, and is located 6.9 km from the terminus of the line at Tatebayashi.

== Station layout ==
Tajima Station has one island platform, connected to the station building by an underground passageway.

=== Platforms ===
1	■ Tōbu Sano Line	for Kuzū
2	■ Tōbu Sano Line	for Tatebayashi

== History ==
Tajima Station opened on 2 August 1914.

From 17 March 2012, station numbering was introduced on all Tōbu lines, with Watarase Station becoming "TI-32".

== Passenger statistics ==
In fiscal 2019, the station was used by an average of 132 passengers daily (boarding passengers only).

== Surrounding area ==
- Japan National Route 50 – Sano Bypass
- Haneda Industrial Park

== See also ==
- List of railway stations in Japan
