= Kuzū Fossil Museum =

Museum in Sano, Tochigi Prefecture, Japan

- 佐野市葛生化石館
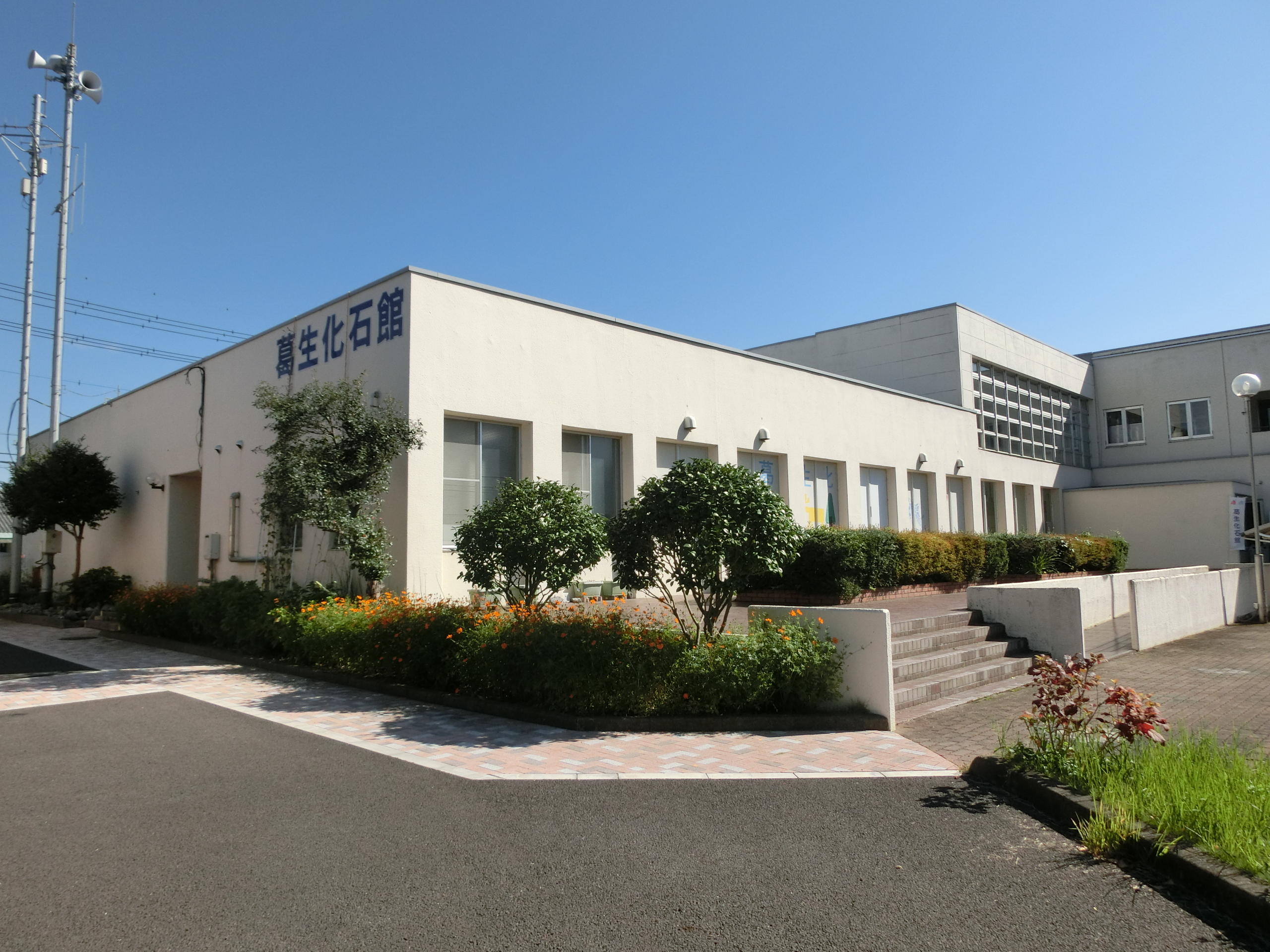
- Interactive map of the Kuzū Fossil Museum area

General information
- Location: 1-11-15 Kuzū-higashi, Sano, Tochigi Prefecture, Japan
- Coordinates: 36°24′05″N 139°36′41″E
- Opened: 2005

Website
- Official website

Kuzū Fossil Museum (佐野市葛生化石館, Sano-shi Kuzū kaseki-kan) is a registered museum in Sano, Tochigi Prefecture, Japan that opened with the merger of Kuzū into Sano in 2005. The collection and displays relate to the geology and natural history of the area, with a particular focus on local fossil finds. Species represented include Palaeoloxodon naumanni, Stephanorhinus kirchbergensis, and Sinomegaceros yabei.

== See also ==
- List of fossil mammals of Japan
