= Yoshimizu Station =

Railway station in Sano, Tochigi Prefecture, Japan

TI36 Yoshimizu Station 吉水駅
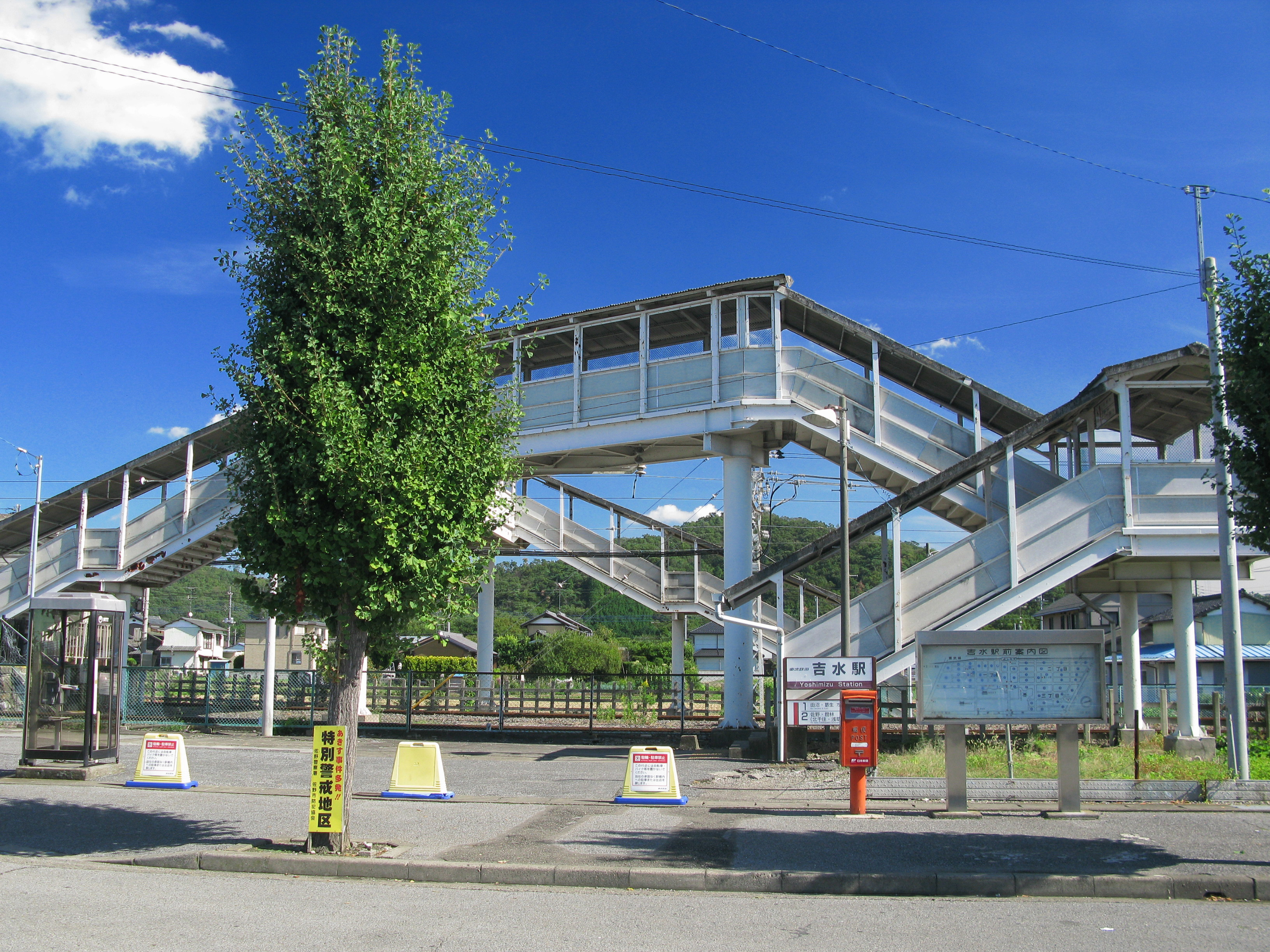
- Yoshimizu Station in October 2012

General information
- Location: 60-1 Shin-Yoshimizu, Sano-shi, Tochigi-ken 327-0314; Japan
- Coordinates: 36.3450°N 139.5797°E
- Operator: Tōbu Railway
- Line: Tōbu Sano Line
- Distance: 13.1 km from Tatebayashi
- Platforms: 1 island platform

Other information
- Station code: TI-36
- Website: Official website

History
- Opened: 1 July 1915

Passengers
- FY2020: 994 daily

Services
Preceding station	Tobu Railway	Following station
Horigome TI35 towards Tatebayashi	Sano Line	Tanuma TI37 towards Kuzū
Location
- Location within Tochigi Prefecture Location within Japan

Yoshimizu Station (吉水駅, Yoshimizu-eki) is a railway station in the city of Sano, Tochigi, Japan, operated by the private railway operator Tōbu Railway. The station is numbered "TI-35".

== Lines ==
Yoshimizu Station is served by the Tōbu Sano Line, and is located 13.1 km from the terminus of the line at Tatebayashi.

== Station layout ==
Yoshimizu Station has one island platform, connected to the station building by an overhead passageway.

=== Platforms ===
1	■ Tōbu Sano Line	for Kuzū
2	■ Tōbu Sano Line	for Tatebayashi

== History ==
Yoshimizu Station opened on 23 June 1889. It was relocated 2.1 km from its original position in the direction of Sano Station on 1 February 1915.

From 17 March 2012, station numbering was introduced on all Tōbu lines, with Yoshimizu Station becoming "TI-36".

== Passenger statistics ==
In fiscal 2019, the station was used by an average of 994 passengers daily (boarding passengers only).

== Surrounding area ==
- Tanuma-Yoshimizu Post Office

== See also ==
- List of railway stations in Japan
