= Tada Station (Tochigi) =

Railway station in Sano, Tochigi Prefecture, Japan

TI38 Tada Station 多田駅
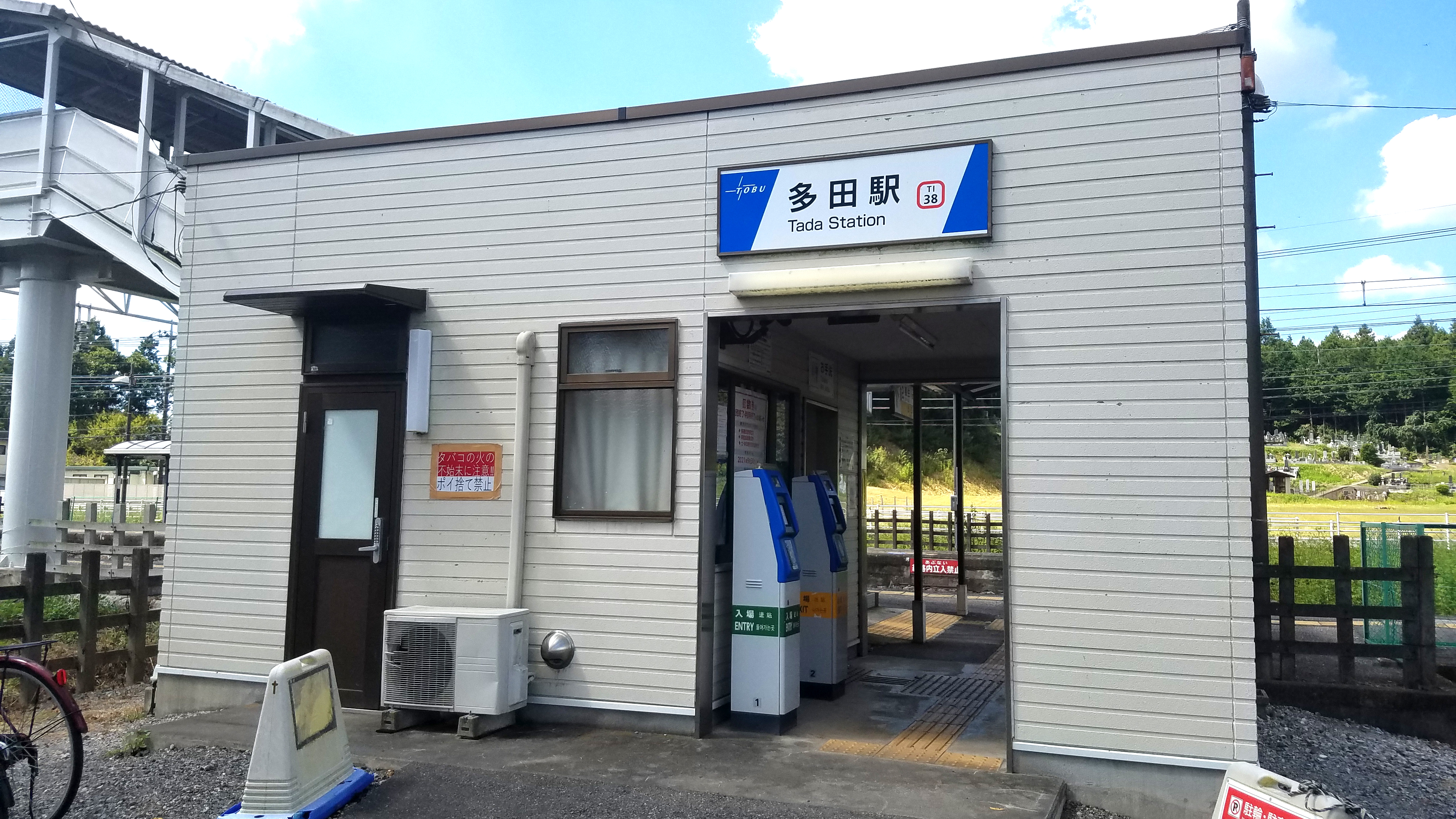
- Tada Station in September 2021

General information
- Location: 1272-2 Tada-cho, Sano-shi, Tochigi-ken 327-0311; Japan
- Coordinates: 36°22′42″N 139°35′36″E
- Operator: Tōbu Railway
- Line: Tōbu Sano Line
- Distance: 19.3 km from Tatebayashi
- Platforms: 2 side platforms
- Tracks: 2

Other information
- Status: Unstaffed
- Station code: TI-38
- Website: Official website

History
- Opened: 20 March 1894
- Rebuilt: 2007

Passengers
- FY2019: 151 (daily)

Services
Preceding station	Tobu Railway	Following station
Tanuma TI37 towards Tatebayashi	Sano Line	Kuzū TI39 Terminus
Location
- Location within Tochigi Prefecture Location within Japan

Tada Station (多田駅, Tada-eki) is a railway station in the city of Sano, Tochigi, Japan, operated by the private railway operator Tōbu Railway. The station is numbered "TI-38".

== Lines ==
Tada Station is served by the Tōbu Sano Line, and is located 19.3 km from the terminus of the line at Tatebayashi.

== Station layout ==
Tada Station has two opposed side platforms, connected to the station building by a footbridge. A third track for freight trains originally lay between the current tracks.

=== Platforms ===
1	■ Tōbu Sano Line	for Tatebayashi
2	■ Tōbu Sano Line	for Kuzū

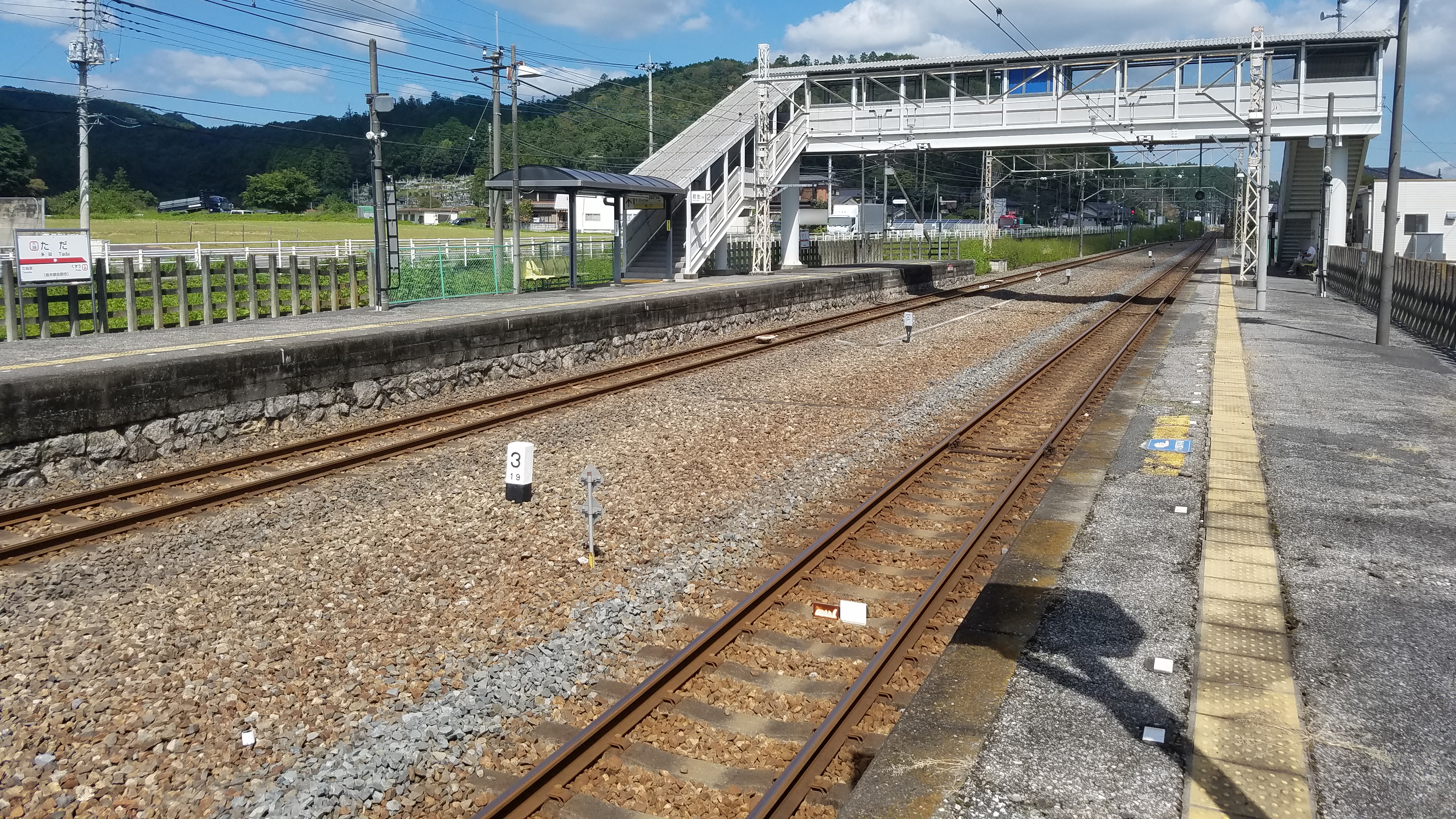
The platforms in September 2021

== History ==
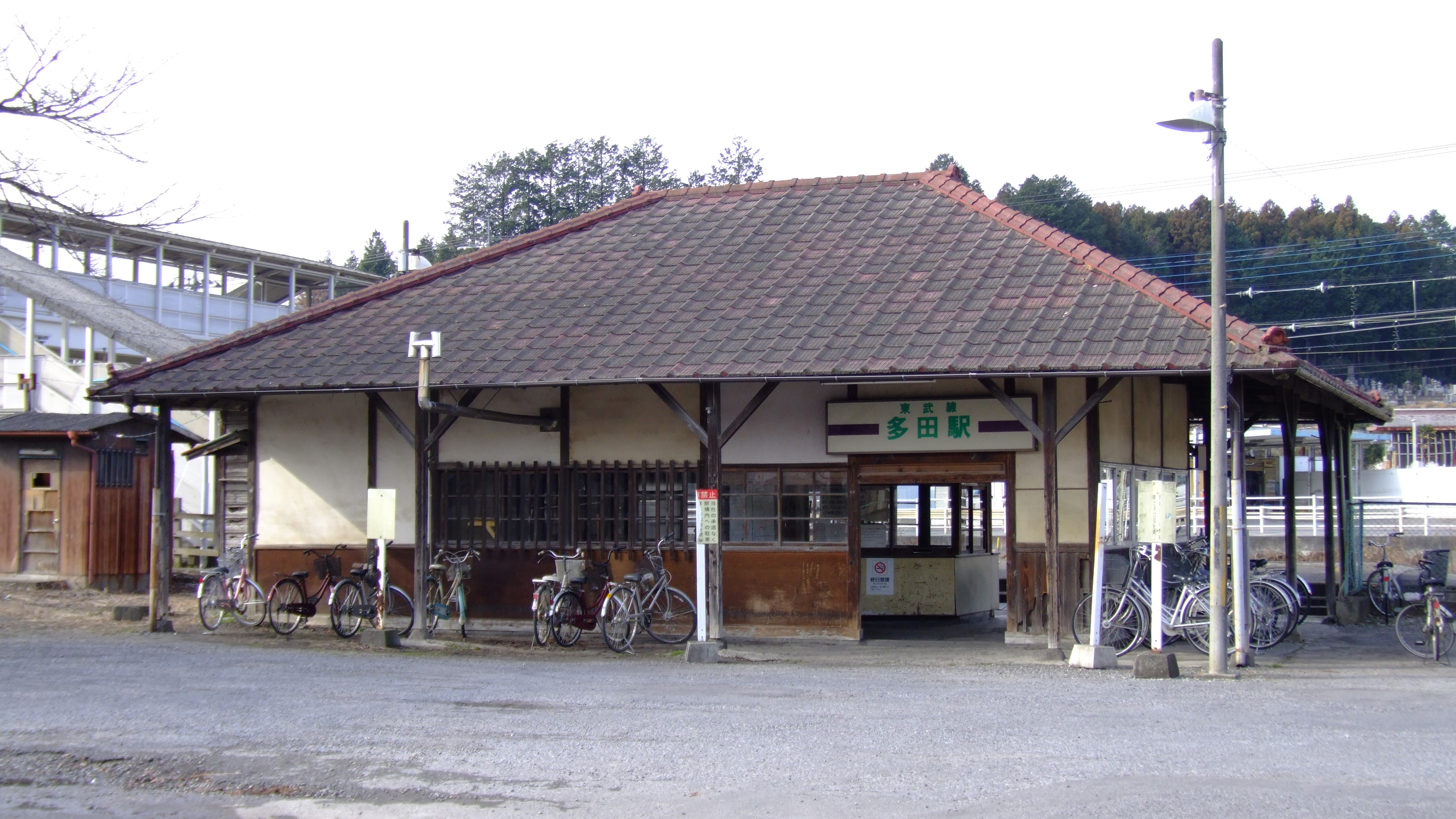
The original station building in January 2007

Tada Station opened on 20 March 1894. From 1 September 1973, the station became unstaffed. The original station building was replaced by a modern prefabricated structure in October 2007.

From 17 March 2012, station numbering was introduced on all Tōbu lines, with Tada Station becoming "TI-38".

== Passenger statistics ==
In fiscal 2019, the station was used by an average of 151 passengers daily (boarding passengers only).

== Surrounding area ==
- National Route 293
- Tanuma Industrial Park

== See also ==
- List of railway stations in Japan
