= Kawamata Station =

Railway station in Meiwa, Gunma Prefecture, Japan

TI08 Kawamata Station 川俣駅
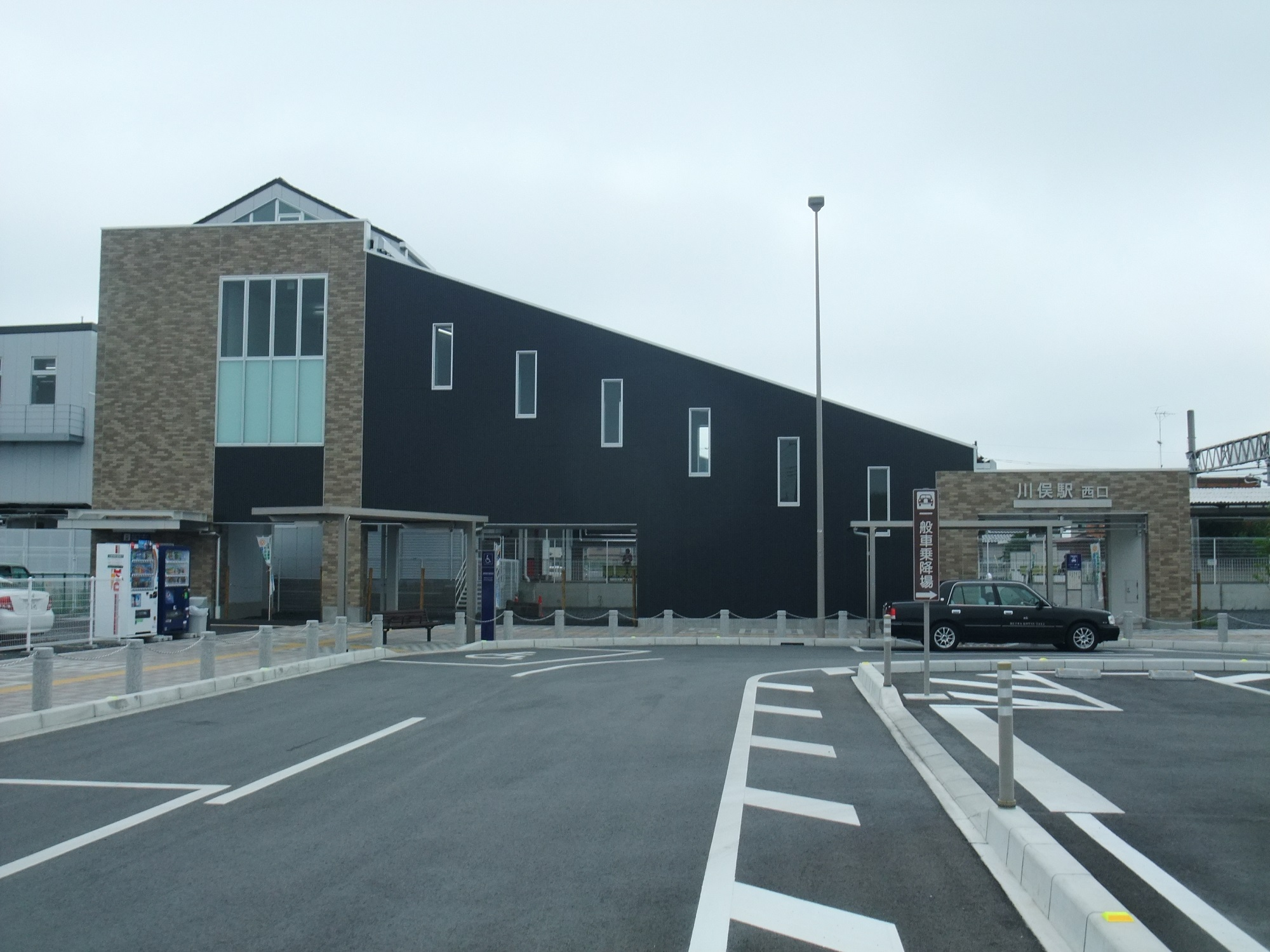
- Kawamata Station building in July 2016

General information
- Location: 328-3 Nakaya, Meiwa-machi, Ōra-gun, Gunma-ken 370-0713; Japan
- Coordinates: 36.2085°N 139.5263°E
- Operator: Tōbu Railway
- Line: Tōbu Isesaki Line
- Distance: 70.5 km from Asakusa
- Platforms: 2 side platforms

Other information
- Station code: TI-08
- Website: Official website

History
- Opened: 23 April 1903

Passengers
- FY2019: 2895 daily

Services
| Preceding station | Tobu Railway | Following station |
|---|---|---|
| Hanyū TI07 towards Tōbu-Dōbutsu-Kōen | Isesaki Line Section Express Section Semi Express | Morinjimae TI09 towards Tatebayashi |
| Hanyū TI07 towards Tōbu-Dōbutsu-Kōen | Isesaki Line Local | Morinjimae TI09 towards Isesaki |
Location
- Location within Gunma Prefecture Location within Japan

Kawamata Station (川俣駅, Kawamata-eki) is a passenger railway station in the town of Meiwa, Gunma, Japan, operated by the private railway operator Tōbu Railway.

== Lines ==
Kawamata Station is served by the Tōbu Isesaki Line, and is located 70.5 km from the line's Tokyo terminus at Asakusa.

== Station layout ==
This station has two opposed side platforms. Platform 1 is for stops in the direction of Tatebayashi and platform 2 is for stops in the direction of Asakusa. After passing through the wicket, a passenger will step onto platform one. Platform two can be reached by going up a set of stairs, through a short hallway and down another set of stairs. There is a toilet on the Tatebayashi platform.

=== Platforms ===
| 1 | ■ Tōbu Isesaki Line | for Tatebayashi, Ashikagashi, and Ōta |
| 2 | ■ Tōbu Isesaki Line | for Kuki, Tōbu-Dōbutsu-Kōen, Kasukabe, Kita-Senju, and Asakusa |

== History ==
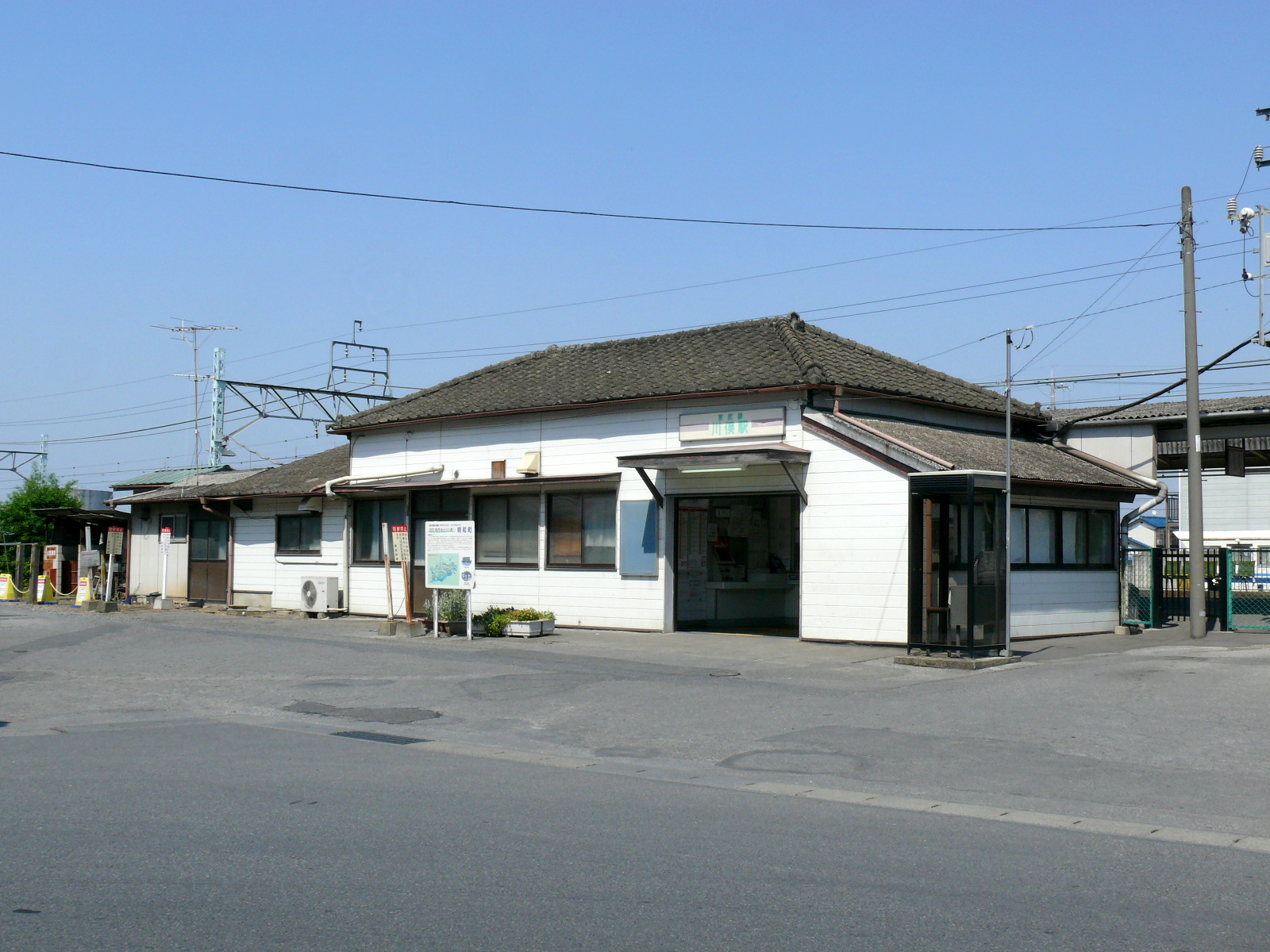
The station in May 2010, before rebuilding

Kawamata Station first opened on 23 April 1903 at a location on the bank of the Tone River. The station re-opened at its current location on 27 August 1907.

From 17 March 2012, station numbering was introduced on all Tōbu lines, with Kawamata Station becoming "TI-08".

== Passenger statistics ==
In fiscal 2019, the station was used by an average of 2895 passengers daily (boarding passengers only).

== Surrounding area ==
- Meiwa town office
- Meiwa town library
- Meiwa town gymnasium
- Kawamata Post Office
- Umebara JA

== See also ==
- List of railway stations in Japan
