= Tanuma Station =

Railway station in Sano, Tochigi Prefecture, Japan

TI37 Tanuma Station 田沼駅
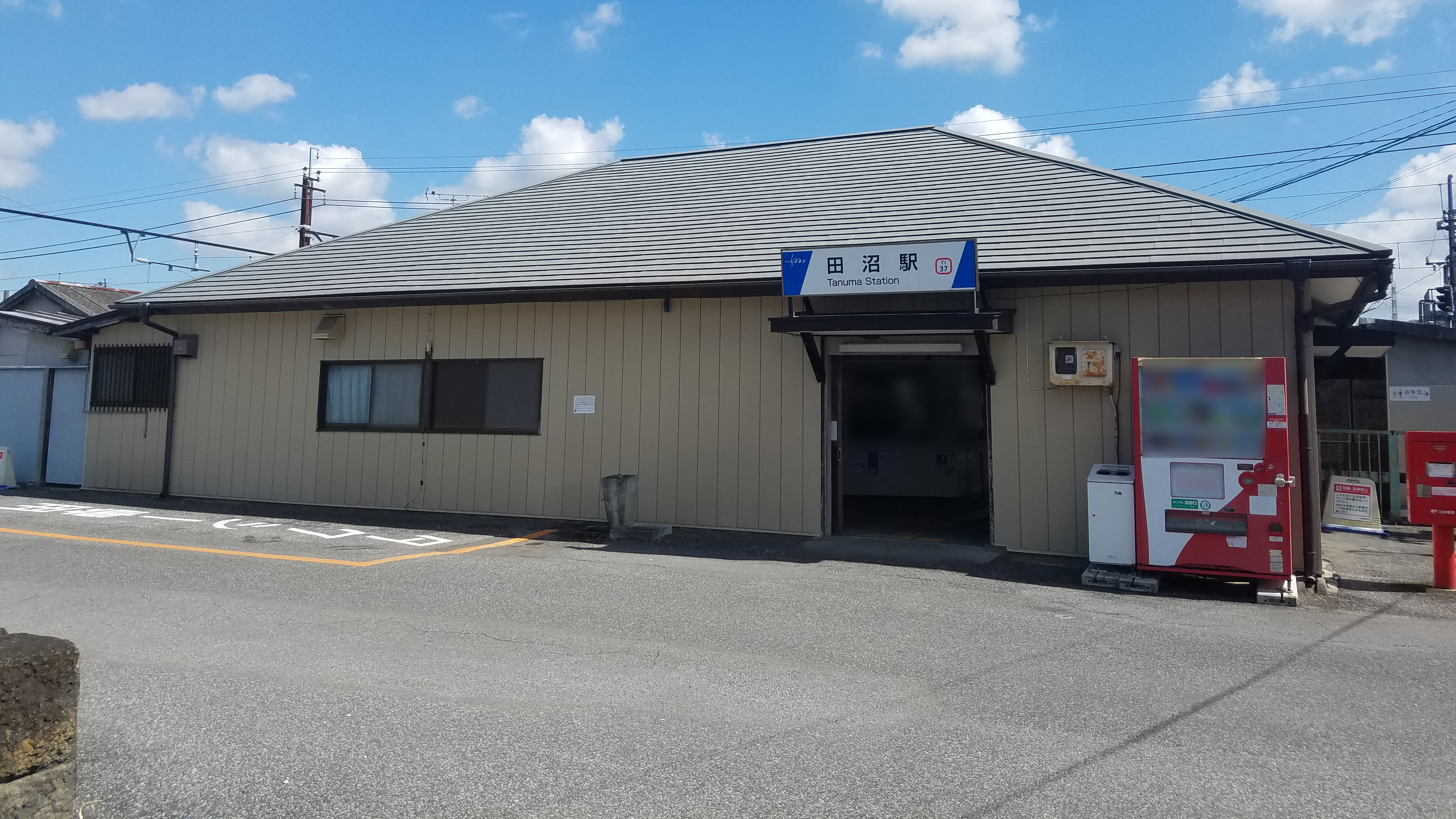
- Tanuma Station in September 2021

General information
- Location: 1766 Tochigi-cho, Sano-shi, Tochigi-ken 327-0312; Japan
- Coordinates: 36.3671°N 139.5817°E
- Operator: Tōbu Railway
- Line: Tōbu Sano Line
- Distance: 17.7 km from Tatebayashi
- Platforms: 1 island platform

Other information
- Station code: TI-37
- Website: Official website

History
- Opened: 20 March 1894

Passengers
- FY2020: 979 daily

Services
Preceding station	Tobu Railway	Following station
Sano TI34 towards Asakusa	Ryomo	Kuzū TI39 Terminus
Yoshimizu TI36 towards Tatebayashi	Sano Line	Tada TI38 towards Kuzū
Location
- Location within Tochigi Prefecture Location within Japan

Tanuma Station (田沼駅, Tanuma-eki) is a railway station in the city of Sano, Tochigi, Japan, operated by the private railway operator Tōbu Railway. The station is numbered "TI-37".

== Lines ==
Tanuma Station is served by the Tōbu Sano Line, and is located 17.7 km from the terminus of the line at Tatebayashi.

== Station layout ==
Tanuma Station consists of one island platform, connected to the station building by an underground passage.

=== Platforms ===
1	■ Tōbu Sano Line	for Kuzū
2	■ Tōbu Sano Line	for Tatebayashi

== History ==
Tanuma Station opened on 20 March 1894.

From 17 March 2012, station numbering was introduced on all Tōbu lines, with Tanuma Station becoming "TI-37".

== Passenger statistics ==
In fiscal 2019, the station was used by an average of 979 passengers daily (boarding passengers only).

== Surrounding area ==
- Tanuma Post Office
- Karasawayama Jinja
- former Tanuma town hall

== See also ==
- List of railway stations in Japan
