= Sano Station =

Railway station in Sano, Tochigi Prefecture, Japan

TI34 Sano Station 佐野駅
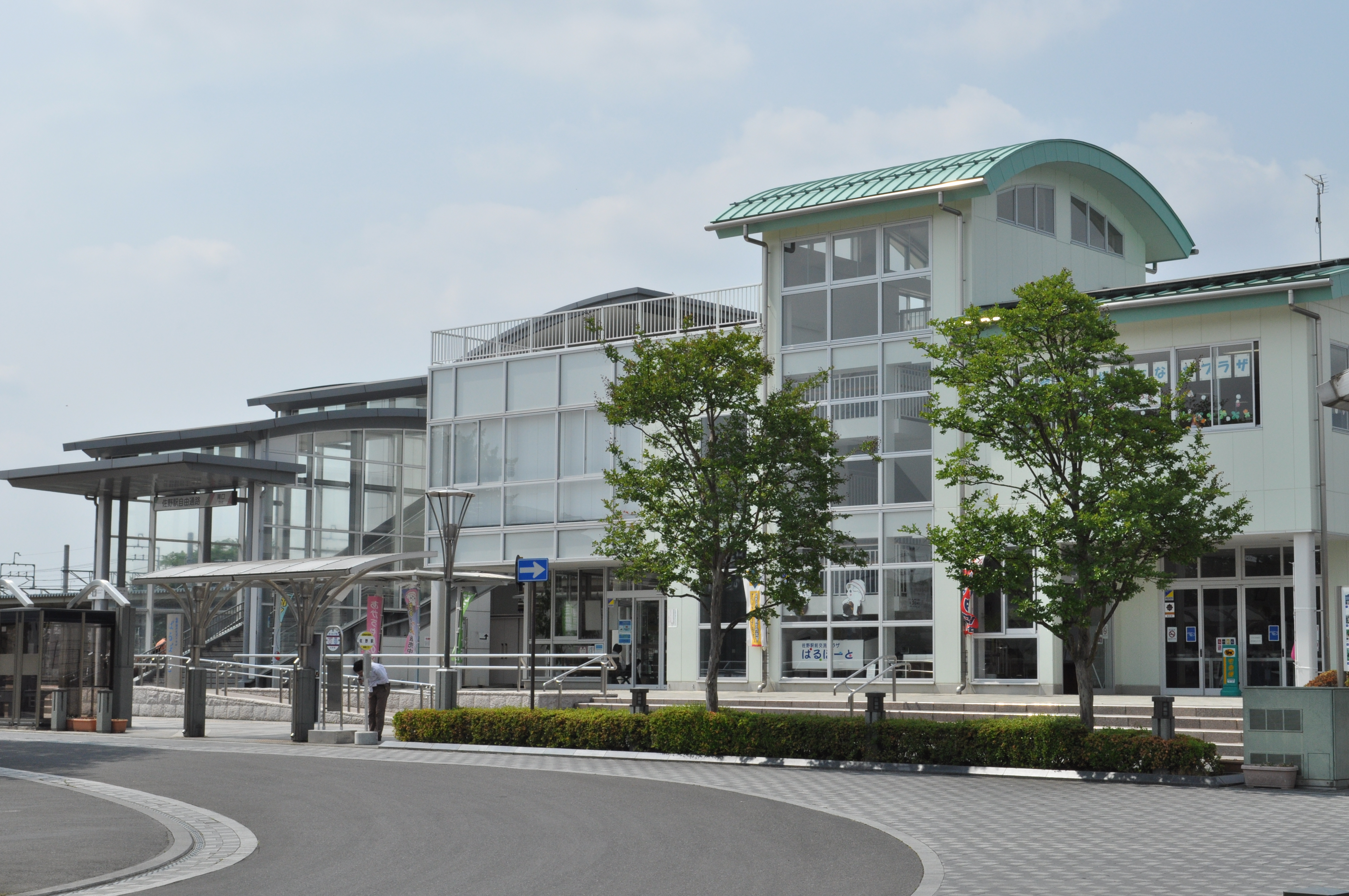
- Sano Station in May 2012

General information
- Location: Wakamatsu-cho, Sano-shi, Tochigi-ken 327-0846; Japan
- Coordinates: 36.3169°N 139.5787°E
- Operator: JR East; Tōbu Railway
- Lines: ■ Ryōmō Line; Tōbu Sano Line
- Distance: 26.6 km from Oyama
- Platforms: 2 island platforms

Other information
- Station code: TI-34 (Tōbu)

History
- Opened: 22 May 1888

Passengers
- FY2019: 3,347 (JR East); 3,362 (Tōbu) daily

Services
Preceding station	JR East	Following station
Tomita towards Takasaki	Ryōmō Line	Iwafune towards Oyama
Preceding station	Tobu Railway	Following station
Sanoshi TI33 towards Asakusa	Ryomo	Tanuma TI37 towards Kuzū
Sanoshi TI33 towards Tatebayashi	Sano Line	Horigome TI35 towards Kuzū
Location
- Location within Tochigi Prefecture Location within Japan

Sano Station (佐野駅, Sano-eki) is a junction railway station in the city of Sano, Tochigi, Japan. It is jointly operated by JR East and the private railway operator Tōbu Railway. The station is numbered "TI-34" in the Tobu Railway system.

== Lines ==
Sano Station is served by the JR East Ryōmō Line, and is 26.6 km from the terminus of that line at Oyama Station. It is also on the Tōbu Sano Line, and is located 9.0 km from the terminus of the line at Tatebayashi.

== Station layout ==
Sano Station has two island platforms, connected to the station building by a footbridge.

=== JR East platforms ===
1	■ Ryōmō Line	for Takasaki
2	■ Ryōmō Line	for Oyama

=== Tobu platforms ===
1	■ Tōbu Sano Line	for Kuzū
2	■ Tōbu Sano Line	for Tatebayashi

== History ==
What is now the JR East station first opened on 22 May 1888. The Tōbu station opened on 30 March 1894. The current station building was completed in 2003.

From 17 March 2012, station numbering was introduced on all Tōbu lines, with Sano Station becoming "TI-34".

== Passenger statistics ==
In fiscal 2019, the Tōbu station was used by an average of 3362 passengers daily (boarding passengers only). The JR East station was used by 3,347 passengers (alighting) daily.

== Surrounding area ==
- Sano Post Office
- Sano City Hall
- Sano City Library

== See also ==
- List of railway stations in Japan
