= Sanoshi Station =

Railway station in Sano, Tochigi Prefecture, Japan

TI33 Sanoshi Station 佐野市駅
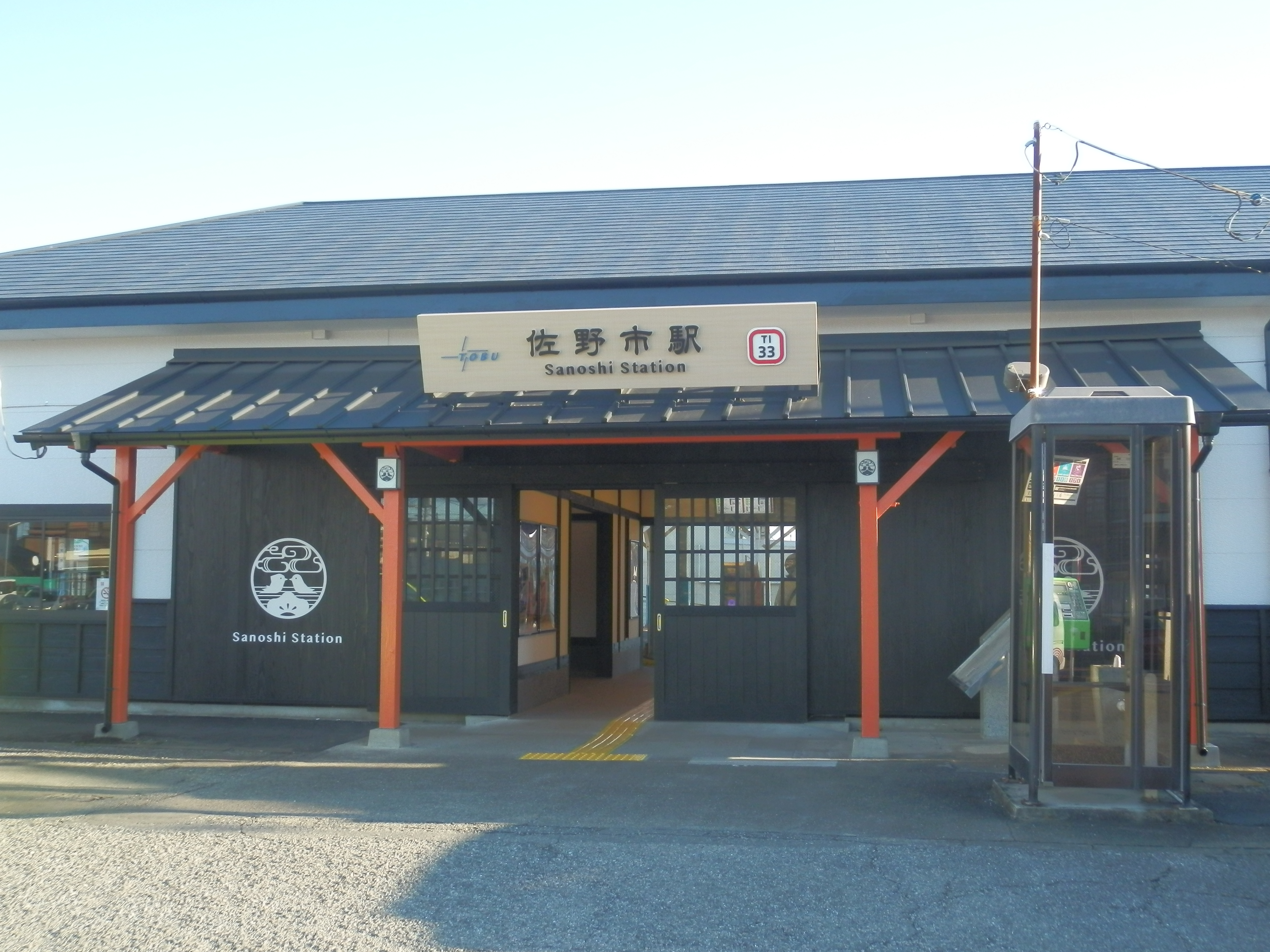
- Sanoshi Station in January 2020

General information
- Location: 2164 Uwadai-cho, Sano-shi, Tochigi-ken 327-0006; Japan
- Coordinates: 36.2904°N 139.5649°E
- Operator: Tōbu Railway
- Line: Tōbu Sano Line
- Distance: 9.0 km from Tatebayashi
- Platforms: 2 side platforms

Other information
- Station code: TI-33
- Website: Official website

History
- Opened: 2 August 1914
- Former names: Sanomachi (until 1943)

Passengers
- FY2020: 696 daily

Services
Preceding station	Tobu Railway	Following station
Tatebayashi TI10 towards Asakusa	Ryomo	Sano TI34 towards Kuzū
Tajima TI32 towards Tatebayashi	Sano Line	Sano TI34 towards Kuzū
Location
- Location within Tochigi Prefecture Location within Japan

Sanoshi Station (佐野市駅, Sanoshi-eki) is a railway station in the city of Sano, Tochigi, Japan, operated by the private railway operator Tōbu Railway. The station is numbered "TI-33".

== Lines ==
Sano-shi Station is served by the Tōbu Sano Line, and is located 9.0 km from the terminus of the line at Tatebayashi.

== Station layout ==
Sano-shi Station has two opposed side platforms, connected to the station building by an underground passageway.

=== Platforms ===
1	■ Tōbu Sano Line	for Kuzū
2	■ Tōbu Sano Line	for Tatebayashi

== History ==
Sano-shi Station opened on 2 August 1914 as Sanomachi Station (佐野町駅, Sanomachi-eki). It was renamed to its present name on 1 April 1943.

From 17 March 2012, station numbering was introduced on all Tōbu lines, with Sanoshi Station becoming "TI-32".

== Passenger statistics ==
In fiscal 2019, the station was used by an average of 696 passengers daily (boarding passengers only).

== Surrounding area ==
- Sano Shichiken-cho Post Office
- Sano Cultural Center

== See also ==
- List of railway stations in Japan
