= 渡瀬駅 =

渡瀬駅 may refer to:

- Watarase Station
- Wataze Station
