= Aso District, Tochigi =

District in Tochigi Prefecture, Japan

Aso (安蘇郡, Aso-gun) was a district located in Tochigi Prefecture, Japan.

As of 2003, the district had an estimated population of 40,915 and a density of 150.59 persons per km^{2}. The total area was 271.70 km^{2}.

== Towns and villages ==
- Kuzu
- Tanuma

== Merger ==
- On February 28, 2005 - the towns of Kuzu and Tanuma were merged into the expanded city of Sano. Therefore, Aso District was dissolved as a result of this merger.
