= Sano College =

Coordinates: 36°18′8.1″N 139°36′17.6″E

Sano Nihon University College
- 佐野日本大学短期大学
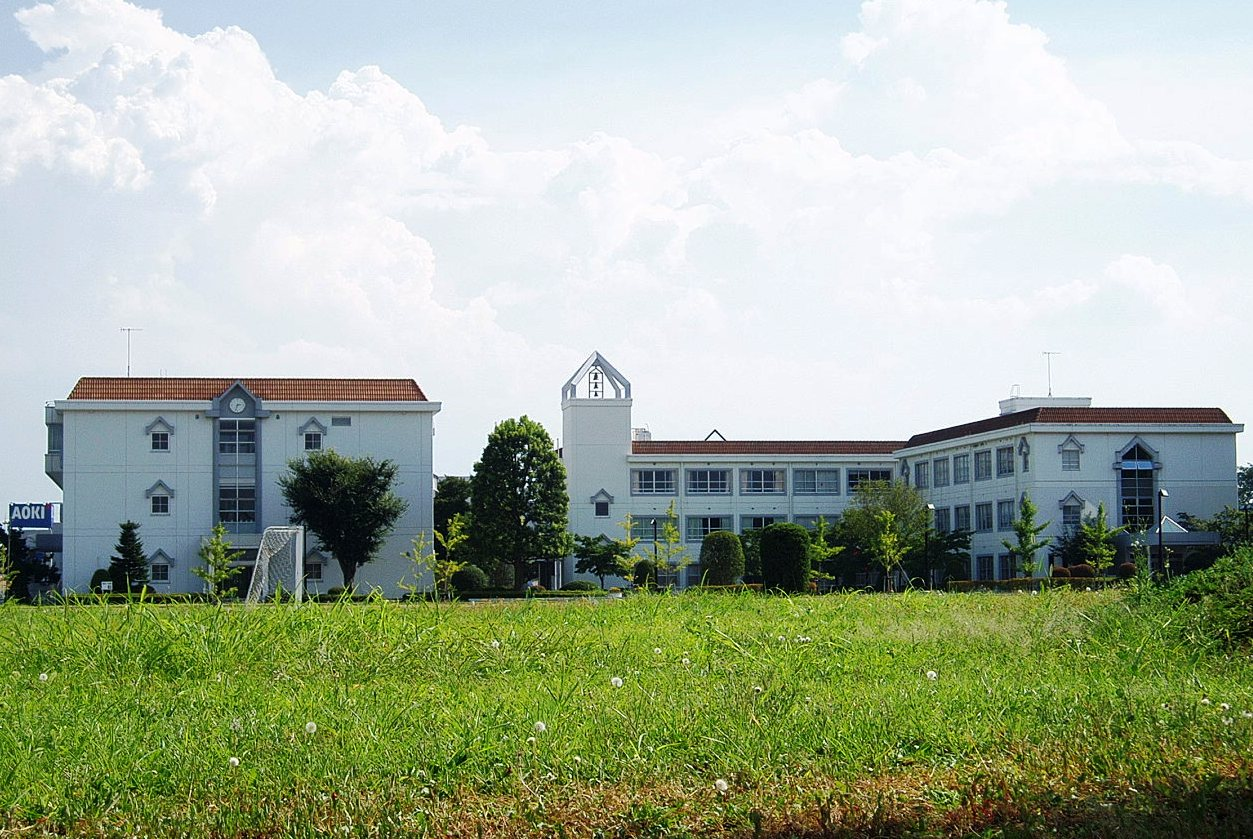
- view from the north
- Type: Private
- Established: 1990 (women’s junior college); 1996 (coeducational college)
- Location: Sano, Tochigi, Japan
- Website: http://sanotan.jp/

Sano Nihon University College (佐野日本大学短期大学, Sano Nihon daigaku tanki daigaku) is a private junior college in Sano, Tochigi, Japan.

== History ==
Originally established as a junior women's college in 1990, it became coeducational in 1996, and changed its name to Sano International Information Junior College. The college was renamed Sano College in 2002. In April 2017 it adopted the present name.

== Departments ==
Sano Nihon University College has 12 fields of study and is open to international students as of the 2016/17 school year. Currently there are students from China, Nepal, and Vietnam attending but the school is open to students worldwide. The college is also open for adults to take a class or two of their choice for personal study. There are a large number of English speaking staff and teachers.

- Childcare Field

- Nutrition Field

- Care Work Field

- Medical Office Work Field

- Business Field

- Tourism Field

- English Field

- Sport and Health Field

- Food Service Field

- Social Welfare Field

- Fashion Field

- Information Technology Field

(Coming 2017-2018 Japanese Language Institute)
