= Watarase Station =

Railway station in Tatebayashi, Gunma Prefecture, Japan

TI31 Watarase Station 渡瀬駅
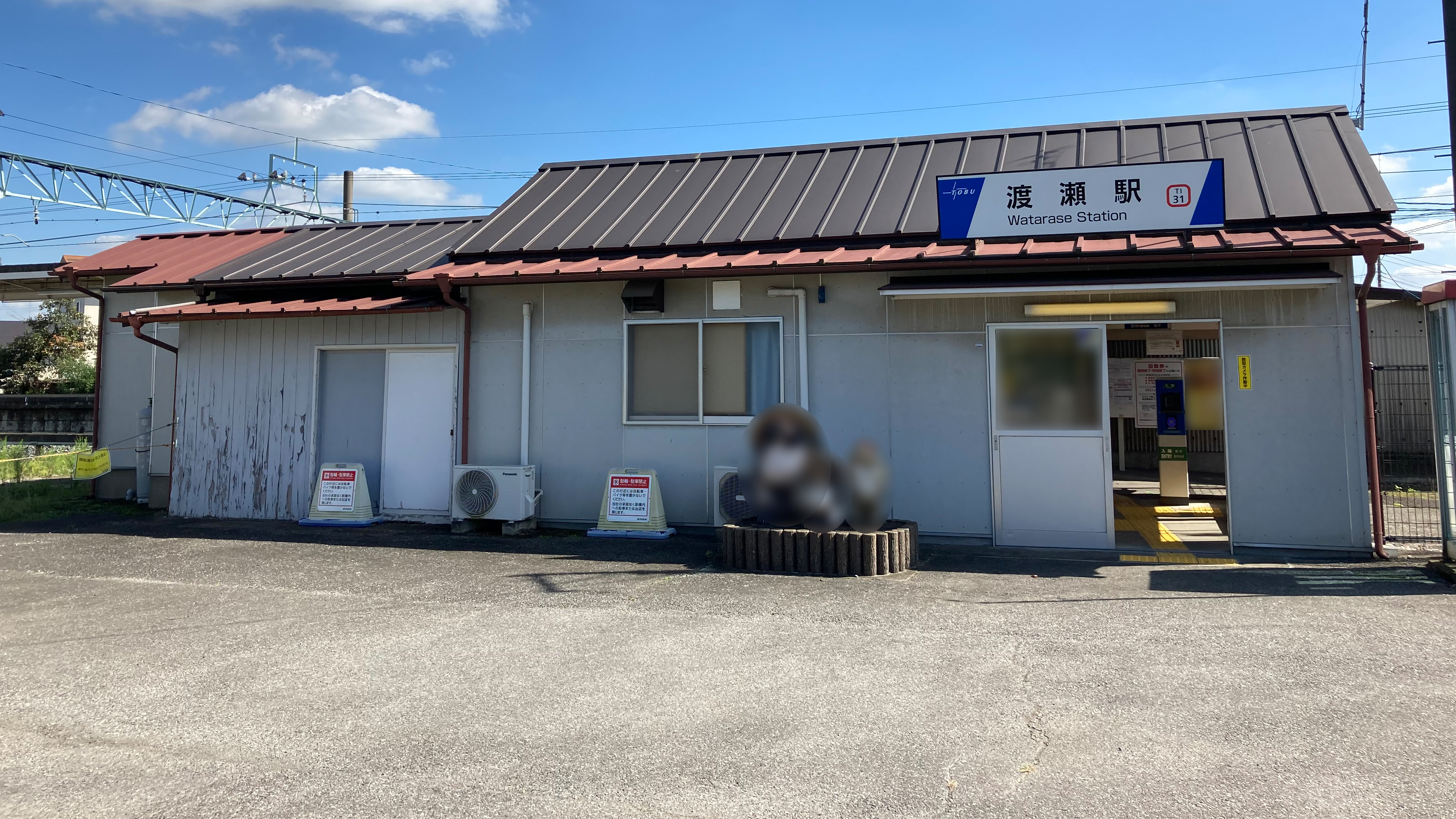
- Watarase Station in September 2021

General information
- Location: 65 Ashitsugi-cho, Tatebayashi-shi, Gunma-ken 374-0073; Japan
- Coordinates: 36°15′42″N 139°32′13″E
- Operator: Tōbu Railway
- Line: Tōbu Sano Line
- Distance: 2.7 km from Tatebayashi
- Platforms: 1 island platform

Other information
- Station code: TI-31
- Website: Official website

History
- Opened: April 10, 1926

Passengers
- FY2019: 266 daily

Services
Preceding station	Tobu Railway	Following station
Tatebayashi TI10 Terminus	Sano Line	Tajima TI32 towards Kuzū
Location
- Location within Gunma Prefecture Location within Japan

Watarase Station (渡瀬駅, Watarase-eki) is a passenger railway station in the city of Tatebayashi, Gunma, Japan, operated by the private railway operator Tōbu Railway. The station is numbered "TI-31".

== Lines ==
Watarase Station is served by the Tōbu Sano Line, and is located 2.7 km from the terminus of the line at Tatebayashi.

== Station layout ==
Watarase Station has one island platform, connected to the station building by an underground passageway.

=== Platforms ===
1	■ Tōbu Sano Line	for Kuzū
2	■ Tōbu Sano Line	for Tatebayashi

== History ==
Watarase Station opened on 16 December 1927.

From 17 March 2012, station numbering was introduced on all Tōbu lines, with Watarase Station becoming "TI-31".

== Passenger statistics ==
In fiscal 2019, the station was used by an average of 266 passengers daily (boarding passengers only).

== Surrounding area ==
- Watarase River
