= Tatara Station (Gunma) =

Railway station in Tatebayashi, Gunma Prefecture, Japan

TI11 Tatara Station 多々良駅
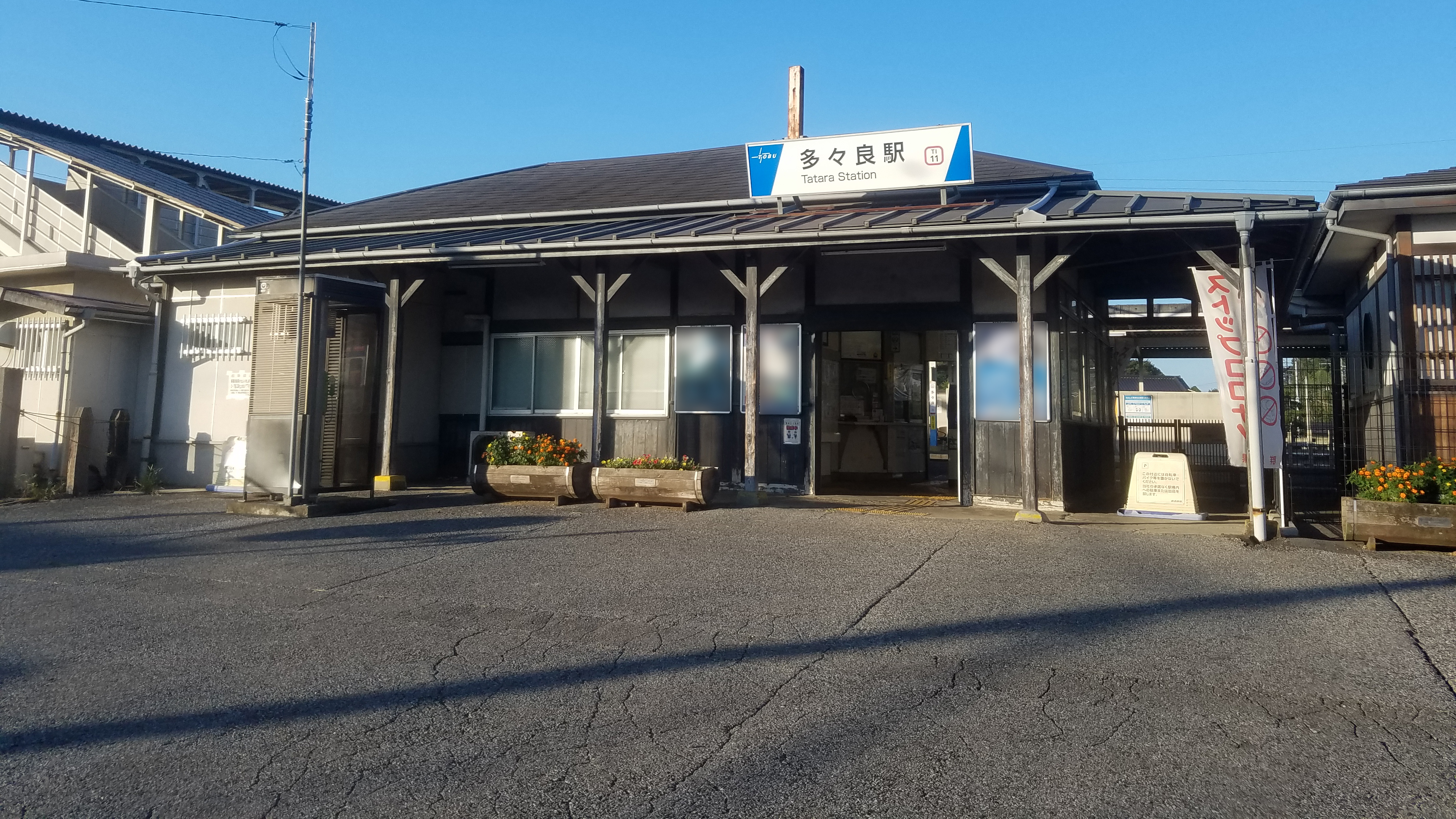
- Tatara Station in September 2021

General information
- Location: Hinatacho 987, Tatebayashi-shi, Gunma-ken 374-0076; Japan
- Coordinates: 36.2736°N 139.5000°E
- Operator: Tōbu Railway
- Line: Tōbu Isesaki Line
- Distance: 78.6 km from Asakusa
- Platforms: 2 side platforms

Other information
- Station code: TI-11
- Website: Official website

History
- Opened: 27 August 1907
- Former names: Nakano Station (to 1937)

Passengers
- FY2019: 650 daily

Services
Preceding station	Tobu Railway	Following station
Tatebayashi TI10 towards Tōbu-Dōbutsu-Kōen	Isesaki Line Local	Agata TI12 towards Isesaki
Location
- Location within Gunma Prefecture Location within Japan

Tatara Station (多々良駅, Tatara-eki) is a passenger railway station in the city of Tatebayashi, Gunma, Japan, operated by the private railway operator Tōbu Railway.

== Lines ==
Tatara Station is served by the Tōbu Isesaki Line, and is located 78.6 kilometers from the terminus of the line at Asakusa.

== Station layout ==
The station consists of two opposed side platforms, connected to the station building by a footbridge.

=== Platforms ===
1	■ Tōbu Isesaki Line	for Ashikaga and Ōta
2	■ Tōbu Isesaki Line	for Tatebayashi

== History ==
The station opened on 27 August 1907, as Nakano Station (中野駅). It was renamed Tatara Station on 1 March 1937.

From 17 March 2012, station numbering was introduced on all Tōbu lines, with Tatara Station becoming "TI-11".

== Passenger statistics ==
In fiscal 2019, the station was used by an average of 650 passengers daily (boarding passengers only).

== Surrounding area ==
- Tatebayashi Tarata Post Office
- National Route 122

== See also ==
- List of railway stations in Japan
