= Tōbu Sano Line =

Railway line in Japan

Sano Line

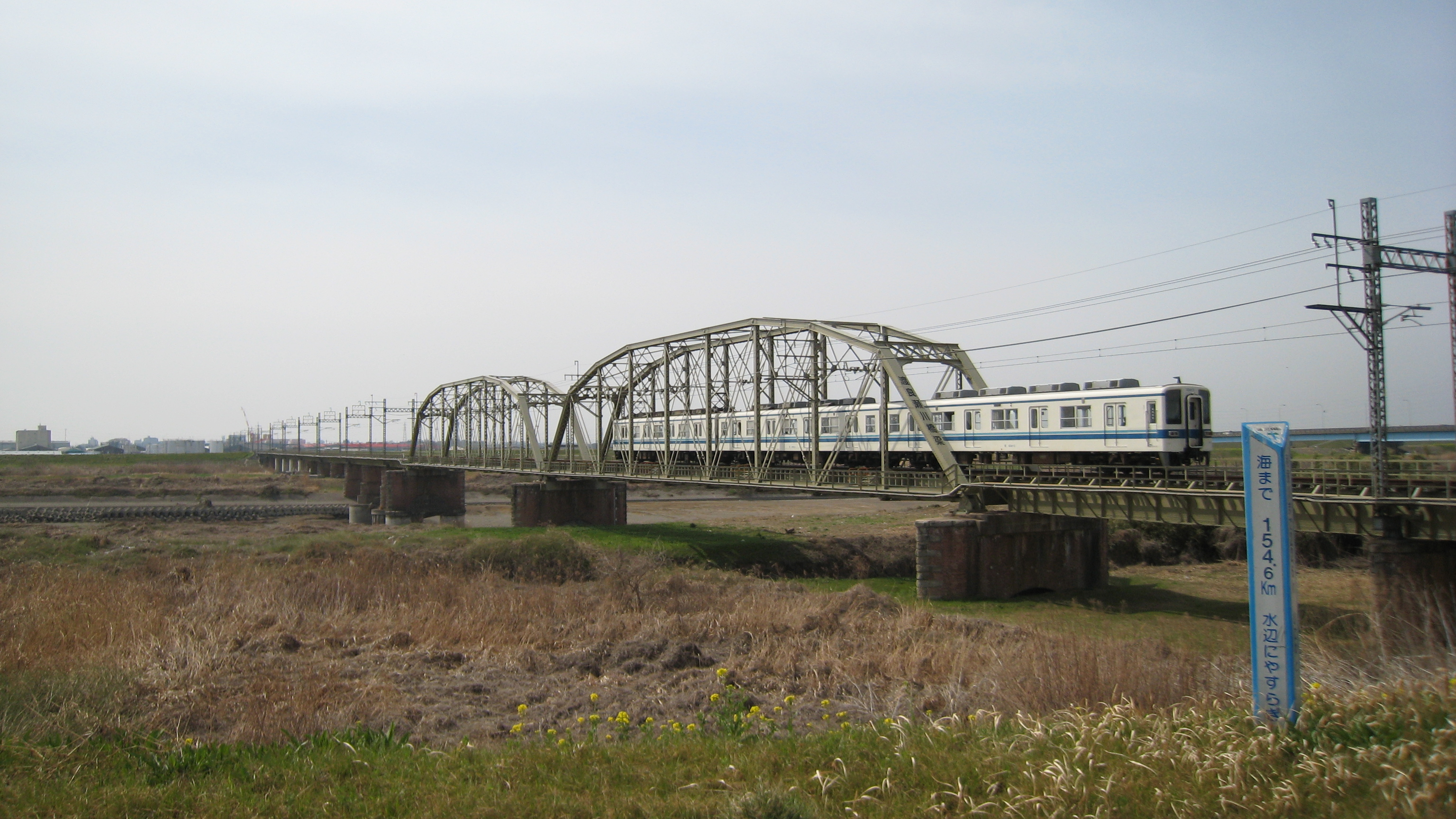
- Up train of Sano Line crossing Watarase River taken from the side of Sano city

Overview
- Native name: 佐野線
- Status: In service
- Owner: Tobu Railway Co., Ltd.
- Locale: Kanto region
- Termini: Tatebayashi; Kuzū
- Stations: 10

Service
- Type: Commuter rail
- System: Tobu Railway
- Route number: TI
- Operator(s): Tobu Railway Co., Ltd.

History
- Opened: June 23, 1889; 137 years ago

Technical
- Track gauge: 1,067 mm (3 ft 6 in)
- Electrification: 1,500 V DC, overhead catenary
- Operating speed: 70 km/h (45 mph)

The Sano Line (佐野線, Sano-sen) is a railway line in Japan, operated by the private railway operator Tobu Railway, connecting Tatebayashi Station in Tatebayashi city, Gunma Prefecture to Kuzū Station in Sano, Tochigi Prefecture.

In February 2005, the old city of Sano, the town of Tanuma and the town of Kuzu were merged into the city of Sano, so this line runs within the two cities of Tatebayashi, Gunma and Sano, Tochigi.

== Stations ==
No.	Name	Japanese	Transfers	Limited Express Ryomo	Location
TI10	Tatebayashi	館林	Isesaki Line (TI10); Koizumi Line (TI10)	●	Tatebayashi, Gunma
TI31	Watarase	渡瀬		│	Tatebayashi, Gunma
TI32	Tajima	田島		│	Sano, Tochigi
TI33	Sanoshi	佐野市		●	Sano, Tochigi
TI34	Sano	佐野	■ Ryōmō Line	●	Sano, Tochigi
TI35	Horigome	堀米		│	Sano, Tochigi
TI36	Yoshimizu	吉水		│	Sano, Tochigi
TI37	Tanuma	田沼		●	Sano, Tochigi
TI38	Tada	多田		│	Sano, Tochigi
TI39	Kuzū	葛生		●	Sano, Tochigi

== History ==
The Aso Horse Tramway opened the first section of the line between Kuzu and Koena-kashi to haul limestone and timber to the Watarase river port in 1889/90. Individual section opening dates are provided below. Steam locomotion was introduced in 1894, and in 1912 the company merged with Tobu. The line was extended to Tatebayashi in 1914, and electrified in 1927.

- On June 23, 1889, Aso-Basha-Tetsudo (Aso Horsecar, 安蘇馬車鉄道) opened the section of the line between Kuzu (葛生) and the former Yoshimizu(吉水).
- On August 10 1889 the section of the line between the former Yoshimizu and the former Sano Town (旧佐野町) was opened.
- On January 25, 1890 the section of the line between the former Sano Town and Koena-kashi(越名河岸) was opened.
- On April 13, 1893 Aso-Basha-Tetsudo changed the company name to Sano Railway (佐野鉄道).
- On March 20, 1894 the railway line between Kuzu, the former Sano Town and Koena-kashi was opened.
- On June 17, 1903 Sano Railway Line was connected to Ryomo Line (両毛線).
- On March 30, 1912 Tōbu Railway merged Sano Railway.
- On August 2, 1914 the section of the line between Tatebayashi and Sano Town (the present Sano-shi) was opened.
- On August 19 1914 the former Sano Town Station was abandoned.
- On October 16 1914 the line between Tatebayashi and Kuzū was operated directly.
- On February 1, 1915 the name of the former Yoshimizu station was changed to Horigome station (堀米駅).
- On July 1 1915 Yoshimizu station was opened.
- On July 5 1915 the passenger operation between Sano Town and Koena-kashi was abandoned.
- On February 16, 1917 abolished between the town of Sano and Koena-kashi
- On December 16, 1927 electrification was begun on the section between Tatebayashi and Kuzū. Watarase Station (渡瀬駅) was opened.
- On April 1, 1943 the name of Sano Town Station was changed to Sanoshi Station (佐野市駅).
- On May 1, 1972 Kita-Tatebayashi baggage office (北館林荷扱所) was opened between Watarase and Tajima.
- On March 18, 2006 Wanman driver-only operation was started on the local train service.

== See also ==
- List of railway lines in Japan
