= Morinjimae Station =

Railway station in Tatebayashi, Gunma Prefecture, Japan

TI09 Morinjimae Station 茂林寺前駅
- Morinjimae Station in August 2025

General information
- Location: Horiecho 1624, Tatebayashi-shi, Gunma-ken 374-0033; Japan
- Coordinates: 36.2266°N 139.5272°E
- Operator: Tōbu Railway
- Line: Tōbu Isesaki Line
- Distance: 72.4 km from Asakusa
- Platforms: 2 side platforms

Other information
- Station code: TI-09
- Website: Official website

History
- Opened: 1 April 1927.

Passengers
- FY2020: 1574 daily

Services
Preceding station	Tobu Railway	Following station
Kawamata TI08 towards Tōbu-Dōbutsu-Kōen	Isesaki Line Section Express Section Semi Express	Tatebayashi TI10 Terminus
Kawamata TI08 towards Tōbu-Dōbutsu-Kōen	Isesaki Line Local	Tatebayashi TI10 towards Isesaki
Location
- Location within Gunma Prefecture Location within Japan

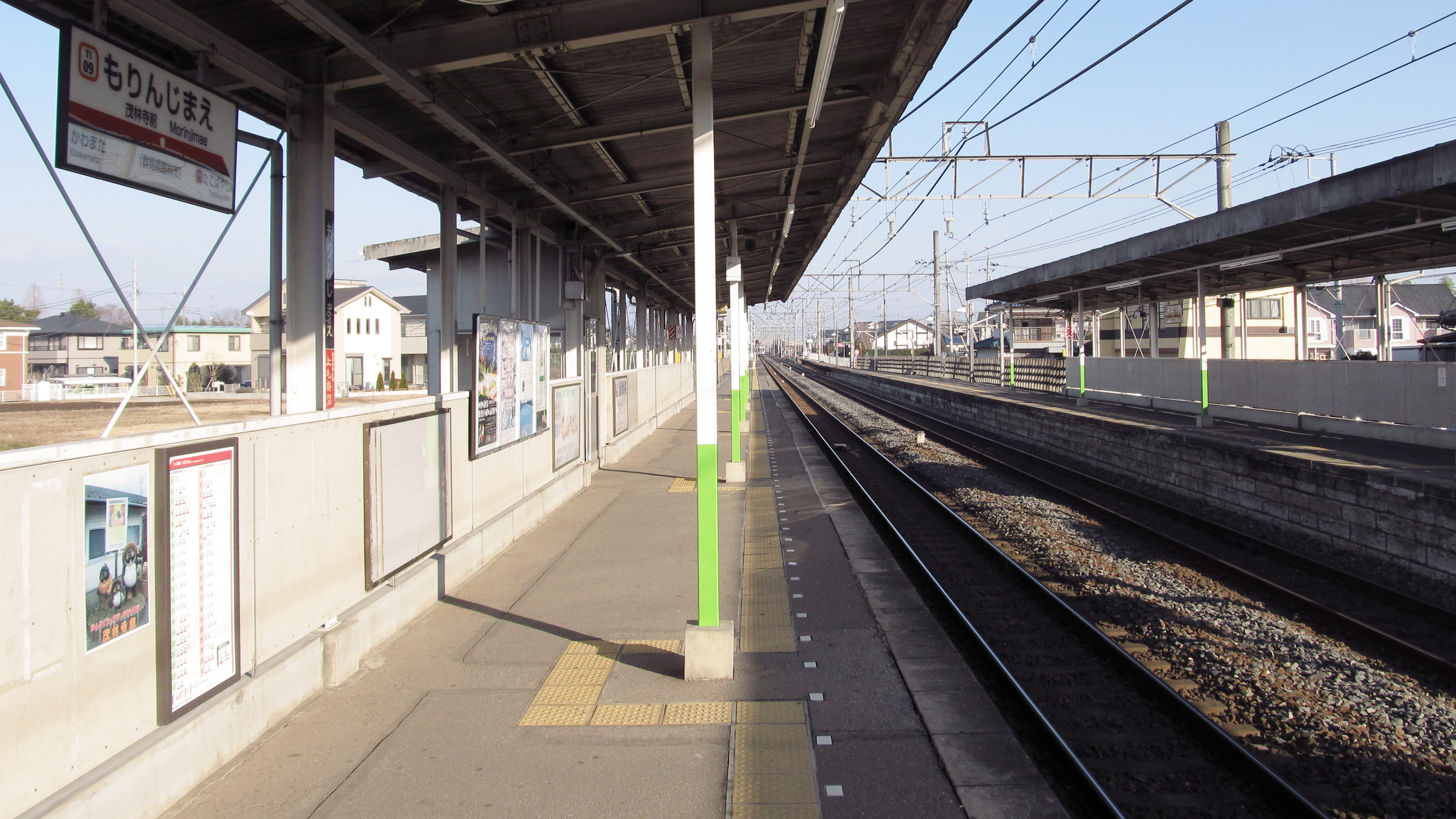
The platforms in December 2014

Morinjimae Station (茂林寺前駅, Myorinjimae-eki) is a passenger railway station in the city of Tatebayashi, Gunma, Japan, operated by the private railway operator Tōbu Railway.

== Lines ==
Morinjimae Station is served by the Tōbu Isesaki Line, and is located 72.4 kilometers from the terminus of the line at Asakusa.

== Station layout ==
The station has two opposed side platforms, connected to the station building by a footbridge.

=== Platforms ===
1	■ Tōbu Isesaki Line	for Kuki and Tōbu-Dōbutsu-Kōen
2	■ Tōbu Isesaki Line	for Tatebayashi, Ōta and Ashikaga

== History ==
Morinjimae Station opened on 1 April 1927.

From 17 March 2012, station numbering was introduced on all Tōbu lines, with Morinjimae Station becoming "TI-09".

== Passenger statistics ==
In fiscal 2019, the station was used by an average of 1574 passengers daily (boarding passengers only).

== Surrounding area ==
- Morinji Temple
- Morinji Numa (swamp)
- Yacho-no-mori flower garden
