= Tatebayashi, Gunma =

Tatebayashi 館林市
- City
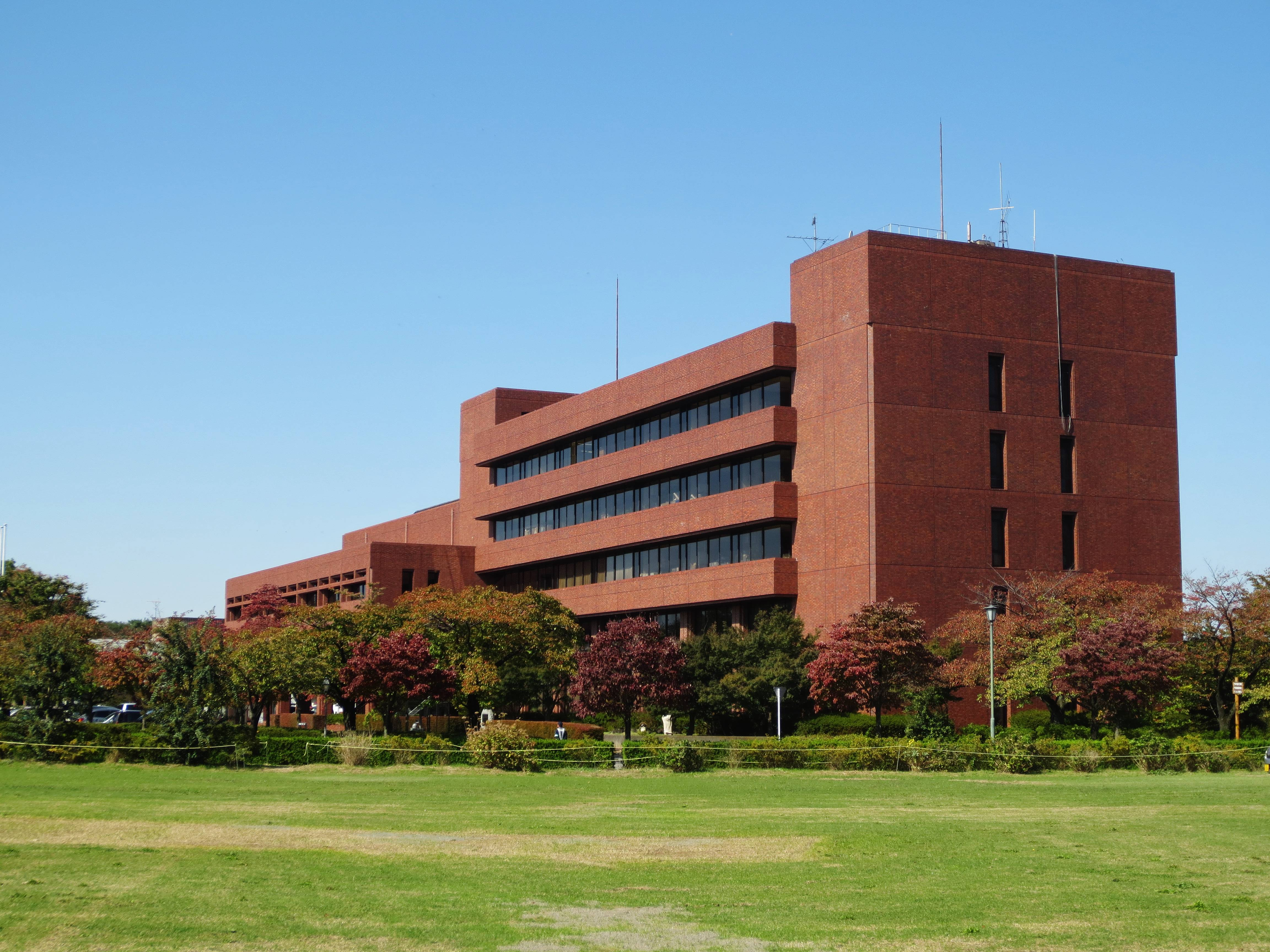
- Tatebayashi city hall

- Flag Emblem

- Location of Tatebayashi in Gunma Prefecture

- Coordinates: 36°14′41.4″N 139°32′31.6″E
- Country: Japan
- Region: Kantō
- Prefecture: Gunma

Government
  - Mayor: Tada Yoshihiro (since April 2021)

Area
  - Total: 60.97 km^{2} (23.54 sq mi)

Population (February 2024)
  - Total: 74,027
  - Density: 1,214/km^{2} (3,145/sq mi)
- Time zone: UTC+9 (Japan Standard Time)
- Phone number: 0276-72-4111
- Address: 1-1 Shiromachi, Tatebayashi-shi, Gunma-ken 374-8501
- Climate: Cfa
- Website: Official website
- Symbols
- Bird: Anas poecilorhyncha
- Flower: Rhododendron kaempferi
- Tree: Pinus thunbergii

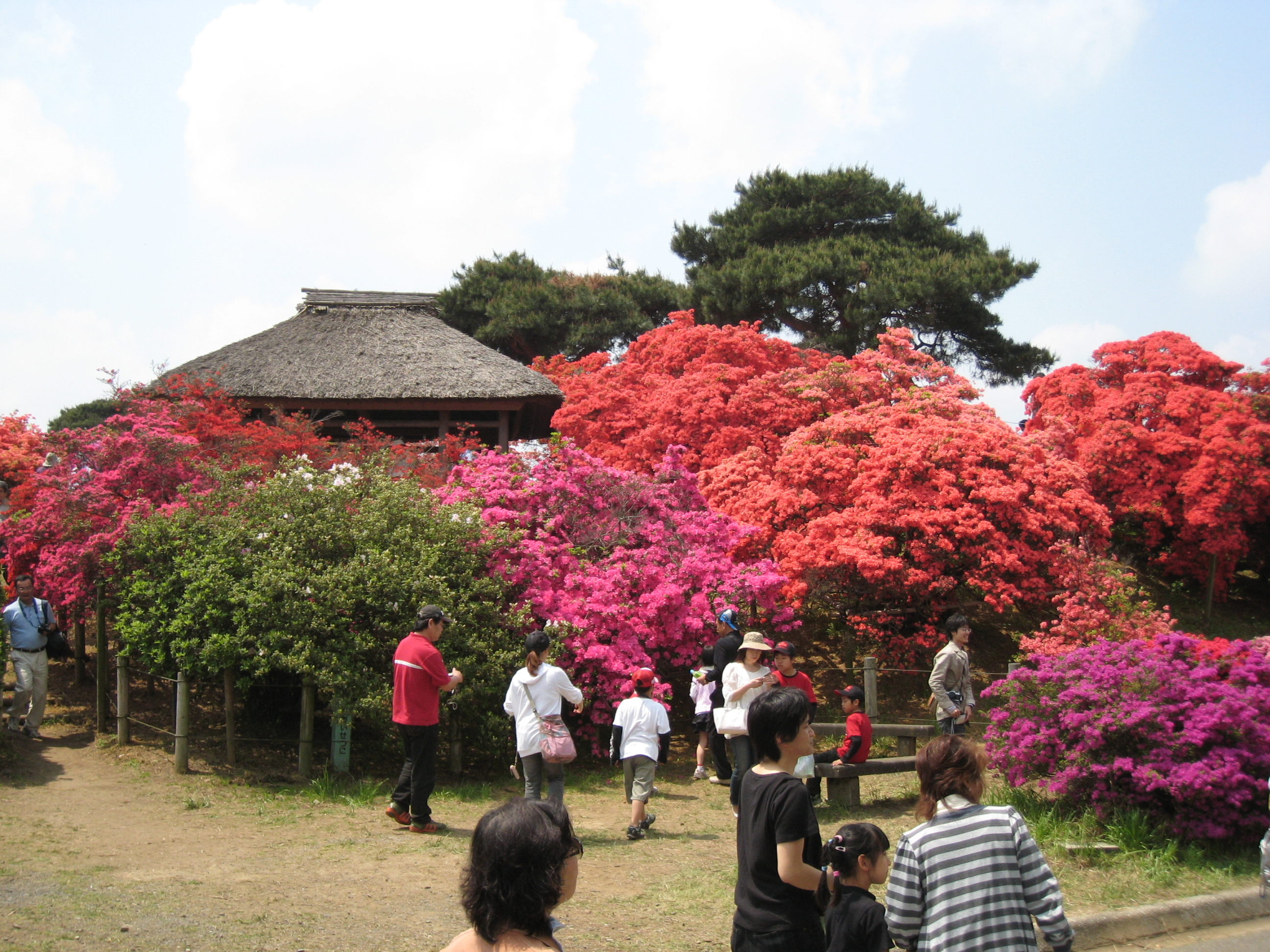
Tsutsujigaoka Koen, or Azalea Park in Tatebayashi

Tatebayashi (館林市, Tatebayashi-shi) is a city located in Gunma Prefecture, Japan. As of 1 February 2024, the city had an estimated population of 74,027 in 34,486 households, and a population density of 1200 people per km². The total area of the city is 60.97 square kilometres (23.54 sq mi). Tatebayashi is famous for Azalea Hill Park and Bunbuku Chagama of Morin-ji temple.

== Geography ==
Tatebayashi is located in the extreme southeastern portion of Gunma Prefecture in the Kantō Plains, bordered by Tochigi Prefecture to the north. The Tone River and Watarase Rivers sandwich the city to the north and south.

=== Surrounding municipalities ===
Gunma Prefecture

- Chiyoda
- Itakura
- Meiwa
- Ōra

Tochigi Prefecture

- Ashikaga
- Sano

=== Climate ===
Tatebayashi has a humid subtropical climate (Köppen Cfa) characterized by warm summers and cold winters with heavy snowfall. The average annual temperature in Tatebayashi is 14.5 °C. The average annual rainfall is 1287 mm with September as the wettest month. The temperatures are highest on average in August, at around 26.7 °C, and lowest in January, at around 3.3 °C.

Climate data for Tatebayashi City (1991−2020 normals, extremes 1979−present)
Month	Jan	Feb	Mar	Apr	May	Jun	Jul	Aug	Sep	Oct	Nov	Dec	Year
Record high °C (°F)	18.9 (66.0)	24.0 (75.2)	27.1 (80.8)	33.2 (91.8)	35.4 (95.7)	39.3 (102.7)	39.9 (103.8)	40.3 (104.5)	39.3 (102.7)	33.9 (93.0)	25.2 (77.4)	25.2 (77.4)	40.3 (104.5)
Mean daily maximum °C (°F)	9.6 (49.3)	10.6 (51.1)	14.3 (57.7)	20.2 (68.4)	24.8 (76.6)	27.4 (81.3)	31.2 (88.2)	32.7 (90.9)	28.3 (82.9)	22.4 (72.3)	16.8 (62.2)	11.8 (53.2)	20.8 (69.4)
Daily mean °C (°F)	4.0 (39.2)	4.9 (40.8)	8.5 (47.3)	14.0 (57.2)	18.9 (66.0)	22.4 (72.3)	26.1 (79.0)	27.3 (81.1)	23.4 (74.1)	17.6 (63.7)	11.5 (52.7)	6.2 (43.2)	15.4 (59.7)
Mean daily minimum °C (°F)	−0.7 (30.7)	0.1 (32.2)	3.4 (38.1)	8.6 (47.5)	14.0 (57.2)	18.5 (65.3)	22.4 (72.3)	23.5 (74.3)	19.8 (67.6)	13.7 (56.7)	6.9 (44.4)	1.5 (34.7)	11.0 (51.8)
Record low °C (°F)	−8.8 (16.2)	−7.0 (19.4)	−4.7 (23.5)	−1.0 (30.2)	3.6 (38.5)	11.0 (51.8)	14.6 (58.3)	15.9 (60.6)	10.2 (50.4)	2.8 (37.0)	−2.0 (28.4)	−5.9 (21.4)	−8.8 (16.2)
Average precipitation mm (inches)	37.2 (1.46)	34.2 (1.35)	70.1 (2.76)	84.6 (3.33)	114.2 (4.50)	142.3 (5.60)	158.6 (6.24)	143.9 (5.67)	167.9 (6.61)	160.6 (6.32)	56.0 (2.20)	33.0 (1.30)	1,202.6 (47.35)
Average precipitation days (≥ 1.0 mm)	3.8	4.4	8.3	8.9	10.3	12.1	12.6	9.6	11.8	9.7	6.0	3.8	101.2
Mean monthly sunshine hours	212.3	194.9	196.9	196.4	189.6	131.1	152.7	175.5	133.5	142.4	168.6	193.8	2,087.6
Source: Japan Meteorological Agency

== Demographics ==
Per Japanese census data, the population of Tatebayashi has recently plateaued after a long period of growth. There is a small community of around 200 Rohingya from Myanmar living in Tatebayashi.

Historical population
Year	Pop.	±%
1920	37,242	—
1930	41,629	+11.8%
1940	42,411	+1.9%
1950	55,510	+30.9%
1960	55,684	+0.3%
1970	61,130	+9.8%
1980	70,245	+14.9%
1990	76,221	+8.5%
2000	79,371	+4.1%
2010	78,608	−1.0%
2020	75,309	−4.2%

== History ==
Tatebayashi is located within traditional Kōzuke Province and has been settled since prehistoric times and there is a continuous record of habitation from the Japanese Paleolithic period 20,000 years ago. During the Edo period, the area of present-day Tatebayashi was a castle town and administrative center of Tatebayashi Domain, a feudal domain under the Tokugawa shogunate.

Tatebayashi Town was created within Ōra District, Gunma Prefecture on April 1, 1889 with the creation of the modern municipalities system after the Meiji Restoration. On April 1, 1954 the town of Tatebayashi and the villages of Satoya, Ōshima, Akabane, Rokugō, Minoya, Tatara, and Watarase merged to form the city Tatebayashi.

== Government ==
Tatebayashi has a mayor-council form of government with a directly elected mayor and a unicameral city council of 18 members. Tatebayashi contributes two members to the Gunma Prefectural Assembly. In terms of national politics, the city is part of Gunma 3rd district of the lower house of the Diet of Japan.

== Economy ==
Tatebayashi is a regional commercial center and transportation hub. Food processing dominates the manufacturing sector of the local economy.

== Education ==
Tatebayashi has 11 public elementary schools and five public middle schools operated by the city government, and two public high schools operated by the Gunma Prefectural Board of Education. There is also one private high school.

=== University ===
  - Kanto Junior College

== Transportation ==
=== Railway ===
- Tōbu Railway Isesaki Line
  - Morinjimae – Tatebayashi – Tatara
- Tōbu Railway Sano Line
  - Tatebayashi – Watarase
- Tōbu Railway Koizumi Line
  - Tatebayashi – Narushima

=== Highway ===
- Tōhoku Expressway – Tatebayashi Interchange
- National Route 122
- National Route 354

== Local attractions ==
- Gunma Museum of Art
- Jō-numa marsh
- Moriniji Temple
- Site of Tatebayashi Castle
- Tatara-numa marsh
- Tsutsujigaoka Park, a National Place of Scenic Beauty

== Sister cities ==
- Maroochy Shire Council, Australia, since July 1996
- Kunshan, China, friendship city since 2004

== Notable people ==
- Shinji Kasahara, actor
- Chiaki Mukai, astronaut and doctor
- Kenjiro Shoda, mathematician
- Katai Tayama, novelist
