= Tatsuya Ozeki =

Japanese baseball player and coach (born 1976)

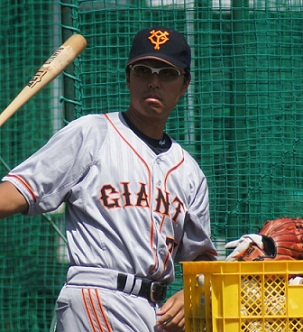

Saitama Seibu Lions – No. 79
- Outfielder / Coach
- Born: July 24, 1976 (age 49); Sano, Tochigi, Japan
- Batted: Left Threw: Left

NPB debut
- October 14, 1996, for the Seibu Lions

Last NPB appearance
- August 19, 2008, for the Yokohama BayStars

NPB statistics (through 2008)
- Batting average: .276
- Home runs: 18
- Hits: 806

Teams
- As player: Seibu Lions (1995–2005); Yomiuri Giants (2006–2007); Yokohama BayStars (2008); As coach: Yomiuri Giants (2011–2018); Saitama Seibu Lions (2020–)

Career highlights and awards
- 1998 Pacific League Rookie of the Year; 1× Best Nine Award (2002); 1× Mitsui Golden Glove Award (2002)

Tatsuya Ozeki (小関 竜也, Ozeki Tatsuya; born July 24, 1976 in Sano, Tochigi, Japan) is a professional Japanese baseball player.

Mai Ozeki, his daughter, was one of the members of female idol group Country Girls.
