= Tanuma, Tochigi =

Dissolved municipality in Tochigi prefecture, Japan

Coordinates: 36°22′N 139°35′E

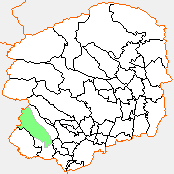
Map of Tanuma, Tochigi

Tanuma (田沼町, Tanuma-machi) was a town located in Aso District, Tochigi Prefecture, Japan.

As of 2003, the town had an estimated population of 28,904 and a density of 160.54 persons per km^{2}. The total area was 180.04 km^{2}.

On February 28, 2005, Tanuma, along with the town of Kuzu (also from Aso District), was merged into the expanded city of Sano.

Tanuma was on the JR line and could be accessed easily.
