= Kuzu, Tochigi =

Town in Japan

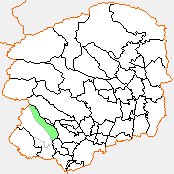
Map of Kuzu, Tochigi

Kuzū (葛生町, Kuzū-machi) was a town located in Aso District, Tochigi Prefecture, Japan.

As of 2003, the town had an estimated population of 12,011 and a density of 131.04 persons per km^{2}. The total area was 91.66 km^{2}.

On February 28, 2005, Kuzū, along with the town of Tanuma (also from Aso District), was merged into the expanded city of Sano.
