= Sano, Tochigi =

Sano 佐野市
- City
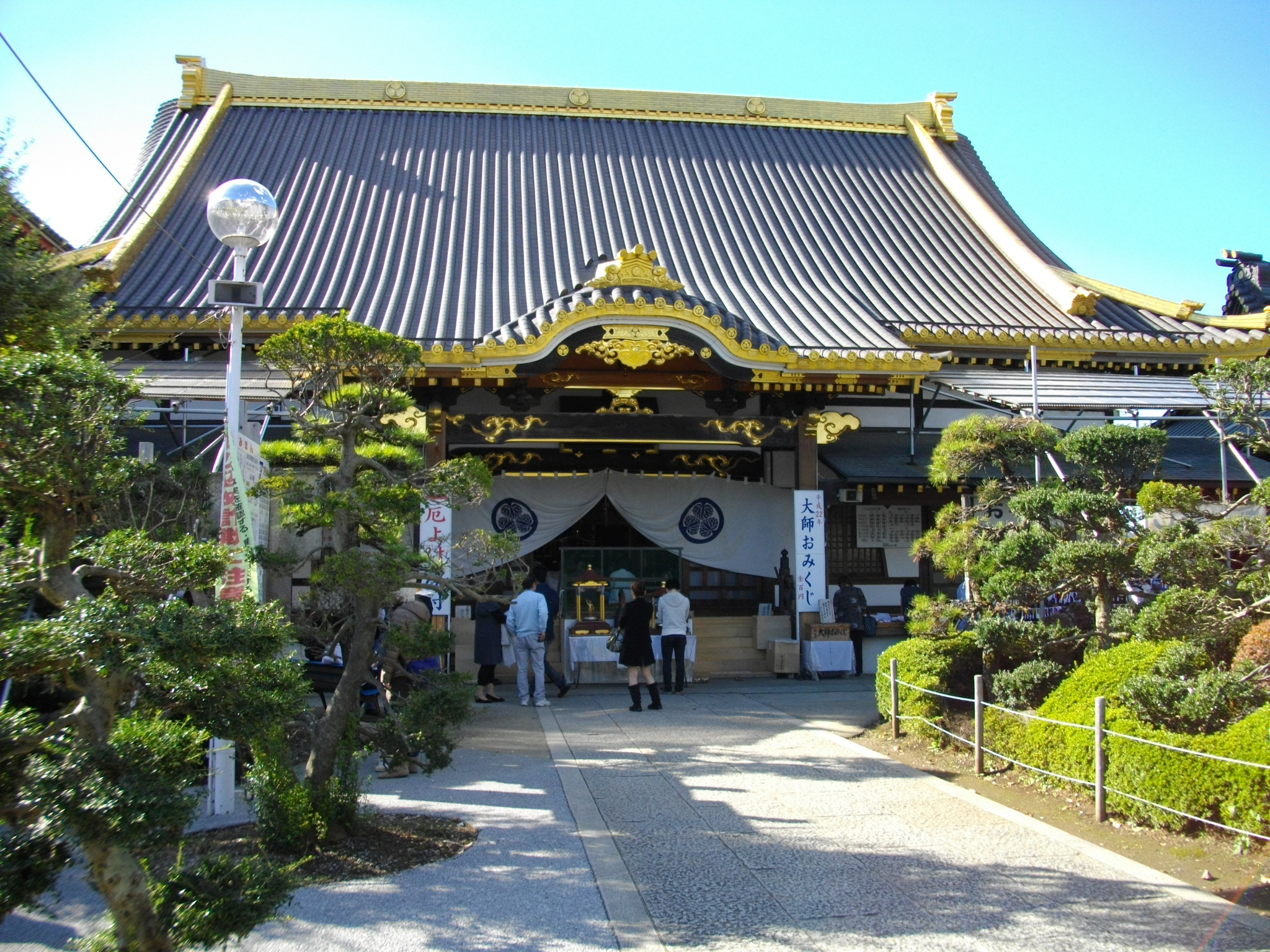
- Soshu-ji

- Flag Seal

- Location of Sano in Tochigi Prefecture

- Coordinates: 36°18′52.2″N 139°34′42″E
- Country: Japan
- Region: Kantō
- Prefecture: Tochigi
- First official recorded: 940 AD (official confirmed)
- City settled: April 1, 1943

Government
  - Mayor: Yutaka Kaneko (金子裕) - from April 2021

Area
  - Total: 356.04 km^{2} (137.47 sq mi)

Population (August 2020)
  - Total: 117,669
  - Density: 330.49/km^{2} (855.97/sq mi)
- Time zone: UTC+9 (Japan Standard Time)
- Phone number: 0283-24-5111
- Address: 1, Takasagochō, Sano-shi, Tochigi-ken 327-0022
- Climate: Cfa
- Website: Official website
- Symbols
- Bird: Mandarin Duck
- Flower: Katakuri
- Tree: Pine

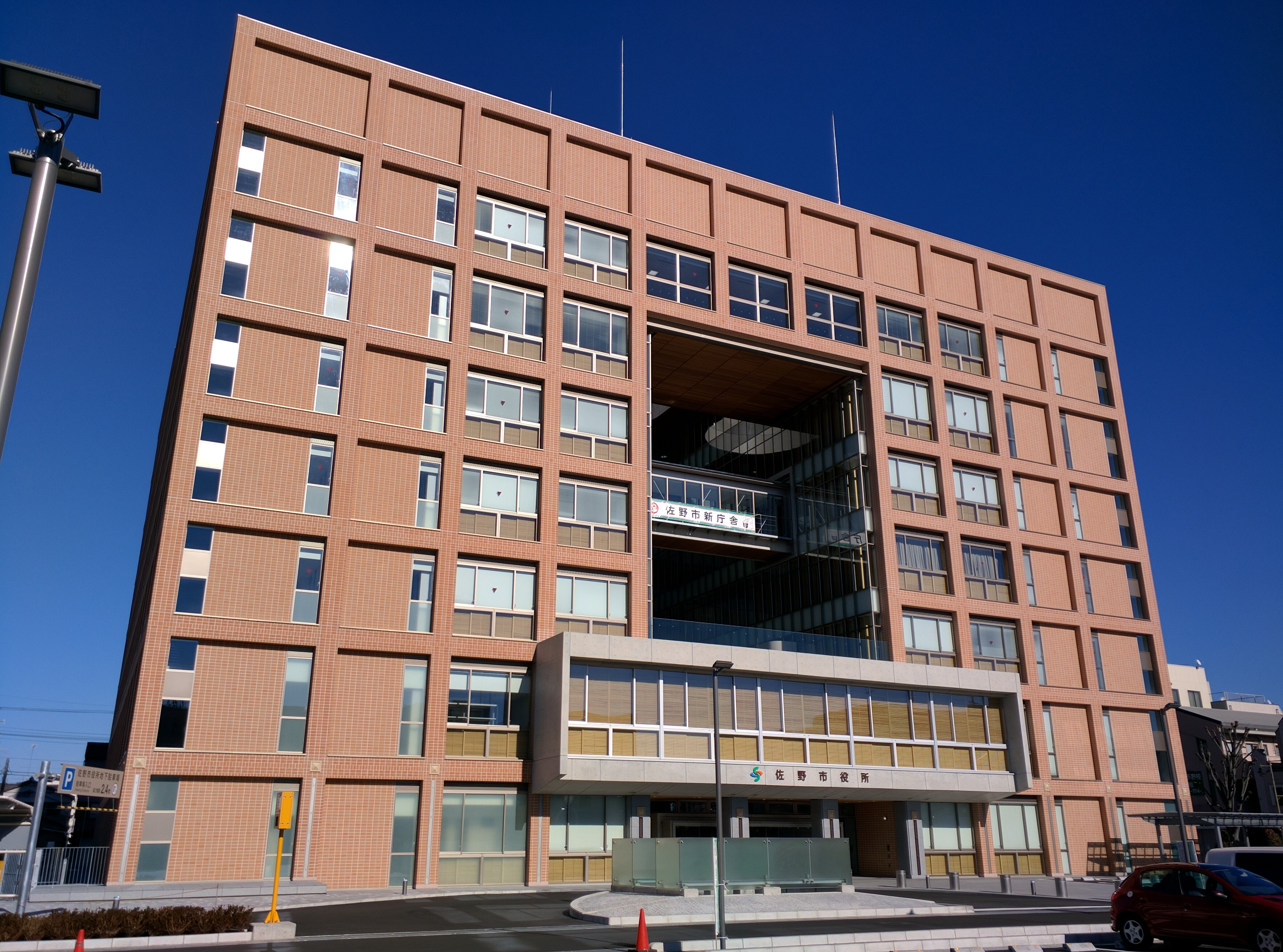
Sano City Hall

Sano (佐野市, Sano-shi) is a city located in Tochigi Prefecture, Japan. As of 1 August 2020, the city had an estimated population of 117,669, in 52,066 households and a population density of 330 persons per km^{2}. The total area of the city is 356.04 square kilometres (137.47 sq mi). The city is known for its outlet mall, Sano Yakuyoke Daishi Temple, and its local variety of ramen, Sano ramen. More recently, Sano has gained international recognition for being the home of cricket in Japan.

== Geography ==
Sano is located in the northern Kantō plain, in southwestern Tochigi Prefecture, bordered by Gunma Prefecture to the west. The location river boundary connected by Tochigi.

=== Surrounding municipalities ===
Gunma Prefecture

- Itakura
- Kiryū
- Midori
- Tatebayashi

Tochigi Prefecture

- Ashikaga
- Kanuma
- Tochigi

=== Climate ===
Sano has a humid subtropical climate (Köppen Cfa) characterized by warm summers and cold winters with heavy snowfall. The average annual temperature in Sano is 14.5 °C (58.1 °F). The average annual rainfall is 1,258.0 mm (49.53 in) with July as the wettest month. The temperatures are highest on average in August, at around 26.3 °C (79.3 °F), and lowest in January, at around 3.2 °C (37.8 °F).

Climate data for Sano (1991−2020 normals, extremes 1978−present)
Month	Jan	Feb	Mar	Apr	May	Jun	Jul	Aug	Sep	Oct	Nov	Dec	Year
Record high °C (°F)	20.0 (68.0)	23.1 (73.6)	26.6 (79.9)	31.2 (88.2)	35.7 (96.3)	38.4 (101.1)	41.0 (105.8)	39.8 (103.6)	37.1 (98.8)	34.3 (93.7)	25.1 (77.2)	25.2 (77.4)	41.0 (105.8)
Mean daily maximum °C (°F)	9.4 (48.9)	10.3 (50.5)	13.7 (56.7)	19.3 (66.7)	24.0 (75.2)	26.6 (79.9)	30.1 (86.2)	31.5 (88.7)	27.5 (81.5)	21.9 (71.4)	16.5 (61.7)	11.6 (52.9)	20.2 (68.4)
Daily mean °C (°F)	3.2 (37.8)	4.0 (39.2)	7.6 (45.7)	12.9 (55.2)	17.9 (64.2)	21.6 (70.9)	25.2 (77.4)	26.3 (79.3)	22.5 (72.5)	16.7 (62.1)	10.5 (50.9)	5.3 (41.5)	14.5 (58.1)
Mean daily minimum °C (°F)	−2.5 (27.5)	−1.8 (28.8)	1.6 (34.9)	6.8 (44.2)	12.3 (54.1)	17.4 (63.3)	21.4 (70.5)	22.3 (72.1)	18.6 (65.5)	12.3 (54.1)	5.2 (41.4)	−0.2 (31.6)	9.5 (49.0)
Record low °C (°F)	−10.2 (13.6)	−10.2 (13.6)	−6.6 (20.1)	−4.1 (24.6)	1.0 (33.8)	7.9 (46.2)	14.2 (57.6)	12.8 (55.0)	7.5 (45.5)	1.1 (34.0)	−3.1 (26.4)	−7.0 (19.4)	−10.2 (13.6)
Average precipitation mm (inches)	35.1 (1.38)	33.4 (1.31)	69.4 (2.73)	90.5 (3.56)	114.8 (4.52)	145.2 (5.72)	185.0 (7.28)	162.2 (6.39)	176.5 (6.95)	160.6 (6.32)	57.8 (2.28)	31.0 (1.22)	1,258 (49.53)
Average precipitation days (≥ 1.0 mm)	3.7	4.7	8.5	9.4	10.7	13.3	13.9	11.3	11.8	10.0	6.3	3.9	107.5
Mean monthly sunshine hours	217.7	200.7	205.0	196.0	181.6	129.4	135.6	166.6	135.0	147.0	172.1	199.4	2,084
Source 1: 理科年表
Source 2: Japan Meteorological Agency (Averages: 1981-2010; Peaks: 1978–present)

=== Demographics ===
Per Japanese census data, the population of Sano peaked around 1990 and has declined since.

Historical population
Year	Pop.	±%
1920	89,102	—
1930	92,570	+3.9%
1940	95,520	+3.2%
1950	120,541	+26.2%
1960	118,046	−2.1%
1970	118,083	+0.0%
1980	124,331	+5.3%
1990	128,276	+3.2%
2000	125,671	−2.0%
2010	121,259	−3.5%
2020	116,228	−4.1%

== History ==
During the Edo period, Sano was a castle town and the seat of the daimyō of Sano Domain. Following the Meiji Restoration, the town of Sano was created within Aso District, Tochigi with the establishment of the modern municipalities system on April 1, 1889. Sano was elevated to city status on April 1, 1943, when it merged with the neighboring towns of Inubushi and Horigome and the villages of Sakai and Hatagawa. The city annexed the village of Inazuma (from Ashikaga District) on January 1, 1955, followed by the town of Akami(from Aso District) on April 1, 1955.

On February 28, 2005, Sano absorbed the towns of Kuzu and Tanuma (both from Aso District).

== Government ==
Sano has a mayor-council form of government with a directly elected mayor and a unicameral city legislature of 26 members. Sano contributes three members to the Tochigi Prefectural Assembly. In terms of national politics, the city is part of Tochigi 5th district of the lower house of the Diet of Japan.

== Economy ==
Agriculture and light manufacturing are mainstays of the local economy, with production of Kanpyō, turmeric and spinach being prominent local crops. The city is increasingly a commuter town for neighboring Utsunomiya.

== Education ==
- Sano College
- Sano also has 26 public primary schools and 11 public middle schools operated by the city government. The city has three public high schools operated by the Tochigi Prefectural Board of Education. The prefecture also operates one middle school. There is also three private high schools.

== Sports ==
Sano has become the headquarter of the Japan Cricket Association and has hosted a number of cricket matches between international teams. On 22 March 2016, it was announced that Sano would be home to the Sano International Cricket Ground, which will become Japan's first dedicated cricketing venue built for purpose which no longer has to compete with other sports for usage.

== Transportation ==
=== Railway ===
JR East – Ryōmō Line

- Sano

Tōbu Railway – Tōbu Sano Line

- Tajima - Sanoshi - Sano - Horigome - Yoshimizu - Tanuma - Tada - Kuzū

=== Highway ===
- Tōhoku Expressway – Sano-Fujioka Interchange, Sano Service Area and Smart Interchange
- Kita-Kantō Expressway – Izuruhara Parking Area, Sano-Tanuma Interchange
- National Route 50
- National Route 293

=== Bus ===
- Sano Shintoshi Bus Terminal

== Local attractions ==
- house of Shōzō Tanaka
- site of Sano Castle

== International relations ==
- Lancaster, Pennsylvania, United States
- Quzhou, China, friendship city since 1997

== Notable people from Sano ==
- Takuro Ishii, professional baseball player
- Shunsuke Ishikawa, professional baseball player
- Kyogo Kawaguchi, singer-songwriter
- Tatsuya Ozeki, professional baseball player
- Shōzō Tanaka, politician, social activist
