= Tatebayashi Station =

Railway station in Tatebayashi, Gunma Prefecture, Japan

TI10 Tatebayashi Station 館林駅
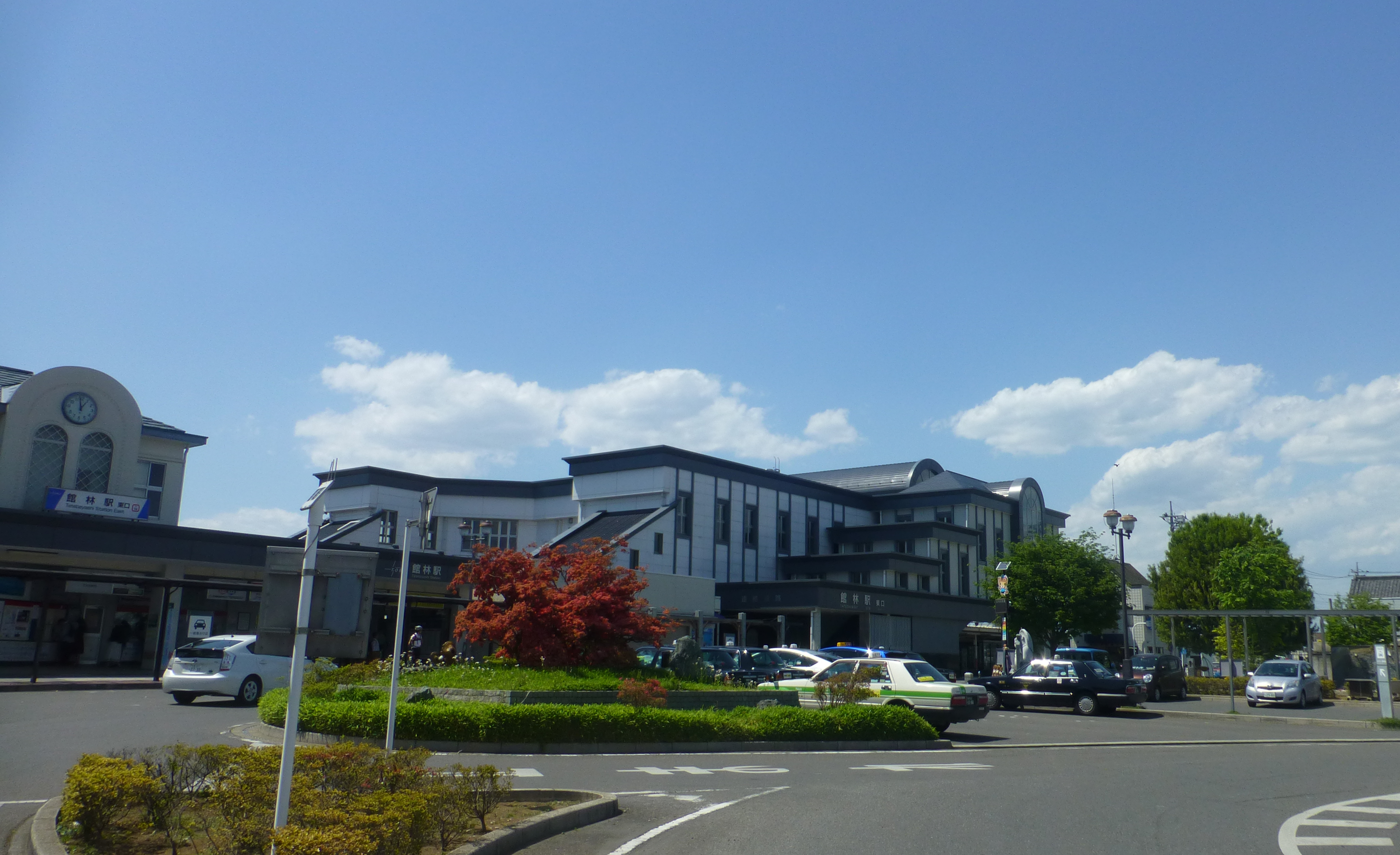
- Tatebayashi Station building, April 2016

General information
- Location: 2-1-1 Honchō, Tatebayashi-shi, Gunma-ken 374–0024; Japan
- Coordinates: 36.2465°N 139.5278°E
- Operator: Tōbu Railway
- Lines: Tōbu Isesaki Line; Tōbu Sano Line; Tōbu Koizumi Line
- Distance: 74.6 km from Asakusa
- Platforms: 1 island + 1 side + 1 bay platform

Other information
- Station code: TI-10
- Website: Official website

History
- Opened: 27 August 1907
- Former names: Nakano (until 1937)

Passengers
- FY2019: 11,036 daily

Services
Preceding station	Tobu Railway	Following station
Hanyū TI07 towards Asakusa	Ryomo	Ashikagashi TI15 towards Akagi or Isesaki
Hanyū TI07 towards Asakusa	Ryomo	Sanoshi TI33 towards Kuzū
Morinjimae TI09 towards Tōbu-Dōbutsu-Kōen	Isesaki Line Section Express Section Semi Express	Terminus
Morinjimae TI09 towards Tōbu-Dōbutsu-Kōen	Isesaki Line Local	Tatara TI11 towards Isesaki
Terminus	Koizumi Line	Narushima TI41 towards Nishi-Koizumi
Terminus	Sano Line	Watarase TI31 towards Kuzū
Location
- Location within Gunma Prefecture Location within Japan

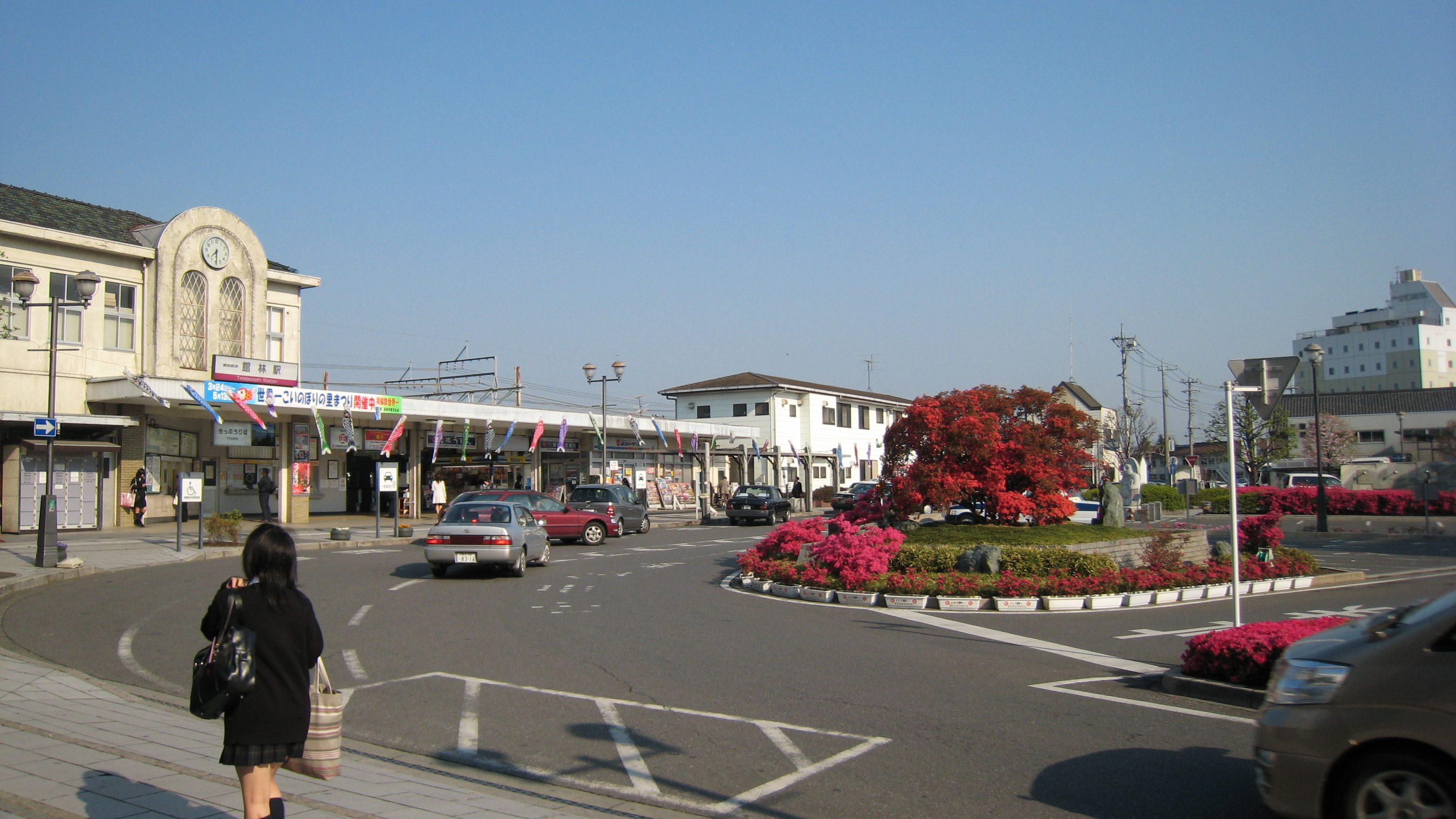
Station forecourt, 2007

Tatebayashi Station (館林駅, Tatebayashi-eki) is a junction passenger railway station in the city of Tatebayashi, Gunma, Japan, operated by the private railway operator Tōbu Railway.

== Lines ==
Tatebayashi Station is served by the Tōbu Isesaki Line, and is located 74.6 km from the line's Tokyo terminus at Asakusa. It is also the terminal station for the Tōbu Koizumi Line and Tōbu Sano Line.

== Platforms ==
The stations one island platform, one side platform and one bay platform connected by the station building located above.

1	■ Tōbu Sano Line	for Sano and Kuzū (Local)
2	■ Tōbu Isesaki Line	for Kuki, Tōbu-Dōbutsu-Kōen, Kasukabe, Kita-Senju, and Asakusa
3	■ Tōbu Isesaki Line	for Ashikagashi, Ōta, Isesaki , and Akagi
3	■ Tōbu Sano Line	for Sano and Kuzū (Express)
4	■ Tōbu Koizumi Line	for Narushima, Hon-Nakano, and Nishi-Koizumi
5	■ Extra platform	-

Ryōmō trains on the Sano Line that start at Kuzū arrive at platform 5. At those times, the trains from Ōta waits at platform 2.

== History ==
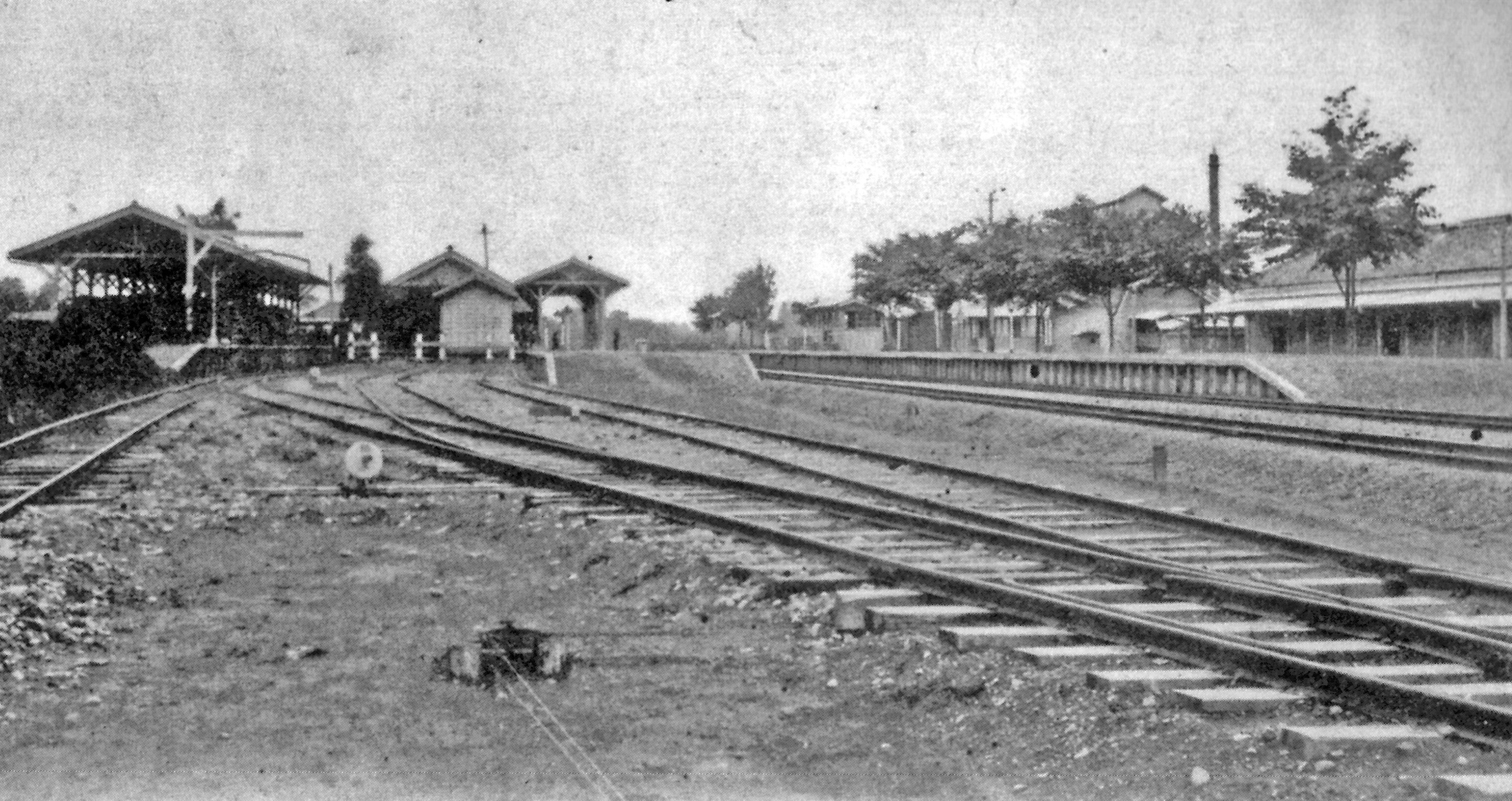
Tatebayashi Station circa 1910

The station opened as Nakano Station (中野駅) on 27 August 1907. It was renamed Tatebayashi on 1 March 1937.

From 17 March 2012, station numbering was introduced on all Tōbu lines, with Tatebayashi Station becoming "TI-10".

== Passenger statistics ==
In fiscal 2019, the station was used by an average of 11,046 passengers daily (boarding passengers only).

== Surrounding area ==
- Syoda Soy Sauce Memorial Museum

== See also ==
- List of railway stations in Japan
