= Kuzū Station =

Railway station in Sano, Tochigi Prefecture, Japan

TI39 Kuzū Station 葛生駅
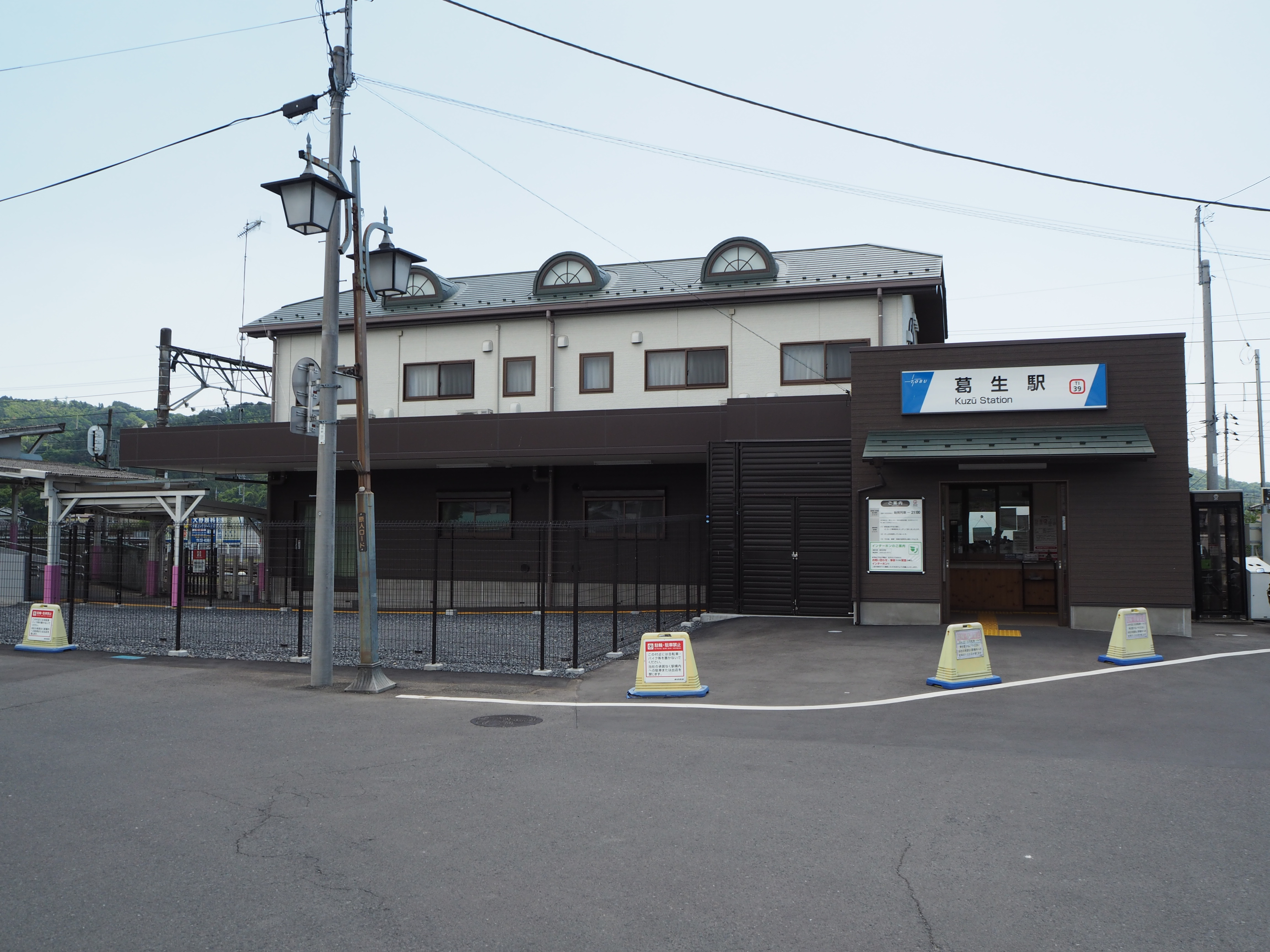
- Kuzū Station in May 2016

General information
- Location: Kuzū-Higashi 1-chome, Sano-shi, Tochigi-ken 327-0501; Japan
- Coordinates: 36.3980°N 139.6093°E
- Operator: Tōbu Railway
- Line: Tōbu Sano Line
- Distance: 22.1 km from Tatebayashi
- Platforms: 1 side platform

Other information
- Station code: TI-39
- Website: Official website

History
- Opened: 23 March 1894

Passengers
- FY2020: 936 daily

Services
Preceding station	Tobu Railway	Following station
Tanuma TI37 towards Asakusa	Ryomo	Terminus
Tada TI38 towards Tatebayashi	Sano Line	Terminus
Location
- Location within Tochigi Prefecture Location within Japan

Kuzū Station (葛生駅, Kuzū-eki) is a railway station in the city of Sano, Tochigi, Japan, operated by the private railway operator Tōbu Railway. The station is numbered "TI-39".

== Lines ==
Kuzū Station is a terminal station of the Tōbu Sano Line, and is located 22.1 km from the opposing terminus of the line at Tatebayashi.

== Station layout ==
Kuzū Station consists of a single dead-headed side platform.

== History ==
Kuzū Station opened on 23 March 1894. From 17 March 2012, station numbering was introduced on all Tōbu lines, with Kuzū Station becoming "TI-39". A new station building was completed in September 2014.

== Passenger statistics ==
In fiscal 2019, the station was used by an average of 936 passengers daily (boarding passengers only).

== Surrounding area ==
- Former Kuzū Town Hall
- Kuzū Post Office
- National Route 293

== See also ==
- List of railway stations in Japan
