= Koizumi Station =

Koizumi Station is the name of several train stations in Japan:

- Koizumi Station (Ehime) (古泉駅) - Masaki, Iyo District, Ehime Prefecture
- Koizumi Station (Gifu) (小泉駅) - Tajimi, Gifu Prefecture
- Rikuzen-Koizumi Station (陸前小泉駅) - Motoyoshi, Motoyoshi District, Miyagi Prefecture
- Kai-Koizumi Station (甲斐小泉駅) - Hokuto, Yamanashi Prefecture
- Yamato-Koizumi Station (大和小泉駅) - Yamatokoriyama, Nara Prefecture
- Nishi-Koizumi Station (西小泉駅), Koizumimachi Station (小泉町駅), Higashi-Koizumi Station (東小泉駅) - Oizumi, Ora District, Gunma Prefecture
- Koizumicho Station (小泉町駅) - Toyama, Toyama Prefecture
