= Kobugannon Station =

Railway station in Japan

Kobugannon Station (瘤観音駅, Kobugannon-eki) was a railway station on the Koizumi Line in Ōra, Ōra District, Gunma, Japan, which was operated by the private railway operator Tobu Railway.

== History ==
The station opened on August 28, 1931, as a station on the Koizumi Line, then operated by the Joshu Railway.

Kobugannon Station closed together with Mujinazuka Station on December 25, 1941, after the Koizumi Line was purchased by Tobu Railway in 1937.

== Adjacent stations ==
Shinozuka Station - Kobugannon Station - Higashi-Koizumi Station

== Surrounding area ==
- Kobugannon Myōgen-ji Temple (こぶ観音明言寺) at coordinates 36.266534°N 139.44014°E
