= Mujinazuka Station =

Railway station in Japan

Coordinates: 36.2478°N 139.4892°E

Mujinazuka Station (狸塚駅, Mujinazuka-eki) was a railway station on the Koizumi Line in Ōra, Ōra District, Gunma, Japan, which was operated by the private railway operator Tobu Railway.

== History ==
The station opened on March 1, 1933, as a station on the Koizumi Line, then operated by the Joshu Railway.

Mujinazuka Station (between Narushima Station and Hon-Nakano Station), as well as Kobugannon Station, closed on December 25, 1941, after the Koizumi Line was purchased by Tobu Railway in 1937.
