= Running in board =

Large name sign on railway station platform

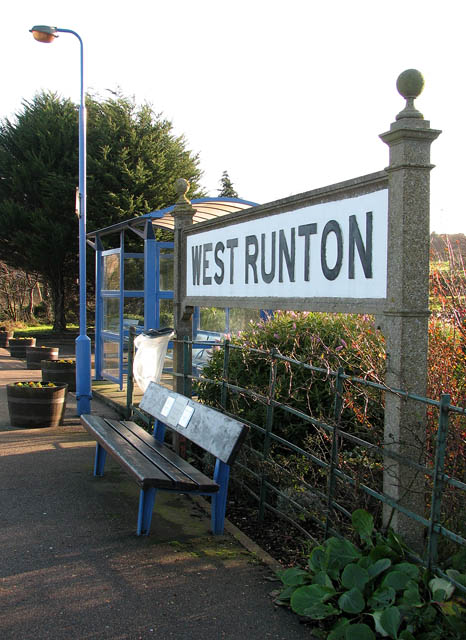
A running in board at West Runton railway station

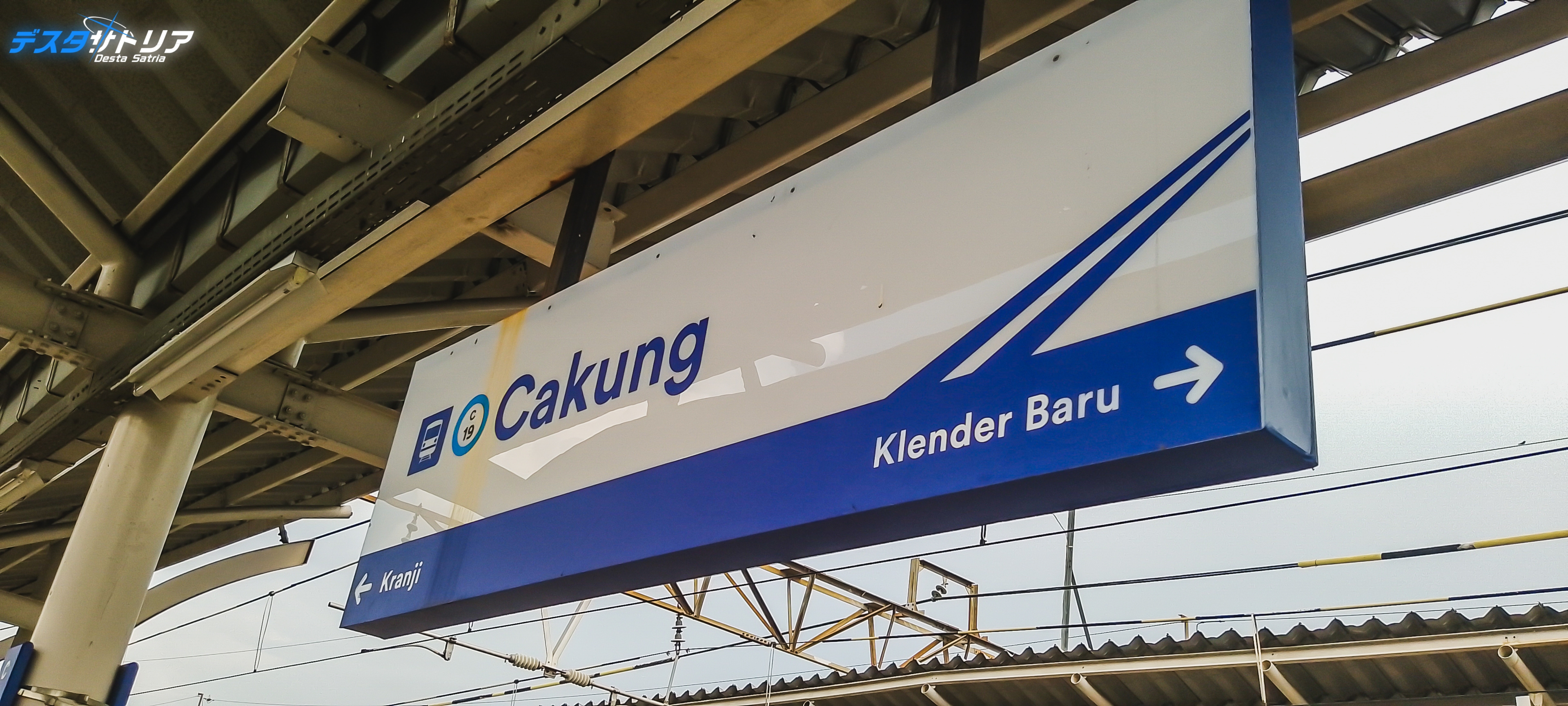
Cakung station board

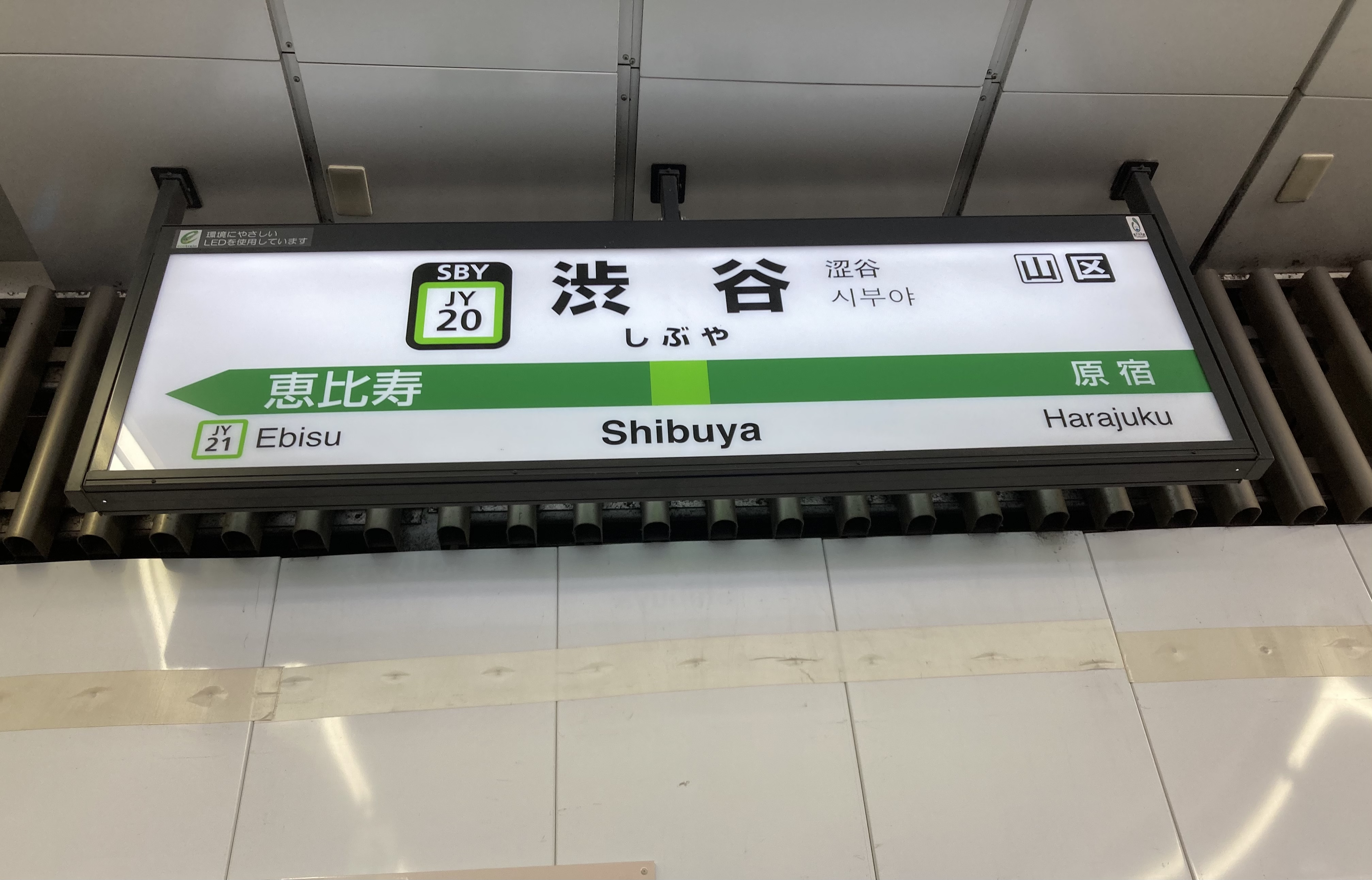
A hanging-style running in board at Shibuya Station on the JR East Yamanote Line. (Note: The station name "Shibuya" is written in Japanese (kanji and hiragana), English, Simplified Chinese, and Korean in the center, with the names of the neighboring stations, "Ebisu" and "Harajuku," displayed on either end. The green band represents the corporate color of JR East, and the light green color in the center represents the Yamanote Line’s line color. The notch in the band indicates the direction of travel. "JY20" is the station number for Shibuya, and "SBY" is its three-letter station code.)

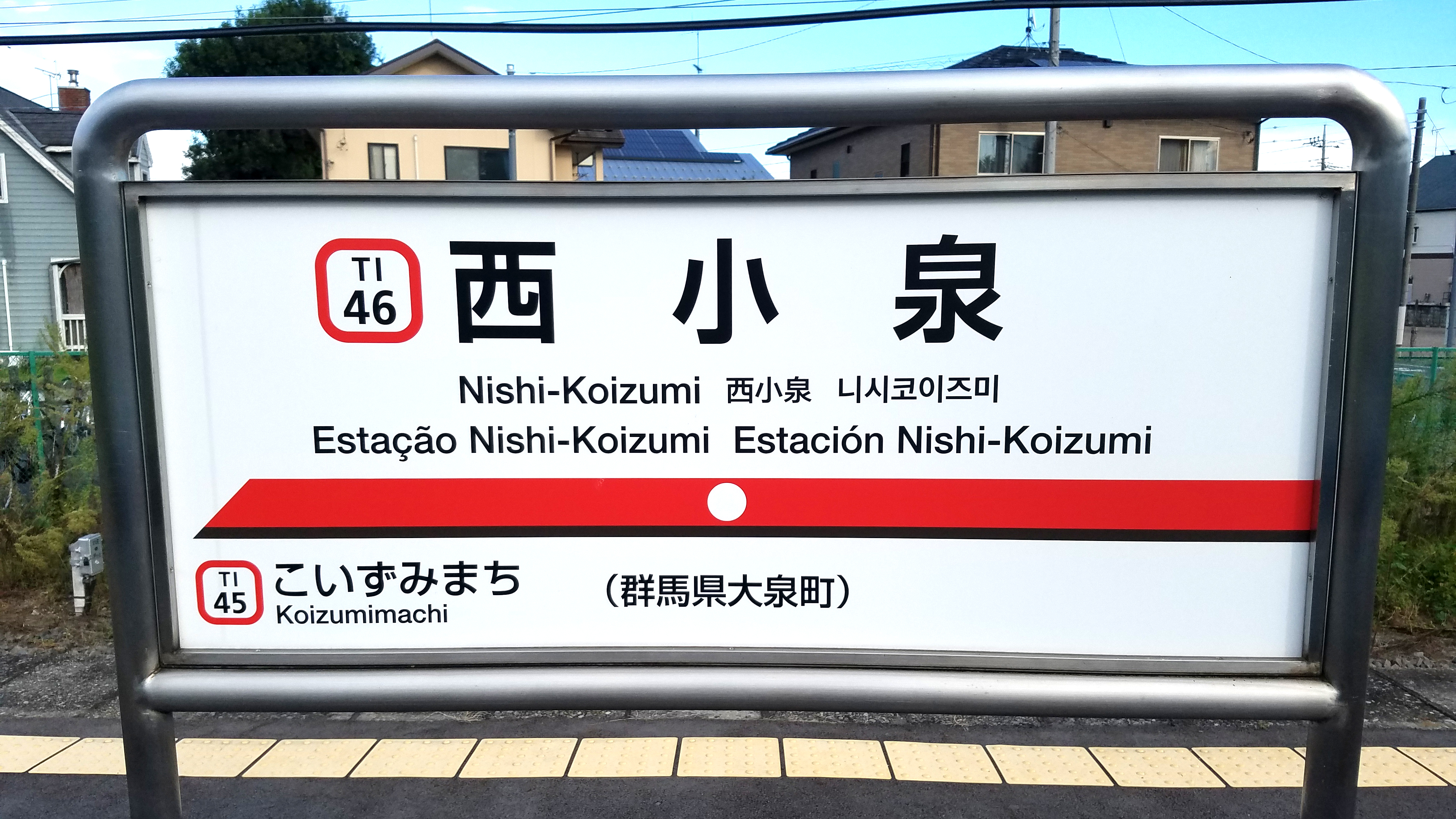
The station name sign at Nishi-Koizumi Station on the Tobu Koizumi Line. (Note: The running in board includes the station name in Japanese, English, Simplified Chinese, and Korean, as well as in Portuguese and Spanish due to the large population of Brazilian and Peruvian residents in the area.)

In British English, a running in board is a large sign showing the name of the railway station on which it is found. The signs are intended to inform passengers of their location when on a train entering the station, possibly while still moving at speed. Some signs display the names of the previous and following stations on the line.

In normal circumstances, a two-platform station has one running in board on each platform, situated near the end of the platform at which trains serving that platform run in, hence "running in board".

During the Second World War, running in boards and station signs in the United Kingdom were removed or obscured to prevent enemy spies or paratroopers from easily discovering their location.

== Japan ==
In Japan, running in boards (駅名標, ekimeihyō) generally follow a design principle where the name of the current station is prominently displayed in the center, while the names of the neighboring stations are shown in smaller text to the left and right.

During the era of Japanese National Railways (JNR), a standardized typeface known as Sumi Maru Gothic (スミ丸ゴシック体, Sumi Maru Goshikku-tai) was established. After the privatization and breakup of JNR, the rights to this typeface were transferred to JR Central. It is used on running in boards mounted on pillars in JR Hokkaido, and a slightly modified version is also used by JR Central.

After the privatization, each JR company began adopting its own style for running in boards. JR Central retained the basic JNR-era design but began adding an orange band—its corporate color—under the romanized name of the station on non-Shinkansen lines starting in November 1987. Other JR companies followed suit in the mid-1990s by introducing their own designs that included colored bands.

Many running in boards, both of JR and private railway companies, feature colored bands representing the company or line, combined with directional arrows to indicate train movement, or branch lines to signify junction stations. JR Central's non-Shinkansen lines, JR Shikoku, JR Kyushu, and Tobu Railway continue the JNR-era practice of including the station’s location (such as the prefecture or municipality) on the signs.

Historically, station names were primarily written in hiragana on running in boards from the Meiji period onward. However, some boards began displaying kanji more prominently for improved readability. JR West and JR Shikoku have adopted kanji-centered designs, and even JR East, which originally emphasized hiragana, is now shifting to designs that feature larger kanji characters in the Tokyo metropolitan and regional urban areas. Additionally, multilingual signage has become more common, with Chinese and Korean often included. In areas with large populations of South American residents, such as Brazilians and Peruvians, Portuguese and Spanish are sometimes also added.
