= Kokaiharamae No.1 Kofun =

Kofun period burial mound in Gunma, Japan

- 古海原前１号古墳 (Japanese)
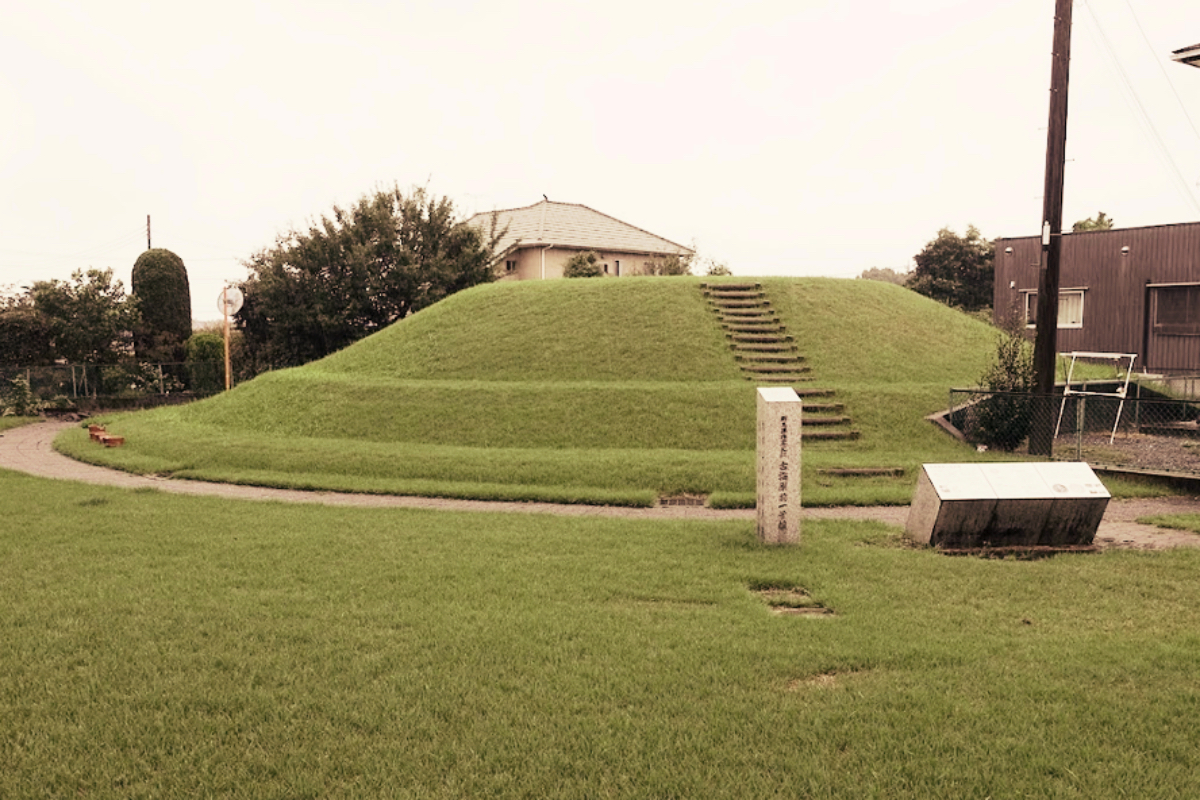
- Kokaiharamae No.1 Kofun

- Kokaiharamae No.1 Kofun Kokaiharamae No.1 Kofun (Japan)
- 36°13′34″N 139°24′50″E
- Type: Kofun
- Periods: Kofun period
- Location: Kokai-cho, Ōizumi, Gunma
- Region: Kantō region

History
- Built: late 5th - early 6th century

Site notes
- Public access: Yes (park)
- Gunma Prefecture Historic Site

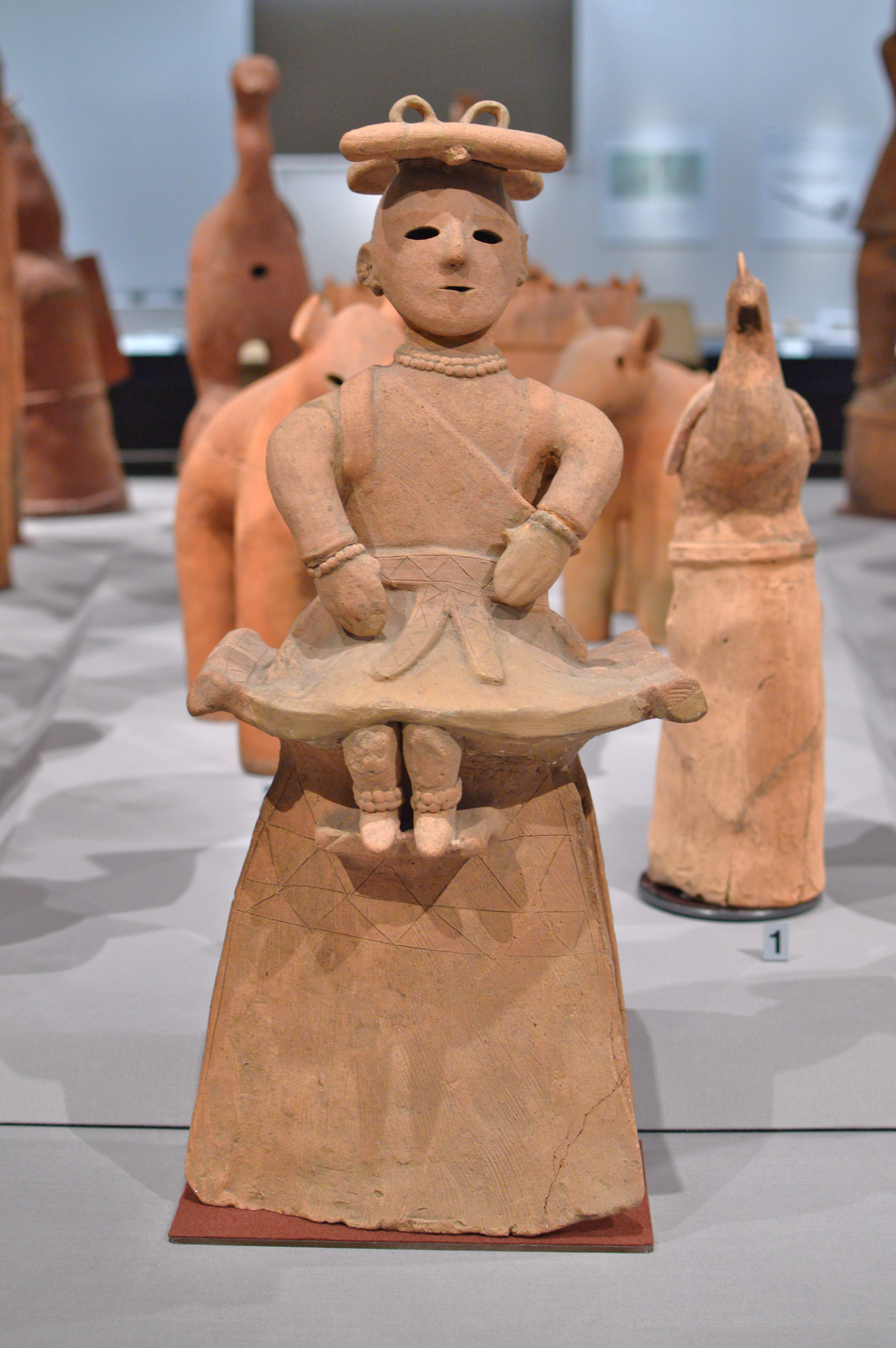
haniwa excavated from Kokaiharamae kofun cluster

The Kokaiharamae No.1 Kofun (古海原前１号古墳) is a Kofun period burial mound, located in the Kokai-cho neighborhood of the town of Ōizumi, Gunma in the Kantō region of Japan. The tumulus was designated a Gunma Prefecture Historic Site in 1988. The artifacts recovered from the site are also collectively designated as a Gunma Prefecture Tangible Cultural Property.Urban encroachment has destroyed most the remaining tumuli in what was once the Kokaiharamae Kofun cluster.

== Overview ==
The Kokaiharamae No.1 Kofun is located on a diluvial plateau on the left bank of the Tone River. Although its appearance has changed significantly over the long years, it is believed to have originally been a hotategata kofun (帆立型古墳) scallop-shaped tumulus, so called because it resembles a zenpōkōenfun keyhole shaped tumulus, but with the anterior rectangular portion very short and wide. It has a total length of approximately 54 meters, with the posterior circular portion 35 meters in diameter, with a height of 3.3 meters. Both cylindrical and figurative haniwa as (human, horse, sword-shaped) well as Sue ware and Haji ware pottery shards were found on the mound. Volcanic ash from Mount Haruna's Futatsudake, which erupted around 500 AD, was found directly above the tumulus mound, thus providing a definite upper limit to the construction date.

Archaeological excavations conducted in 1984 found that it contained two burial chambers that were stacked vertically in a unique configuration, making it an extremely rare tumulus nationwide. Grave goods included Sue ware pottery which dated to the late 5th to early 6th century. Other artifacts included a bronze mirror with pictorial design of mythical beasts, silver-mounted twisted-pattern ring-pommel iron sword, horse trappings (bridle, ferrule fittings, clasp fittings), iron miniatures (iron axe, knife, chisel), wooden-mounted sword, glass magatama, round beads, iron arrowheads, iron sickle, and vertical comb.

The tumulus is located adjacent to the Kokaihigashi Community Center, and is maintained as historical park. It is located approximately five kilometers south of the Tōbu Railway Koizumimachi Station.

== See also ==
- List of Historic Sites of Japan (Gunma)
