= Chūgen Railway =

Chūgen Railway (中原鉄道, Chūgen Tetsudō) was a railway company located in Koizumi-machi (currently Oizumi), Oura district, Gunma prefecture in Japan. The company was founded on April 5, 1913, and purchased by Tobu Railway in 1937.

== History ==
Chūgen Railway began to operate the railway line between Koizumimachi (currently Oizumi) and Tatebayashi on March 12, 1917. It changed its name to Jōshū Railway (上州鉄道, Jōshū Tetsudō) in 1922, and it was purchased by Tobu Railway in 1937. Since then Tobu Railway has operated the line as the Koizumi Line.

== Stations ==
Chūgen Railway (Jōshū Railway) had seven stations: Koizumimachi Station (小泉町駅), Kobugannon Station (瘤観音駅), Shinozuka Station (篠塚駅), Hon-Nakano Station (本中野駅), Mujinazuka Station (貉塚駅), Narushima Station (成島駅) and Tatebayashi Station (館林駅).

Koizumimachi, Shinozuka, Hon-Nakano and Tatebayashi stations were in service from the beginning of the railway. Subsequently, Narushima Station (on April 10, 1926), Kobugannon Station (on June 28, 1931) and Mujinazuka Station (on March 1, 1933) were added.

== Connecting services ==
- Tatebayashi Station: Isesaki Line (東武伊勢崎線)
