= Narushima Station (Gunma) =

Railway station in Tatebayashi, Gunma Prefecture, Japan

TI41 Narushima Station 成島駅
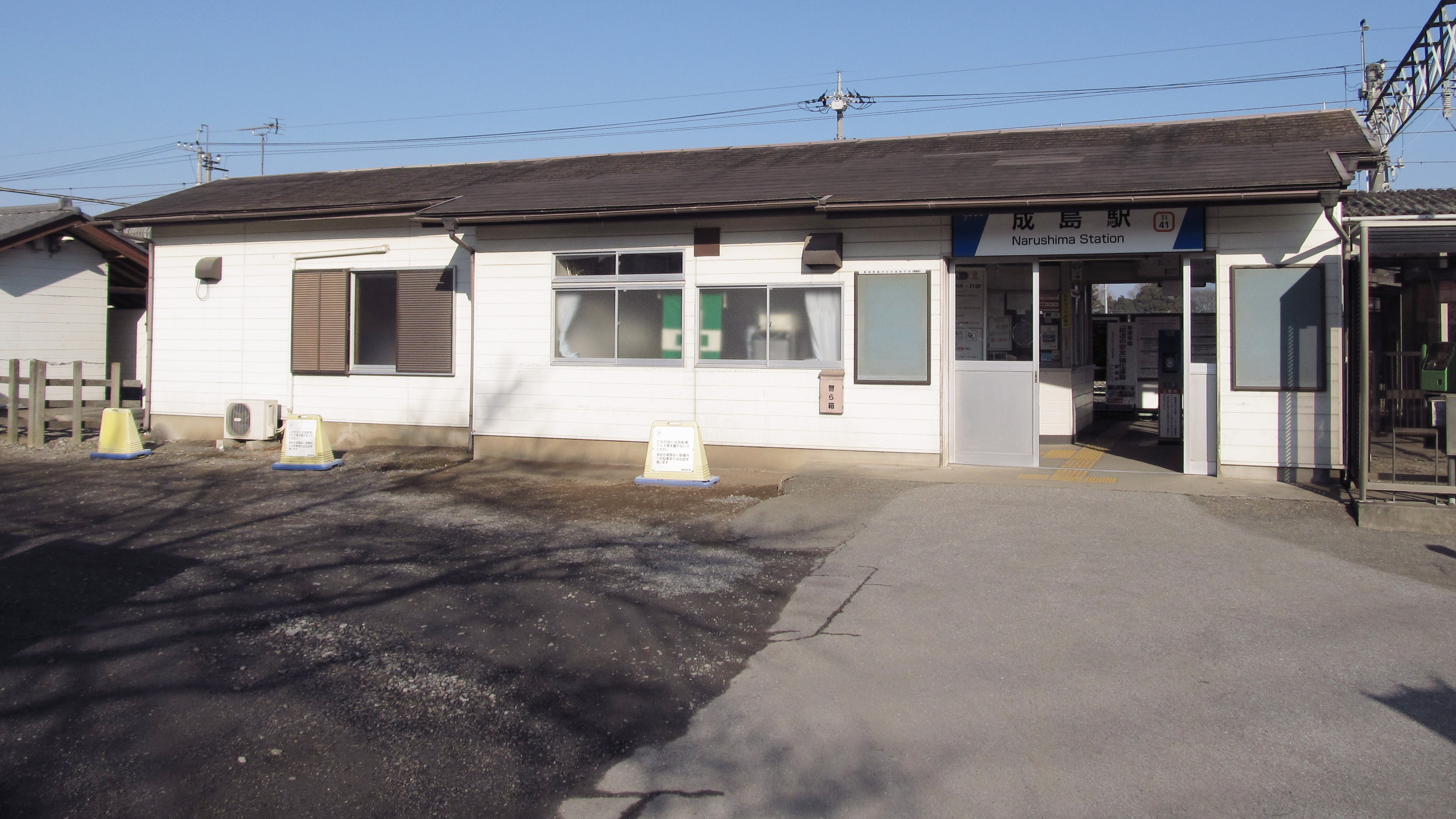
- Narushima Station in December 2014

General information
- Location: Narushimacho, Tatebayashi-shi, Gunma-ken 374-0055; Japan
- Coordinates: 36.2491°N 139.5058°E
- Operator: Tōbu Railway
- Line: Tōbu Koizumi Line
- Distance: 2.6 km from Tatebayashi
- Platforms: 1 island platforms

Other information
- Station code: TI-41
- Website: Official website

History
- Opened: April 10, 1926

Passengers
- FY2019: 982 daily

Services
Preceding station	Tobu Railway	Following station
Tatebayashi TI10 Terminus	Koizumi Line	Hon-Nakano TI42 towards Nishi-Koizumi
Location
- Location within Gunma Prefecture Location within Japan

Narushima Station (成島駅, Narushima-eki) is a passenger railway station in the city of Tatebayashi, Gunma, Japan, operated by the private railway operator Tōbu Railway.

== Lines ==
Narushima Station is served by the Tobu Koizumi Line, and is located 2.6 kilometers from the terminus of the line at Tatebayashi.

== Station layout ==
The station consists of one island platform, connected to the station building by an underground passageway.

=== Platforms ===
1	■ Tōbu Koizumi Line	for Nishi-Koizumi
2	■ Tōbu Koizumi Line	for Tatebayashi

== History ==
The first station was opened as a station of the Koizumi Line operated by Jōshū Railway company on April 10, 1926. The Koizumi Line was purchased by Tōbu Railway in 1937. The station was moved to its current location on February 10, 1944.

From 17 March 2012, station numbering was introduced on all Tōbu lines, with Narushima Station becoming "TI-41".

== Passenger statistics ==
In fiscal 2019, the station was used by an average of 982 passengers daily (boarding passengers only).

== Surrounding area ==
- Tatebayashi High School
- Kanto Junior College
- Tatebayshi Narushima Post Office
