= Mitsuo Aida =

Japanese poet and calligrapher

- 相田みつを
- Born: May 20, 1924; Ashikaga, Tochigi, Japan
- Died: December 17, 1991 (aged 67); Ashikaga, Tochigi, Japan
- Other name: The Poet of Zen
- Education: Kanto Junior College
- Known for: Poet and calligrapher
- Notable work: Ningen damono (Because I'm Human)

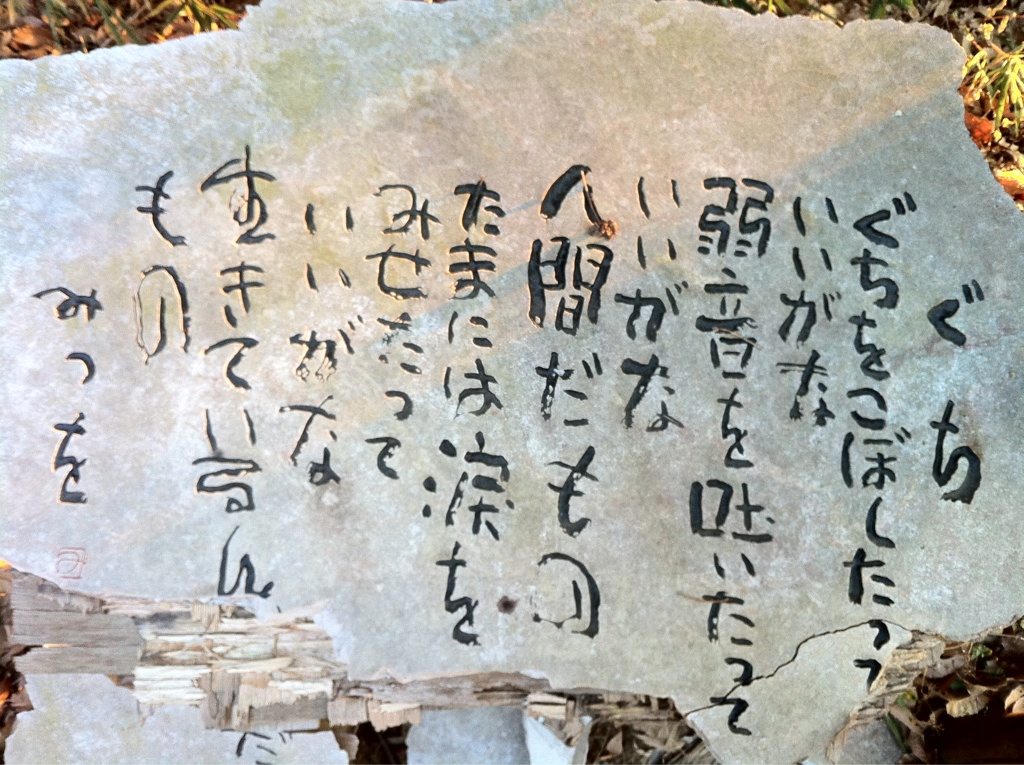
A poem by Mitsuo Aida

Mitsuo Aida (相田みつを, Aida Mitsuo; 20 May 1924 – 17 December 1991) was a Japanese poet and calligrapher known as The Poet of Zen. His work was influenced by Zen Buddhism and he is known for his works, Ningen damono (Because I'm Human), Okagesan (Our Debt to Others), and Inochi ippai (Live a Full Live).

== Early life ==
Aida was born in Ashikaga, Tochigi, Japan, in 1924. At an early age he showed interest in calligraphy and tanka poetry and was characterized for an original style. He attended Tochigi Prefectural Ashikaga High School. After graduation he proceeded to study poetry with Yamashita Mutsuk and calligraphy with Iwasawa Kei-seki. His work is also known to have been influenced by Michiaki Zheng, Takei Akira, and Kinono Kazuyoshi. In 1953, Aida graduated from Kanto Junior College, a private college in Tatebayashi, Gunma.

In 1954, Aida married Hiraga Chie. Their eldest son, Kazuto Aida, is the director of the Mitsuo Aida Museum in Tokyo.

== Career and legacy ==
Aida's works became well known after the publishing of his book, Ningen damono (Because I'm Human), in 1984.

Following a brain hemorrhage, Aida died in Ashikaga, Tochigi, in 1991. Shortly after his death, in 1996, the Mitsuo Aida Museum opened in Ginza, a neighborhood in Tokyo. In 2003, the museum moved to the Tokyo International Forum, a multi-purpose exhibition center. The art show includes approximately 450 of Aida's calligraphy works, and the museum foundation organizes several art appreciation seminars throughout the country each year.

Former Japanese Prime Minister Yoshihiko Noda is known to be a patron of Aida's. In a 2011 pre-election speech, the politician quoted Aida's poetry, saying, "The loach, it doesn't have to imitate the goldfish." This remark let to some confusion about Noda's meaning among his followers, but also a sharp increase in the number of visitors to the Mituso Aida Museum and a renewed interest in Aida's work.

=== Museum ===
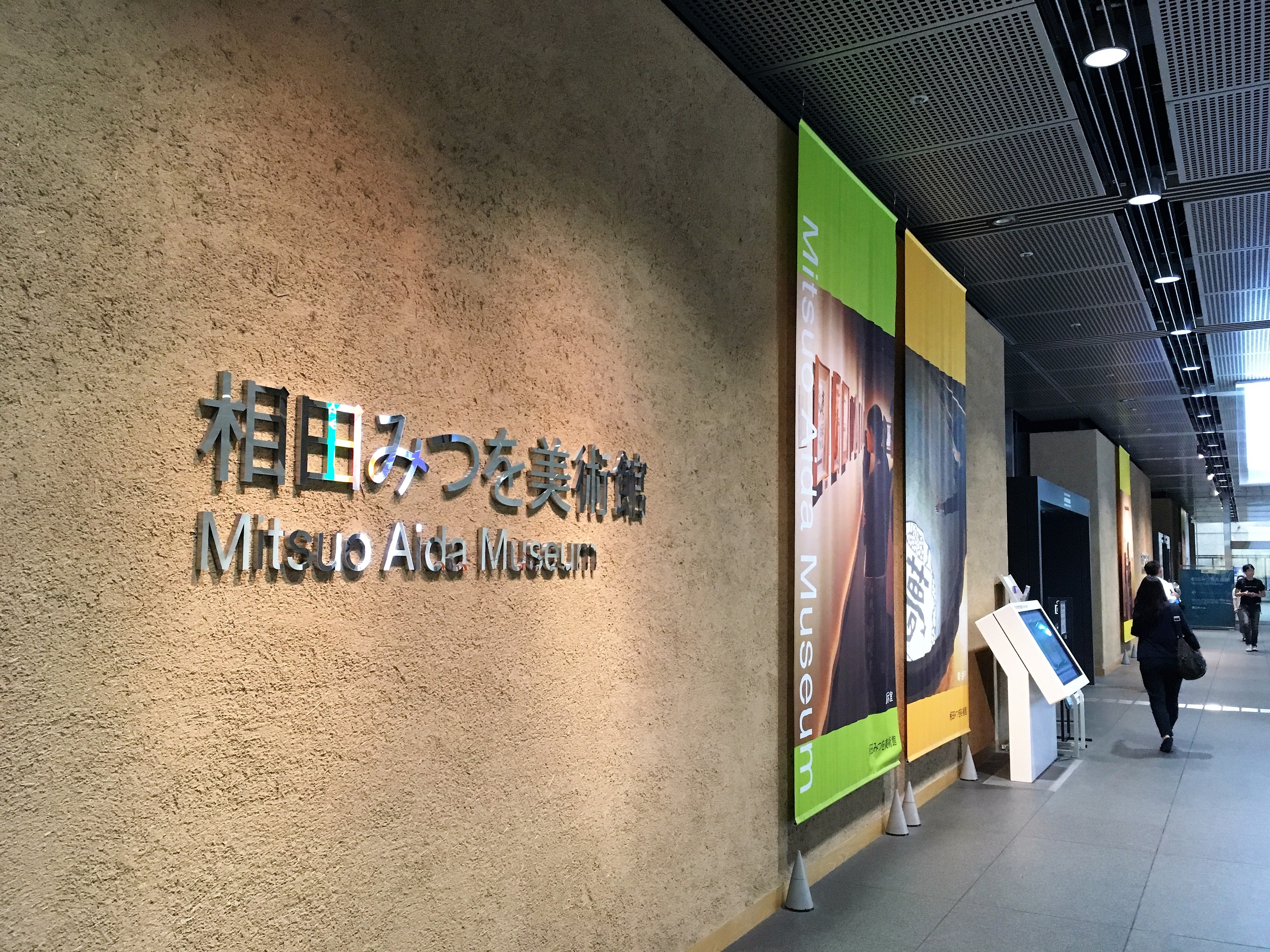
Wall signage at the museum

Mitsuo Aida Museum (相田 みつを) was a private museum in Chiyoda, Tokyo dedicated to the works of Aida. The museum opened in 1996 in Ginza and in 2003 moved to new location near Yurakucho Station, inside the Tokyo International Forum.

The museum was shut down indefinitely on January 28, 2024.
