= Shinozuka =

Shinozuka (written: 篠塚 lit. "bamboo grass mound") is a Japanese surname. Notable people with the surname include:

- Hiromu Shinozuka (篠塚 ひろむ, born 1979), Japanese manga artist
- Ippei Shinozuka (篠塚 一平, born 1995), Japanese-Russian footballer
- Kazunori Shinozuka (篠塚 和典, born 1957), Japanese baseball player and coach
- Kenjiro Shinozuka (篠塚 建次郎, 1948-2024), Japanese rally driver
- Masanobu Shinozuka (篠塚正信, 1930–2018), Japanese engineer
- Yoshio Shinozuka (篠塚 良雄, 1923–2014), member of Unit 731

== See also ==
- Shinozuka Station, a railway station in Ōra, Gunma, Japan
