= Ryūmai Station =

Railway station in Ōta, Gunma Prefecture, Japan

TI47 Ryūmai Station 竜舞駅
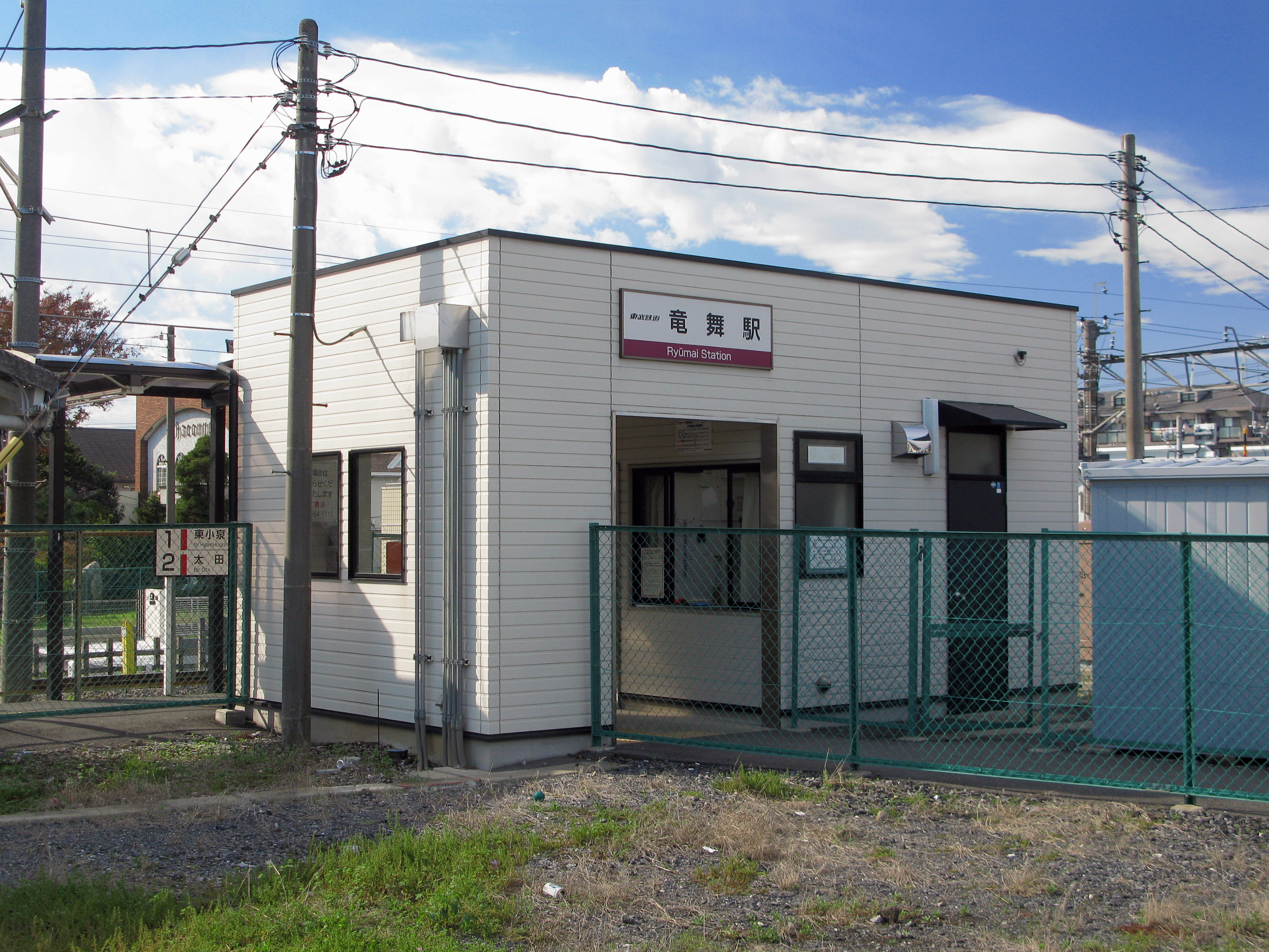
- Ryūmai Station November 2012

General information
- Location: 1838 Ryūmaichoi, Ōta-shi, Gunma-ken 373-0806; Japan
- Coordinates: 36.2790°N 139.4090°E
- Operator: Tōbu Railway
- Line: Tōbu Koizumi Line
- Distance: 5.7 km from Ōta
- Platforms: 1 island platform

Other information
- Station code: TI-47
- Website: Official website

History
- Opened: May 10, 1942

Passengers
- FY2019: 611 daily

Services
Preceding station	Tobu Railway	Following station
Higashi-Koizumi TI10 Terminus	Koizumi Line (branch line)	Ōta TI12 Terminus
Location
- Location within Gunma Prefecture Location within Japan

Ryūmai Station (竜舞駅, Ryūmai-eki) is a passenger railway station in the city of Ōta, Gunma, Japan, operated by the private railway operator Tōbu Railway. It is numbered "TI-47".

== Lines ==
Ryūmai Station is served by the Ōta Branch of the Tōbu Koizumi Line, and is located 5.7 kilometers from the terminus of the line at Ōta.

== Station layout ==
The station consists of a single island platform connected to the station building by a footbridge.

=== Platforms ===
1	■ Tōbu Koizumi Line	for Higashi-Koizumi
2	■ Tōbu Koizumi Line	for Ōta

== History ==
Ryūmai Station opened on May 10, 1942. A new station building was completed in 2008.

From March 17, 2012, station numbering was introduced on all Tōbu lines, with Ryūmai Station becoming "TI-47".

== Passenger statistics ==
In fiscal 2019, the station was used by an average of 611 passengers daily (boarding passengers only).

== Surrounding area ==
- Ōta sports complex
- Ōta-Ryūmai Post Office
