= Shinozuka Station =

Railway station in Ōra, Gunma Prefecture, Japan

TI43 Shinozuka Station 篠塚駅
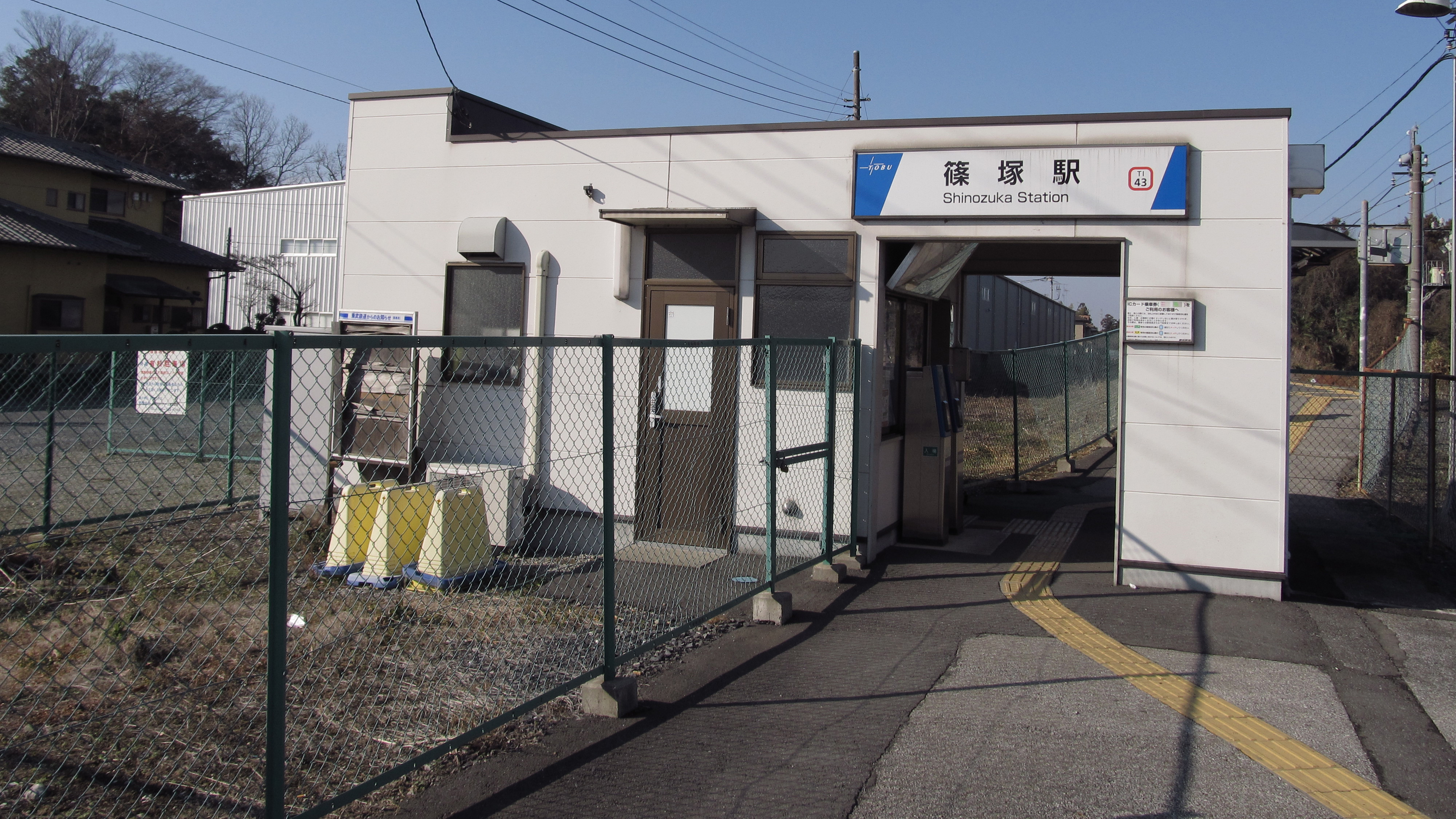
- Shinozuka Station in December 2014

General information
- Location: 3995-3 Shinozuka, Ōra-machi, Ōra-gun, Gunma-ken 370-0615; Japan
- Coordinates: 36°15′25″N 139°26′45″E
- Operator: Tōbu Railway
- Line: Tōbu Koizumi Line
- Distance: 9.2 km from Tatebayashi
- Platforms: 1 side platform

Other information
- Station code: TI-43
- Website: Official website

History
- Opened: March 12, 1917

Passengers
- FY2019: 213 daily

Services
Preceding station	Tobu Railway	Following station
Hon-Nakano TI42 towards Tatebayashi	Koizumi Line	Higashi-Koizumi TI44 towards Nishi-Koizumi
Location
- Location within Gunma Prefecture Location within Japan

Shinozuka Station (篠塚駅, Shinozuka-eki) is a passenger railway station in the town of Ōra, Gunma, Japan, operated by the private railway operator Tōbu Railway. It is numbered "TI-43".

== Lines ==
Shinozuka Station is served by the Tōbu Koizumi Line, and is located 9.2 kilometers from the terminus of the line at Tatebayashi.

== Station layout ==
The station consists of a single side platform serving traffic in both directions.

== History ==
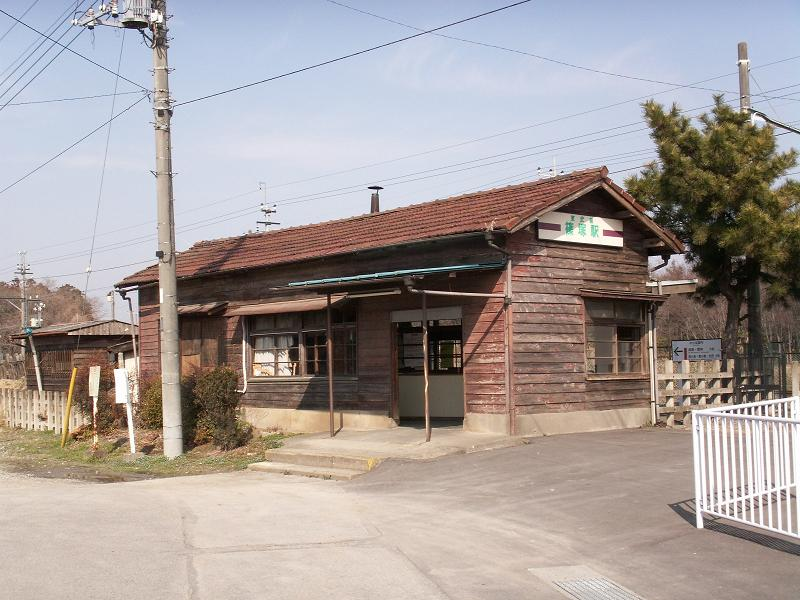
The old station structure that was used until 2006

Shinozuka Station was opened as a station of the Koizumi Line operated by Jōshū Railway company on March 12, 1917. The Koizumi Line was purchased by Tōbu Railway in 1937. A new station building was built in 2006.

From March 17, 2012, station numbering was introduced on all Tōbu lines, with Shinozuka Station becoming "TI-43".

== Passenger statistics ==
In fiscal 2019, the station was used by an average of 213 passengers daily (boarding passengers only).

== Surrounding area ==
- National Route 354
- Nagara Jinja
- Daishin-ji Temple

== See also ==
- List of railway stations in Japan
