= Hon-Nakano Station =

Railway station in Ōra, Gunma Prefecture, Japan

TI42 Hon-Nakano Station 本中野駅
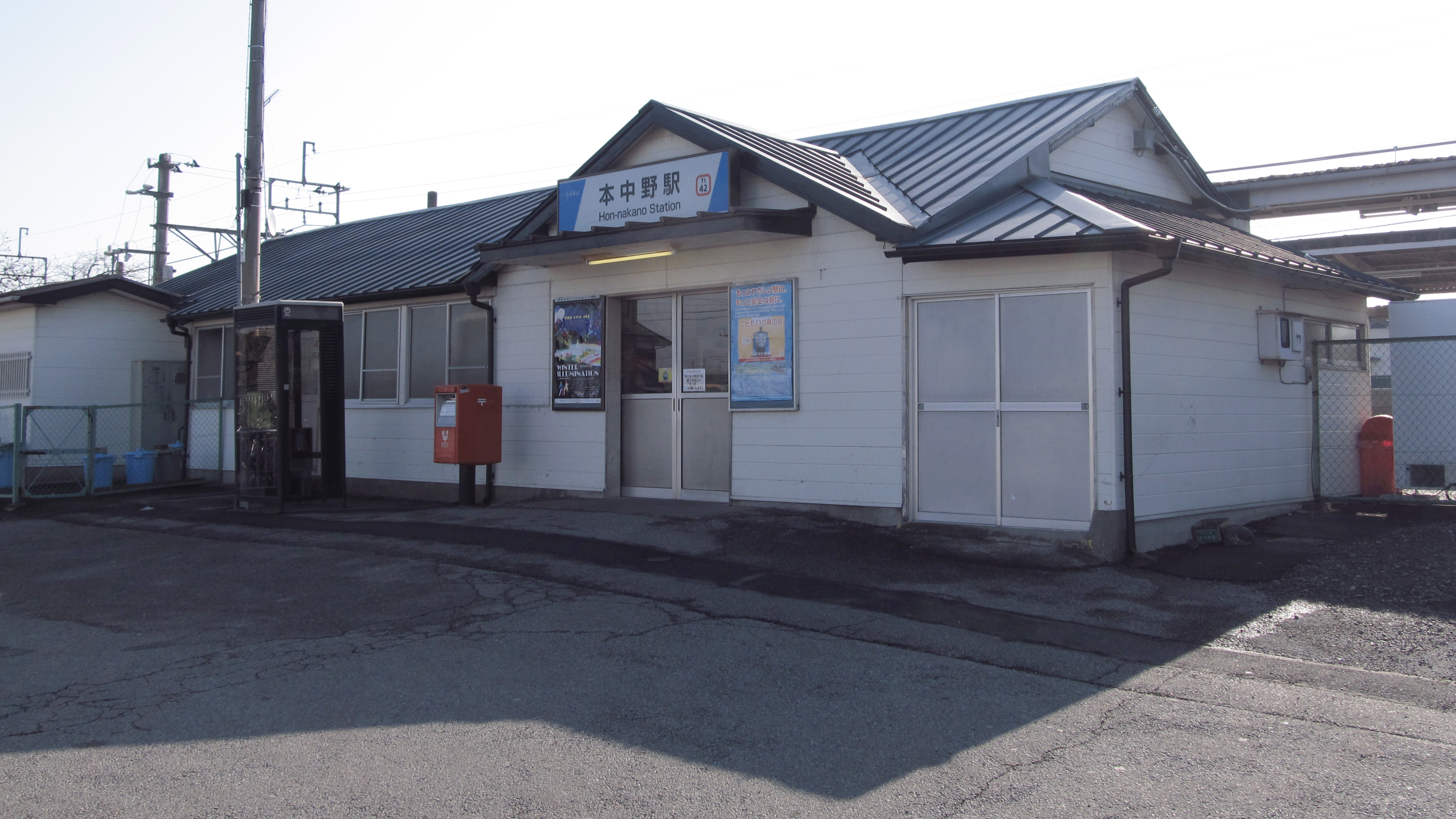
- Hon-Nakano Station in December 2014

General information
- Location: 4858-5 Nakano, Ōra-machi, Ōra-gun, Gunma-ken 370-0603; Japan
- Coordinates: 36.2585°N 139.4697°E
- Operator: Tōbu Railway
- Line: Tōbu Koizumi Line
- Distance: 6.8 km from Tatebayashi
- Platforms: 2 side platforms

Other information
- Station code: TI-42
- Website: Official website

History
- Opened: March 12, 1917

Passengers
- FY2019: 963 daily

Services
Preceding station	Tobu Railway	Following station
Narushima TI41 towards Tatebayashi	Koizumi Line	Shinozuka TI43 towards Nishi-Koizumi
Location
- Location within Gunma Prefecture Location within Japan

Hon-Nakano Station (本中野駅, Hon-Nakano-eki) is a passenger railway station in the town of Ōra, Gunma, Japan, operated by the private railway operator Tōbu Railway. It is numbered "TI-42".

== Lines ==
Hon-Nakano Station is served by the Tōbu Koizumi Line, and is located 6.8 kilometers from the terminus of the line at Tatebayashi.

== Station layout ==
The station consists of two opposed side platforms, connected to the station building by a footbridge.

=== Platforms ===
1	■ Tōbu Koizumi Line	for Nishi-Koizumi
2	■ Tōbu Koizumi Line	for Tatebayashi

== History ==
Hon-Nakano Station was opened as a station of the Koizumi Line operated by Jōshū Railway company on March 12, 1917. The Koizumi Line was purchased by Tōbu Railway in 1937. The station was moved to its current location on June 1, 1922.

From March 17, 2012, station numbering was introduced on all Tōbu lines, with Hon-Nakano Station becoming "TI-42".

== Passenger statistics ==
In fiscal 2019, the station was used by an average of 963 passengers daily (boarding passengers only).

== Surrounding area ==
- Tatebayashi High School
- Ōra Town Hall
- Ōra Post Office
- Shinko-ji Temple

== See also ==
- List of railway stations in Japan
