= Higashi-Koizumi Station =

Railway station in Ōizumi, Gunma Prefecture, Japan

TI44 Higashi-Koizumi Station 東小泉駅
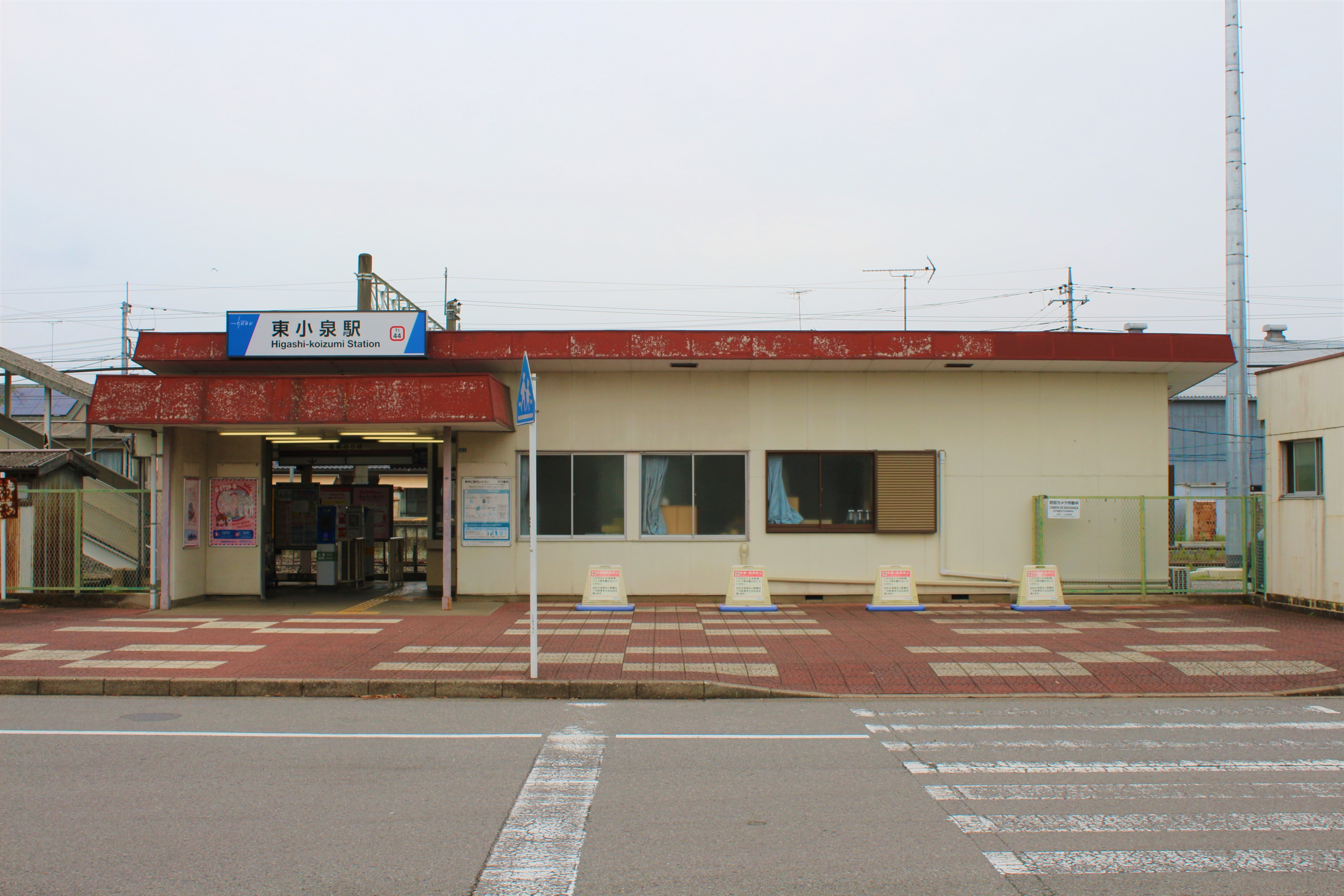
- Higshi-Koizumi Station in June 2020

General information
- Location: 1-18-1 Higashi-Koizumi, Ōizumi-machi, Ōra-gun, Gunma-ken 370-0513; Japan
- Coordinates: 36°15′34″N 139°25′45″E
- Operator: Tōbu Railway
- Line: Tōbu Koizumi Line
- Distance: 11.0 km from Tatebayashi
- Platforms: 1 island platform

Other information
- Station code: TI-44
- Website: Official website

History
- Opened: December 1, 1941

Passengers
- FY2019: 1517 daily

Services
Preceding station	Tobu Railway	Following station
Shinozuka TI43 towards Tatebayashi	Koizumi Line	Koizumimachi TI45 towards Nishi-Koizumi
Terminus	Koizumi Line (branch line)	Ryūmai TI47 towards Ōta
Location
- Location within Gunma Prefecture Location within Japan

Higashi-Koizumi Station (東小泉駅, Higashi-Koizumi-eki) is a passenger railway station in the town of Ōizumi, Gunma, Japan, operated by the private railway operator Tōbu Railway. It is numbered "TI-44".

== Lines ==
Higashi-Koizumi Station is served by the Tōbu Koizumi Line, and is located 11.0 kilometers from the terminus of the line at Tatebayashi. It is also the terminal station of a branch line of the Tōbu Koizumi Line, which terminates at Ōta 9.1 kilometers away.

== Station layout ==
The station consists of a single island platform connected to the station building by a footbridge.

=== Platforms ===
1	■ Tōbu Koizumi Line	for Nishi-Koizumi for Tatebayashi
2	■ Tōbu Koizumi Line	for Ōta

== History ==
Higashi-Koizumi Station opened on December 1, 1941, and elevated to a full passenger station in April 1942. It reverted to a signal stop in 1955, and was not restored as a passenger station until 1977 From 17 March 2012, station numbering was introduced on all Tōbu lines, with Higashi-Koizumi Station becoming "TI-44".

== Passenger statistics ==
In fiscal 2019, the station was used by an average of 1517 passengers daily (boarding passengers only).

== Surrounding area ==
- National Route 354

== See also ==
- List of railway stations in Japan
