= Ōra, Gunma =

Ōra 邑楽町
- Town
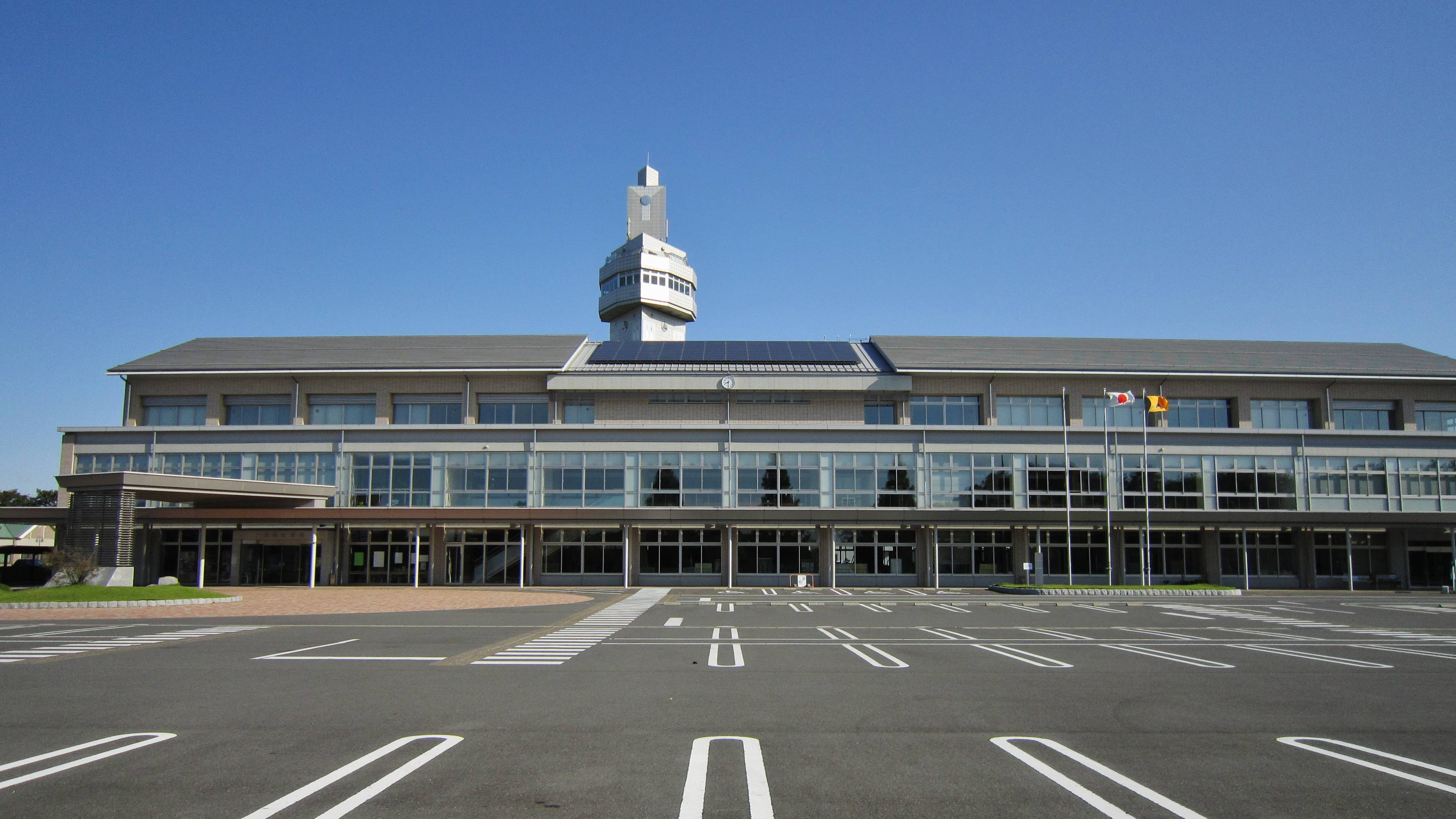
- Ōra town hall

- Flag Seal

- Location of Ōra in Gunma Prefecture

- Coordinates: 36°15′8.6″N 139°27′44.3″E
- Country: Japan
- Region: Kantō
- Prefecture: Gunma
- District: Ōra

Area
  - Total: 31.11 km^{2} (12.01 sq mi)

Population (August 2020)
  - Total: 26,267
  - Density: 844.3/km^{2} (2,187/sq mi)
- Time zone: UTC+9 (Japan Standard Time)
- Tree: Pinus densiflora
- Flower: Azalea
- Phone number: 0276-88-5511
- Address: 3040 Nakano, Ōra-machi, Gunma-ken 370-0692
- Website: Official website

Ōra (邑楽町, Ōra-machi) is a town located in Gunma Prefecture, Japan. As of 31 August 2020, the town had an estimated population of 26,267 in 10,382 households, and a population density of 840 persons per km^{2}. The total area of the town is 31.11 square kilometres (12.01 sq mi).

== Geography ==
Ōra is located in the extreme southern corner Gunma prefecture, bordered by Tochigi Prefecture to the north.

=== Surrounding municipalities ===
Gunma Prefecture

- Chiyoda
- Meiwa
- Ōizumi
- Ōta
- Tatebayashi

Tochigi Prefecture

- Ashikaga

== Demographics ==
Per Japanese census data, the population of Ōra peaked around the year 2000 and has declined since.

Historical population
Year	Pop.	±%
1960	15,159	—
1970	15,030	−0.9%
1980	21,869	+45.5%
1990	26,380	+20.6%
2000	27,512	+4.3%
2010	27,023	−1.8%
2020	25,522	−5.6%

== History ==
The villages of Nakano, Takashima and Nagae were created within Ōra District, Gunma Prefecture on April 1, 1889, with the creation of the modern municipalities system after the Meiji Restoration. On March 1, 1955, Nakano and Takashima merged to form the village of Nakajima. Nakae merged with neighboring Tominaga and Eiraku to form the village of Chiyoda. However, on September 30, 1956, the former Nakae village was transferred from Chiyoda to Nakajima, and Nakajma was renamed Ōra on January 1, 1957. Ōra was elevated to town status on April 1, 1968.

== Government ==
Ōra has a mayor-council form of government with a directly elected mayor and a unicameral town council of 14 members. Ōra, together with the other municipalities in Ōra District contributes three members to the Gunma Prefectural Assembly. In terms of national politics, the town is part of Gunma 3rd district of the lower house of the Diet of Japan.

== Education ==
Ōra has four public elementary schools and two public middle schools operated by the town government, and one public high school operated by the Gunma prefecture Board of Education.

== Transportation ==
=== Railway ===
Tōbu Railway –Tōbu Koizumi Line

- Hon-Nakano - Shinozuka

=== Highway ===
- National Route 122
- National Route 354

== Local attractions ==
- Matsumoto Park
- Ōra Symbol Tower
- Tatara Marshland
