= Tōbu Koizumi Line =

Railway line of Tobu Railway

Koizumi Line

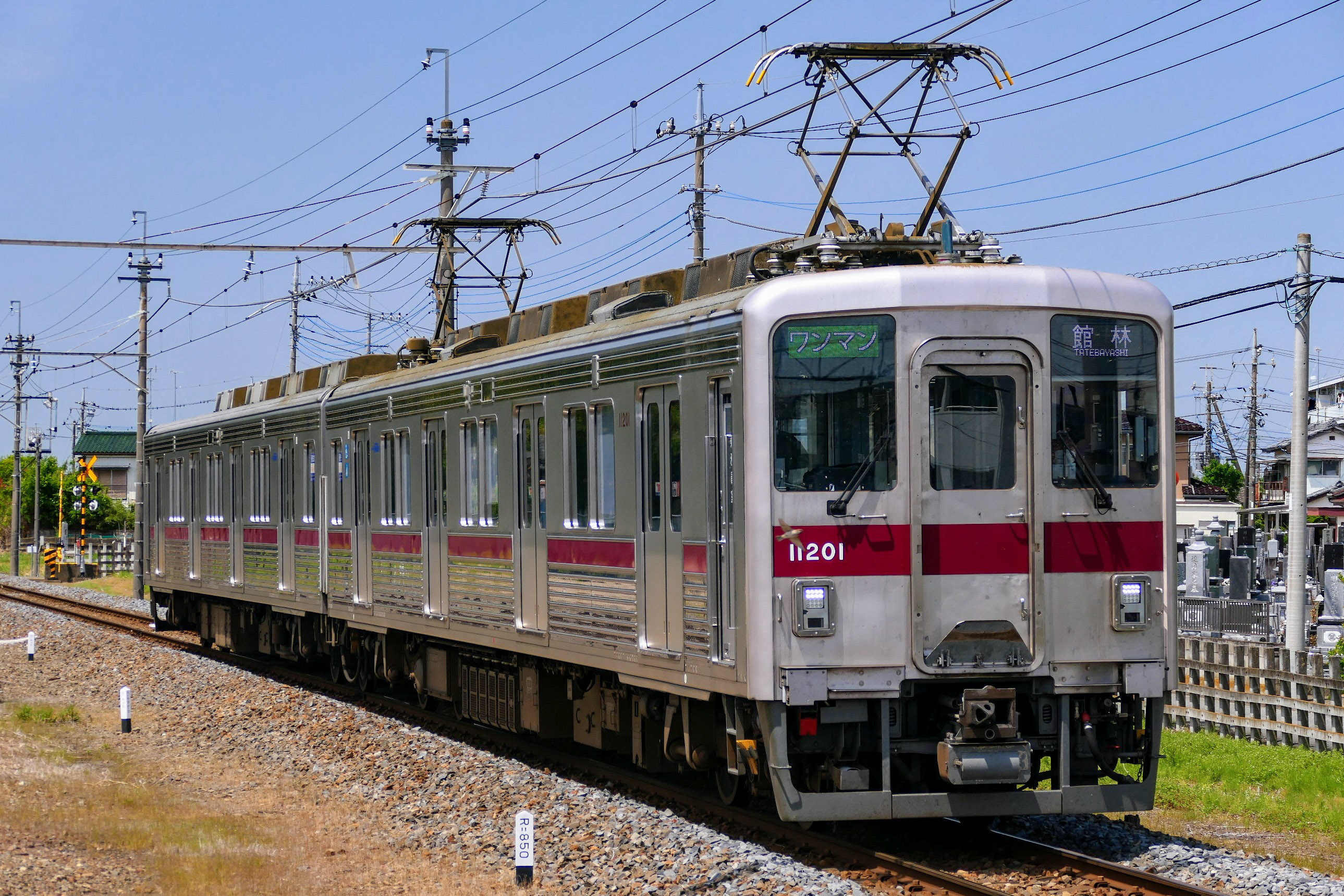
- A Koizumi Line train approaching Narushima Station in May 2025

Overview
- Native name: 小泉線
- Status: In service
- Owner: Tobu Railway Co., Ltd.
- Locale: Gunma Prefecture
- Termini: Tatebayashi; Nishi-Koizumi/Higashi-Koizumi
- Stations: 10 total 7 (main branch), 3 (Ota branch)

Service
- Type: Commuter rail
- System: Tobu Railway
- Route number: TI
- Operator(s): Tobu Railway Co., Ltd.

History
- Opened: 12 March 1917; 109 years ago

Technical
- Track gauge: 1,067 mm (3 ft 6 in)
- Electrification: 1,500 V DC, overhead catenary

The Koizumi Line (小泉線, Koizumi-sen), operated by the railway operator Tobu Railway, connects Tatebayashi Station located in Tatebayashi, Gunma to Nishi-Koizumi Station located in Ōizumi, Gunma as well as Higashi-Koizumi Station in Ōizumi town to Ōta Station in Ōta, Gunma Japan and before was blue the train.

== Stations ==
No.	Name		Connections	Location	
TI10	Tatebayashi	館林	Isesaki Line (TI11); Sano Line (TI10)	Tatebayashi	Gunma
TI41	Narushima	成島		Tatebayashi	Gunma
TI42	Hon-Nakano	本中野		Ōra	Gunma
TI43	Shinozuka	篠塚		Ōra	Gunma
TI44	Higashi-Koizumi	東小泉	Koizumi Line (branch line) for Ōta	Ōizumi	Gunma
TI45	Koizumimachi	小泉町		Ōizumi	Gunma
TI46	Nishi-Koizumi	西小泉		Ōizumi	Gunma
The line splits at Higashi-Koizumi.
TI44	Higashi-Koizumi	東小泉	Koizumi Line for Tatebayashi/Nishi-Koizumi	Ōizumi	Gunma
TI47	Ryūmai	竜舞		Ōta	Gunma
TI18	Ōta	太田	Isesaki Line (TI18); Kiryū Line (TI18)	Ōta	Gunma

== Abandoned stations ==
- Shin-Koizumi Station - Sengokugashi Station
- Kobugannon Station (between Higashi-Koizumi Station and Shinozuka Station)
- Mujinazuka Station (between Narushima Station and Hon-Nakano Station)

== History ==
The first section of the line from Tatebayashi Station to Koizumimachi Station was opened for passenger service on March 12, 1917, operated by the Chūgen Railway, which was purchased by Tobu Railway company in 1937.

The 3 km Sengokugashi Freight Line (仙石河岸貨物線) from Koizumimachi Station to Sengokugashi Station (仙石河岸駅) opened on April 13, 1939, as a freight-only branch line. Passenger services as far as Nishi-Koizumi commenced in 1941.

In 1941, Higashi-Koizumi Station to Ōta Station section opened on June 1, 1941, to service the Nakajima Aircraft Company Ōta and Koizumi plants. The lines were electrified in 1943.

The Nishi-Koizumi to Sengoku freight branch closed in 1976, and freight services ceased on the line in 1996.
