= Koizumimachi Station =

Railway station in Ōizumi, Gunma Prefecture, Japan

TI45 Koizumimachi Station 小泉町駅
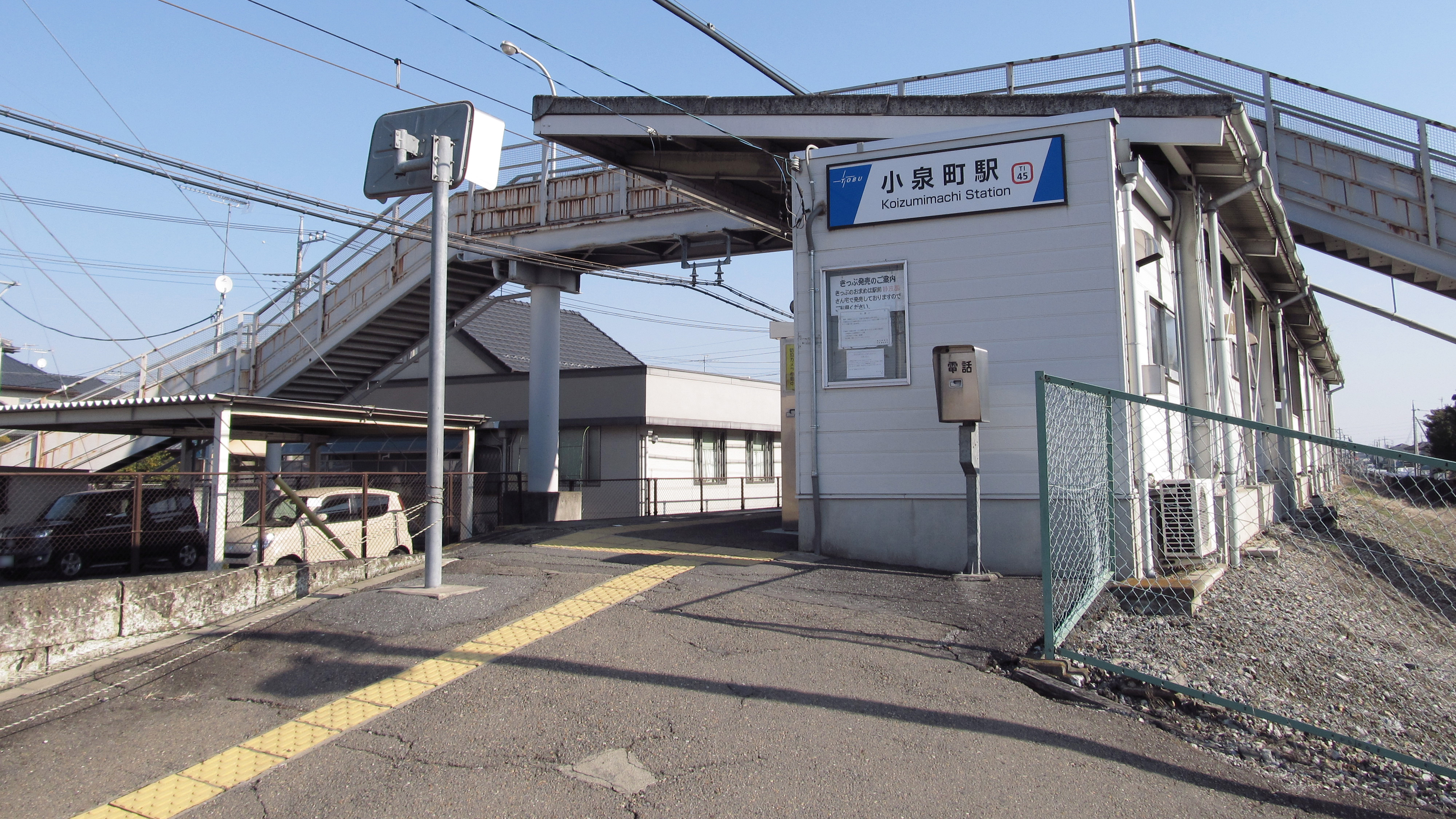
- Koizumimachi Station in December 2014

General information
- Location: 2-4-1 Shiro-no-uchi, Ōizumi-machi, Ōra-gun, Gunma-ken 370-0518; Japan
- Coordinates: 36°15′41″N 139°25′13″E
- Operator: Tōbu Railway
- Line: Tōbu Koizumi Line
- Distance: 11.9 km from Tatebayashi
- Platforms: 1 side platform

Other information
- Station code: TI-45
- Website: Official website

History
- Opened: March 12, 1917

Passengers
- FY2019: 400 daily

Services
Preceding station	Tobu Railway	Following station
Higashi-Koizumi TI44 towards Tatebayashi	Koizumi Line	Nishi-Koizumi TI46 Terminus
Location
- Location within Gunma Prefecture Location within Japan

Koizumimachi Station (小泉町駅, Koizumimachi-eki) is a passenger railway station in the town of Ōizumi, Gunma, Japan, operated by the private railway operator Tōbu Railway. It is numbered "TI-45".

== Lines ==
Koizumimachi Station is served by the Tōbu Koizumi Line, and is located 11.9 kilometers from the terminus of the line at Tatebayashi.

== Station layout ==
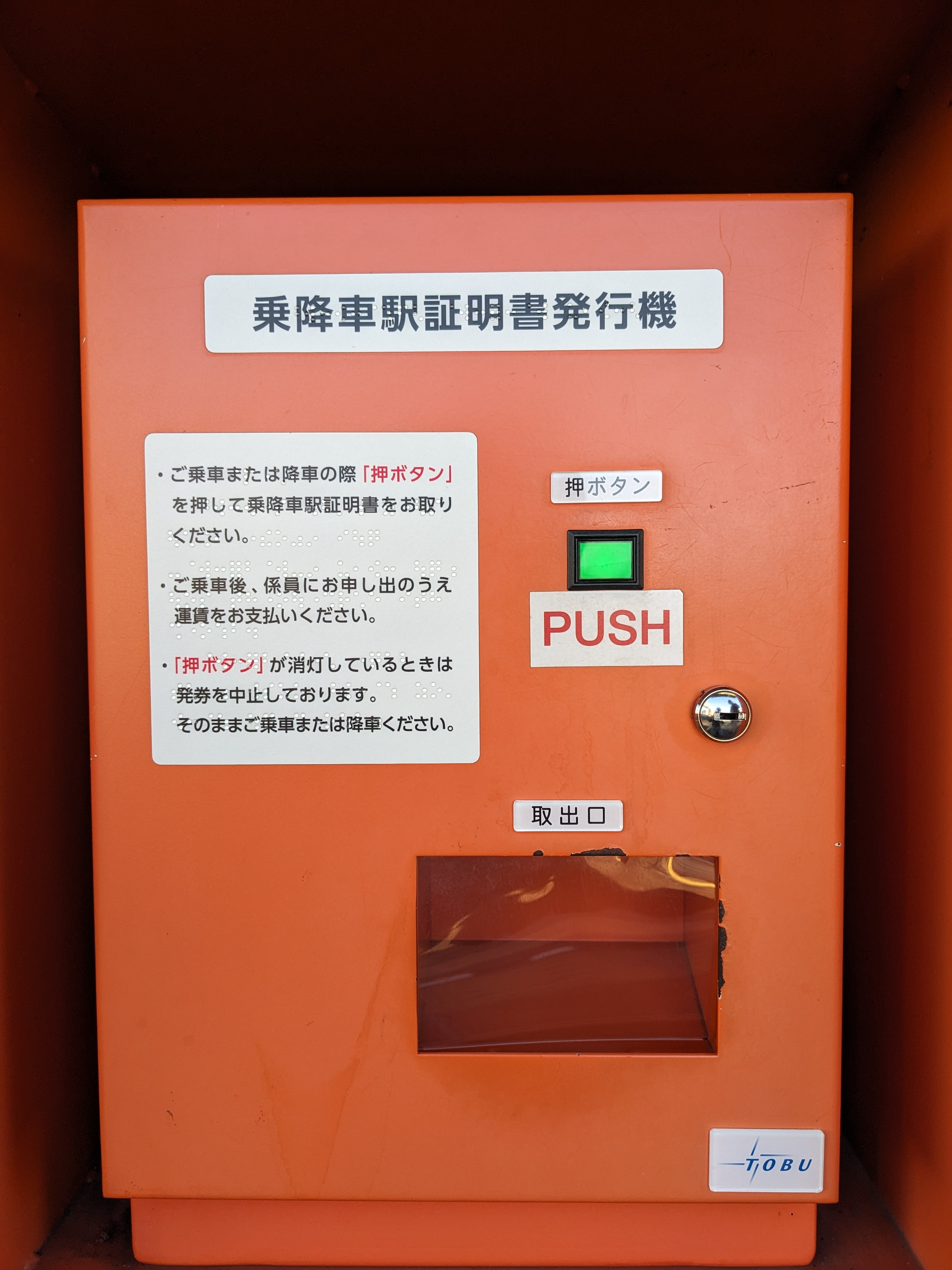
Machine to issue a certificate of the boarding station

The station is composed of a single side platform that accommodates traffic in both directions, complemented by the station building. Benches within the station, located under the roof area, provide passengers with a place to sit and await the arrival of trains. Moreover, a pedestrian bridge situated outside the station ensures smooth access across the railroad.

There are no turnstiles or other barriers in this station. Instead a PASMO-compatible ticket gate which does not have gate function is prepared for PASMO or smart Card train ticket passengers. Conversely, for passengers who do not have a PASMO or smart card train ticket, a machine is available to issue a certificate of the boarding and alighting station.

== History ==
Koizumimachi Station was opened as a station of the Koizumi Line operated by Jōshū Railway company on March 12, 1917. The Koizumi Line was purchased by Tōbu Railway in 1937.

From March 17, 2012, station numbering was introduced on all Tōbu lines, with Koizumimachi Station becoming "TI-45".

== Passenger statistics ==
In fiscal 2019, the station was used by an average of 400 passengers daily (boarding passengers only).

== Surrounding area ==
- site of Koizumi Castle
- Ōizumi Post Office
- Koizumi shrine
- Ōizumi High School

== See also ==
- List of railway stations in Japan
