= Kanto Junior College =

Private junior college in Tatebayashi, Gunma, Japan

Coordinates: 36°14′41.3″N 139°29′58.3″E

- 関東短期大学
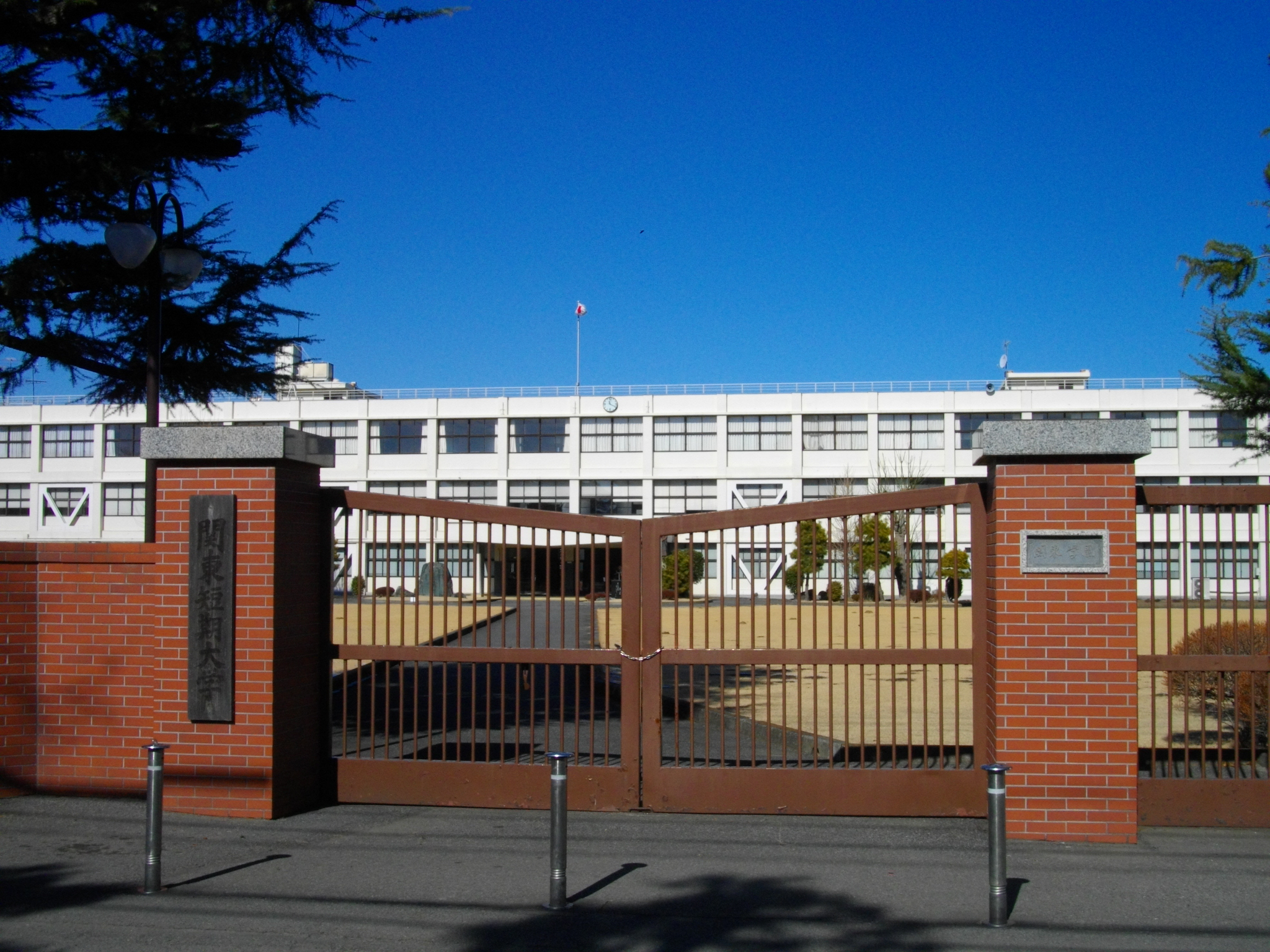
- Type: Private
- Established: Founded 1924; Chartered 1950
- Location: Tatebayashi, Gunma, Japan
- Website: Official website

Kanto Junior College (関東短期大学, Kantō tanki daigaku) is a private junior college in Tatebayashi, Gunma, Japan, established in 1950. The predecessor of the school was founded in 1924. The school is affiliated with the Kanto Gakuen University, in Ōta, Gunma. The school currently specializes only in children's education, providing licensed accreditation for kindergarten and nursery school teachers.
