= Ōizumi, Gunma =

Ōizumi 大泉町
- Town
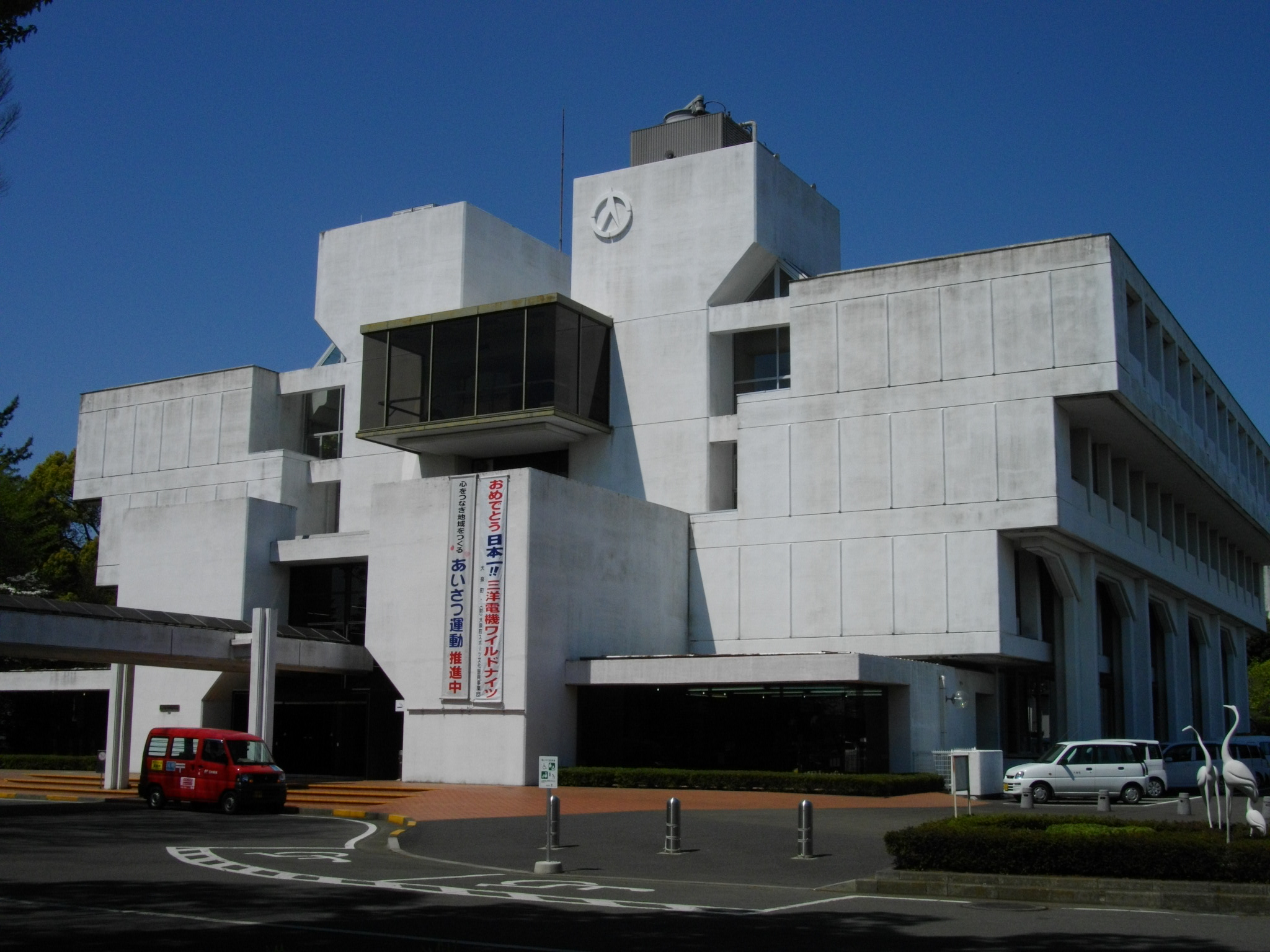
- Ōizumi town hall

- Flag Seal

- Location of Ōizumi in Gunma Prefecture

- Coordinates: 36°14′52.2″N 139°24′17.7″E
- Country: Japan
- Region: Kantō
- Prefecture: Gunma
- District: Ōra

Government
  - Mayor: Toshiaki Murayama

Area
  - Total: 18.03 km^{2} (6.96 sq mi)

Population (August 2020)
  - Total: 41,918
  - Density: 2,325/km^{2} (6,021/sq mi)
- Time zone: UTC+9 (Japan Standard Time)
  - Tree: Zelkova serrata
  - Flower: Tulip, Salvia splendens
- Phone number: 0276-63-3111
- Address: 55-1 Hinode, Ōizumi-machi, Gunma-ken 370-0595
- Website: Official website

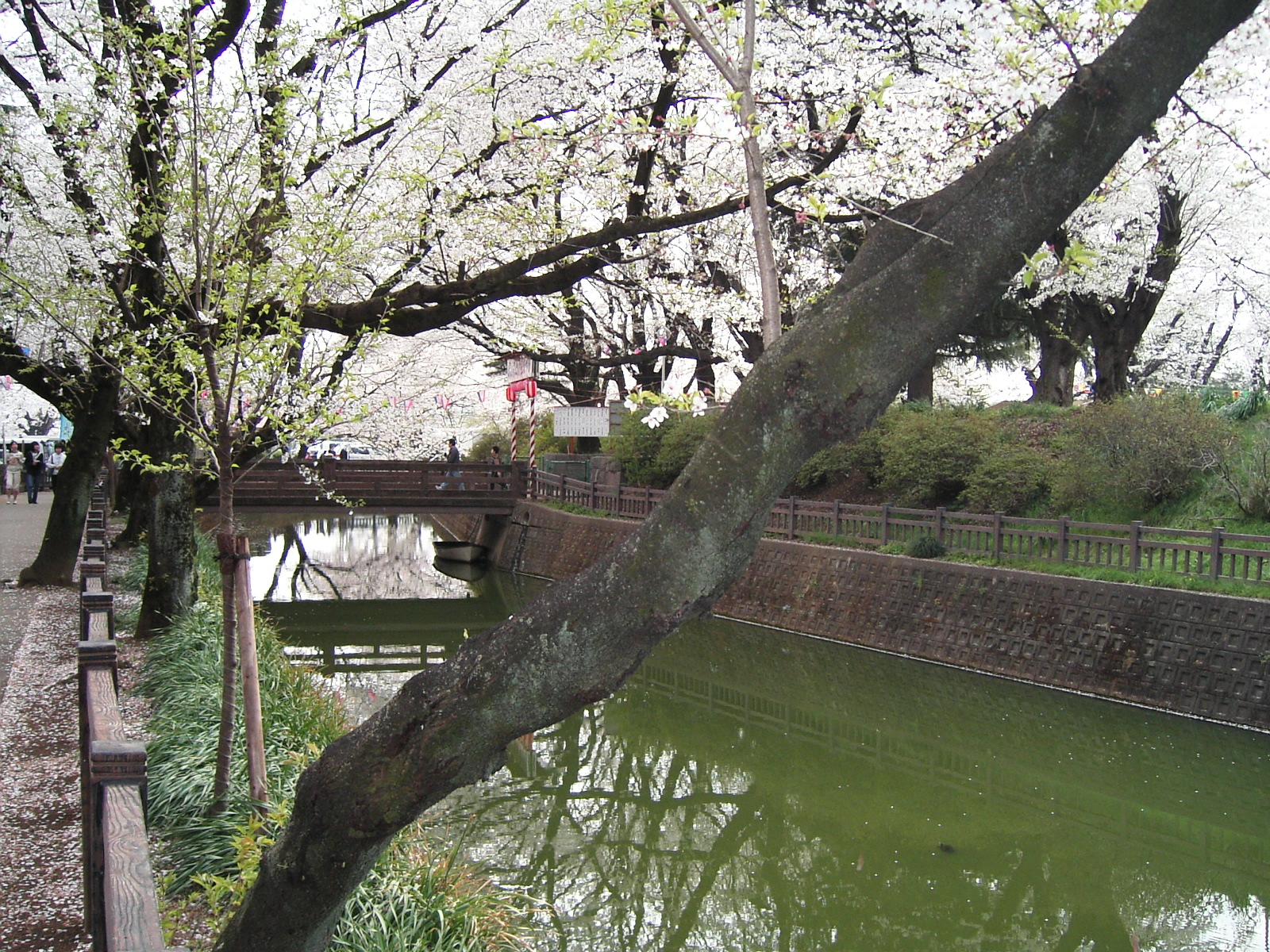
Ruins of Koizumi Castle

Ōizumi (大泉町, Ōizumi-machi) is a town located in Gunma Prefecture, Japan. As of 31 August 2020, the town had an estimated population of 41,918 in 19,773 households, and a population density of 2300 persons per km^{2}. The total area of the town is 18.03 km^{2} (6.96 sq mi). Approximately 20 percent of the total population are foreign citizens, mostly Japanese Brazilians, who work at many factories in the town. Since 1990, Japanese descendants from foreign countries have been permitted to stay in Japan freely. It is estimated that 15 percent of the population speak Portuguese as their native language, and as of 2007, Ōizumi has the highest concentration of Brazilians of any city in Japan. More recently, Nepalese and other Asians have begun settling in the town.

== Geography ==
Ōizumi is located in the extreme southern corner Gunma prefecture, bordered by Saitama Prefecture to the south. The Tone River flows through the southern part of the town.

=== Surrounding municipalities ===
Gunma Prefecture

- Chiyoda
- Ōra
- Ōta

Saitama Prefecture

- Kumagaya

=== Climate ===
Ōizumi has a humid continental climate (Köppen Dfa) characterized by hot summers and cold winters. The average annual temperature in Ōizumi is 14.5 °C. The average annual rainfall is 1263 mm with September as the wettest month. The temperatures are highest on average in August, at around 26.7 °C, and lowest in January, at around 3.3 °C.

== Demographics ==
Per Japanese census data, the population of Ōizumi has grown significantly over the past 100 years.

Historical population
Year	Pop.	±%
1920	8,626	—
1930	8,902	+3.2%
1940	12,059	+35.5%
1950	18,397	+52.6%
1960	19,128	+4.0%
1970	25,149	+31.5%
1980	31,283	+24.4%
1990	39,232	+25.4%
2000	41,403	+5.5%
2010	40,254	−2.8%
2020	42,089	+4.6%

== History ==
The villages of Ōkawa and Koizumi were created within Ōra District, Gunma Prefecture on April 1, 1889, with the creation of the modern municipalities system after the Meiji Restoration. Koizumi was elevated to town status on July 25, 1902. On March 31, 1957, Koizumi merged with the village of Ōkawa and was renamed Ōizumi. Plans to merge with neighboring Chiyoda in 2004 and with Ōta in 2008 were rejected by the local town assembly.

== Government ==
Ōizumi has a mayor-council form of government with a directly elected mayor and a unicameral town council of 14 members. Ōizumi, together with the other municipalities in Ōra District contributes three members to the Gunma Prefectural Assembly. In terms of national politics, the town is part of Gunma 3rd district of the lower house of the Diet of Japan.

== Economy ==
Ōizumi has an industrial base, with manufacturing facilities including plants from Ajinomoto, Sanyo, Toppan, Maruha Nichiro and Fuji Heavy Industries (which was previously the plant of the Nakajima Aircraft Company), located in the town.

== Education ==
Ōizumi has four public elementary schools and three public junior high schools operated by the town government, and two public high schools operated by the Gunma prefecture Board of Education.

Prefectural high schools:

- Nishi Oura High School
- Oizumi High School

Municipal junior high schools:

- Kita (North) Junior High School (大泉町立北中学校)
- Minami (South) Junior High School (大泉町立南中学校)
- Nishi (West) Junior High School (大泉町立西中学校)

Municipal elementary schools:

- Higashi (East) Elementary School (大泉町立東小学校)
- Kita (North) Elementary School (大泉町立北小学校)
- Minami (South) Elementary School (大泉町立南小学校)
- Nishi (West) Elementary School (大泉町立西小学校)

International schools:

- Instituto Educacional Centro Nippo-Brasileiro – Brazilian school
- Instituto Educacional Gente Miúda – Brazilian school

The city formerly housed the Escola da Professora Rebeca, another Brazilian international school.

== Transportation ==
=== Railway ===
Tōbu Railway – Tōbu Koizumi Line

- Nishi-Koizumi – Koizumimachi – Higashi-Koizumi

=== Highway ===
- National Route 142

== Sister cities ==
- Guaratinguetá, São Paulo, Brazil

== Local attractions ==
- Ainohara remains (間之原遺跡) of Jōmon period (3500 BC-3000 BC)
- Koizumi Castle ruins (小泉城跡)
- Koizumi shrine (小泉神社)
- Ryusenji temple (竜泉寺)
