= Japan National Route 354 =

Road in Japan

National Route 354
- 国道354号
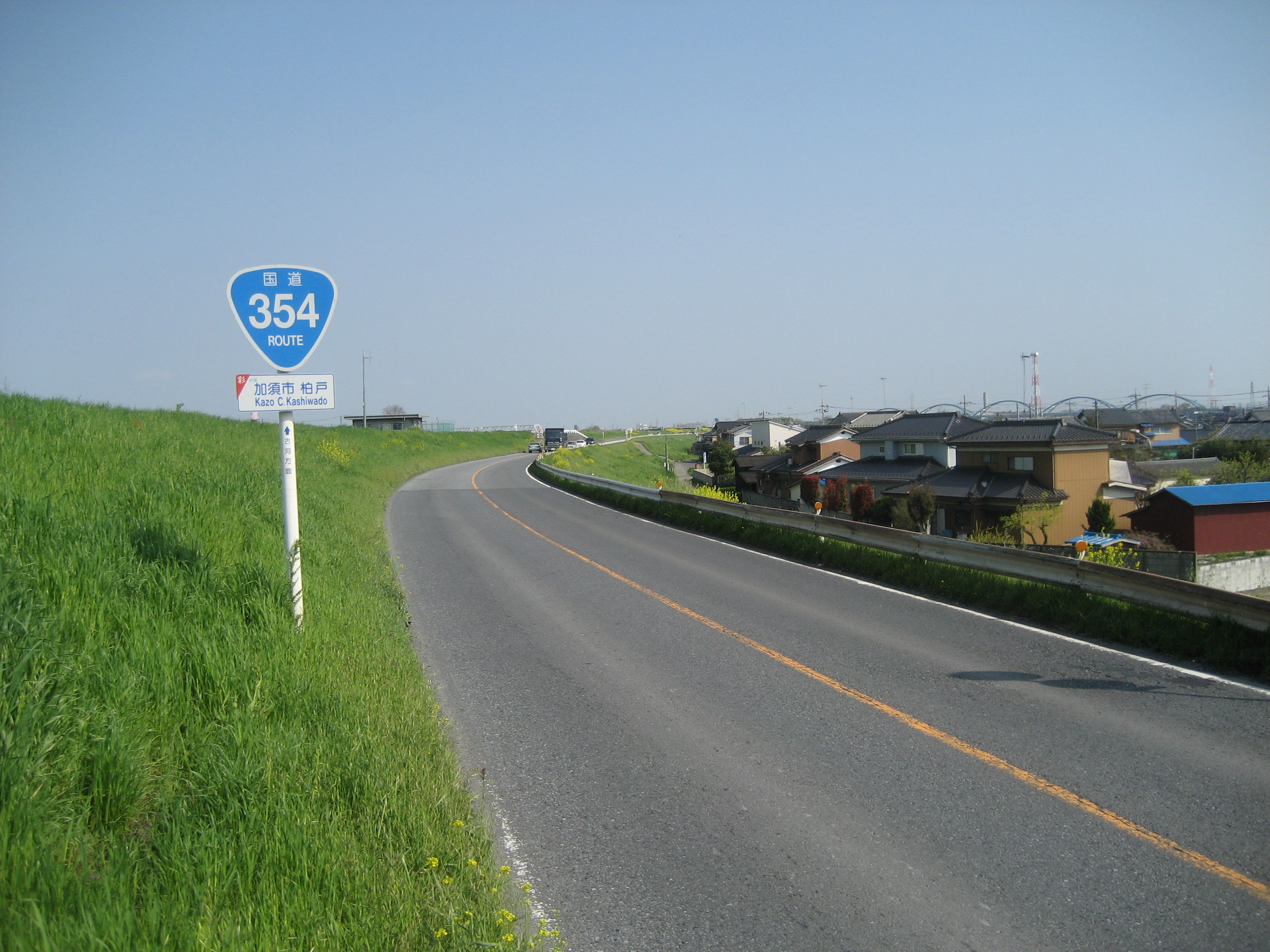

Route information
- Length: 172.8 km (107.4 mi)

Location
- Country: Japan

Highway system
- National highways of Japan; Expressways of Japan
← National Route 353	→ National Route 355

National Route 354 is a national highway of Japan connecting Takasaki, Gunma and Hokota, Ibaraki in Japan, with a total length of 172.8 km (107.37 mi).

== Overview ==
This route runs roughly parallel to the Tone River from near Tamamura Town, Sawa District, Gunma Prefecture, to near Bando City, Ibaraki Prefecture. In Gunma Prefecture, it's a busy route connecting the central/western Gunma region with the eastern Gunma region. However, due to its passage through urban areas and numerous turns, it becomes congested during commuting hours. Therefore, the Higashi-Mo Wide Area Trunk Road, connecting Takasaki City and Itakura Town in Ora District, was constructed as a bypass and fully opened in August 2014, becoming National Route 354. The following year, it was fully widened to four lanes, and most of the old road section was downgraded to Gunma Prefectural Road 142, the Watanuki-Shinozuka Line.

In Ibaraki Prefecture, there are also narrow sections, and congested areas occur in urban areas during commuting hours. Therefore, several bypasses, such as the Sakai-Iwai Bypass, are planned and under construction.

== History ==
April 1, 1975 (Showa 50): Designated and implemented as National Route 354 (Tatebayashi City - Takasaki City). The starting point at the time was the Fujimi-cho (now Akatsuchi-cho) intersection (= intersection with National Route 122, Gunma Prefectural Road/Tochigi Prefectural Road 57 Tatebayashi-Fujioka Line), and the end point was the same as the current starting point. The route length was 53.6 km. The section from the Fujimi-cho intersection to the Ootsutsumi intersection in Koga City, Ibaraki Prefecture (= intersection with National Route 4 Nikko Kaido) was part of Gunma Prefectural Road/Saitama Prefectural Road/Ibaraki Prefectural Road 2 Maebashi-Koga Line.

March 30, 1994 (Heisei 6): Due to road improvements, a bypass road (approximately 2 km) in Tamatsukuri-cho Ko (in front of Tamatsukuri Junior High School - Senboku intersection) opened [8]. April 1: The Kasumigaura Bridge was designated as part of the National Route 354 road area.

August 7, 1997: The Mitsukaido Toll Road (partial section) in Ibaraki Prefecture opens.
