= Ōra District, Gunma =

District in Gunma Prefecture, Japan

Coordinates: 36.2328°N 139.4919°E

Location of Ōra District in Gunma Prefecture

Ōra District (邑楽郡, Ōra-gun) is a rural district located in Gunma Prefecture, Japan. As of January 2015, the district had an estimated population of 103,895 and an area of 132.37 km^{2}, with a population density of 785 people per square kilometer.

== Towns and villages ==
- Chiyoda
- Itakura
- Meiwa
- Ōizumi
- Ōra

The entire city of Tatebayashi was formerly part of the district.

== History ==
The area of Ōra District was formerly part of Kōzuke Province. Per a census conducted at the end of the Edo period, the area was divided into 39 villages administered as tenryō directly by the Tokugawa shogunate, one town (Tatebayashi), 40 villages under the control of Tatebayashi Domain, and one village under Maebashi Domain. Eight villages were under the joint control of the Shogunate and Maebashi Domain, and three villages were under the joint control of the Shogunate and Tatebayashi Domain. One remaining village was under the joint control of the Shogunate and Nishibata Domain in Mikawa Province.

Historic Map of Ōra District in 1889: 1. Tatebayashi, 2. Satoya, 3. Ōshima, 4. Nishiyada, 5. Ebise, 6. Ōgano, 7. Inara, 8. Akabane, 9. Chieda, 10. Umeshima, 11.Sanuki, 12. Rokugō, 13. Minoya, 14. Tominaga, 15. Eiraku, 16. Ōkawa, 17. Koizumi, 18. Takashima, 19. Nakano, 20. Nagae, 21. Tatara 22. Watase

- April 1, 1889 – With the establishment of the municipalities system, the town of Tatebayshi and 21 villages were formed. (1 town, 21 villages)
- July 25, 1902 - The village of Koizumi gained town status. (2 towns, 20 villages)
- 1916 - Population: 83,319. Malaria Patients: 3,609.
- April 1, 1954 - The town of Tatebayashi and the villages of Satoya, Ōshima, Akabane, Rokugō, Minoya, Tatara, and Watarase merged to form the city Tatebayashi. (1 town, 13 villages)
- February 1, 1955 - The villages of Nishiyada, Ebise, Ōgano, and Inara merged to form the town of Itakura. (2 towns, 9 villages)
- March 1, 1955 (2 towns, 6 villages)
  - The villages of Takashima and Nakano merged to form the village of Nakashima.
  - The villages of Chieda, Umeshima, and Sanuki merged to form the village of Meiwa.
- March 31, 1955 - The villages of Tominaga, Eiraku, and Nagae merged to form the village of Chiyoda. (2 towns, 4 villages)
- September 30, 1956 - Parts of the village of Chiyoda (areas of the former village of Nagae) merged into the village of Nakashima.
- January 1, 1957 - The village of Nakashima was renamed Ōra.
- March 31, 1957 - The town of Koizumi and the village of Ōkawa merged to form the town of Ōizumi. (2 towns, 3 villages)
- April 1, 1968 - The village of Ōra gained town status. (3 towns, 2 villages)
- April 1, 1982 - The village of Chiyoda gained town status. (4 towns, 1 village)
- October 1, 1998 - The village of Meiwa gained town status. (5 towns)
