= Nishi-Koizumi Station =

Railway station in Ōizumi, Gunma Prefecture, Japan

TI46 Nishi-Koizumi Station 西小泉駅
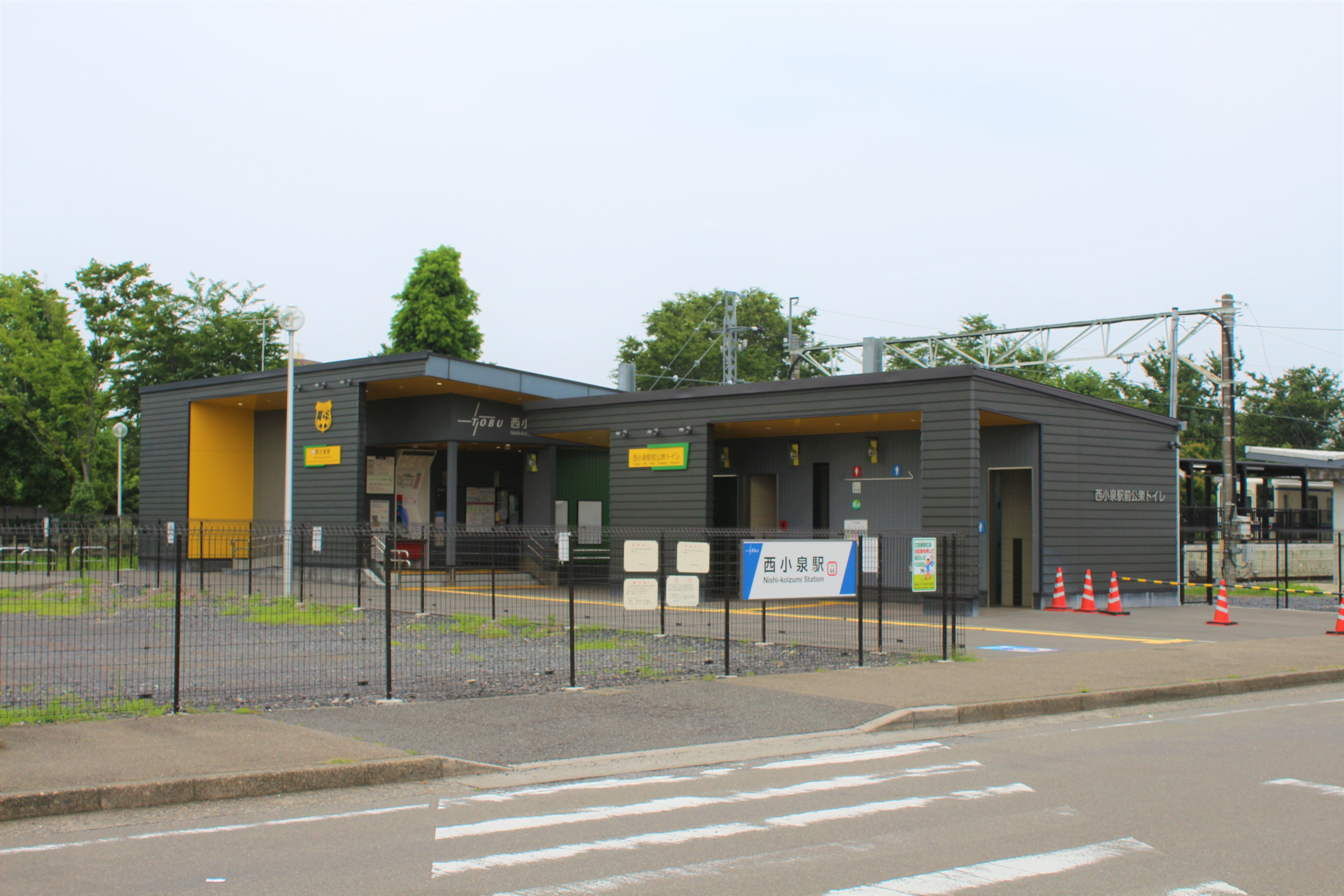
- Nishi-Koizumi Station in June 2020

General information
- Location: 4-31-10 Nishi-Koizumi, Ōizumi-machi, Ōra-gun, Gunma-ken; Japan
- Coordinates: 36°15′30″N 139°24′30″E
- Operator: Tōbu Railway
- Line: Tōbu Koizumi Line
- Distance: 13.2 km from Tatebayashi
- Platforms: 1 island platform

Other information
- Station code: TI-46
- Website: Official website

History
- Opened: December 1, 1941

Passengers
- FY2019: 1523 daily

Services
Preceding station	Tobu Railway	Following station
Koizumimachi TI45 towards Tatebayashi	Koizumi Line	Terminus
Location
- Location within Gunma Prefecture Location within Japan

Nishi-Koizumi Station (西小泉駅, Nishi-Koizumi-eki) is a passenger railway station in the town of Ōizumi, Gunma, Japan, operated by the private railway operator Tōbu Railway. It is numbered "TI-46".

== Lines ==
Nishi-Koizumi Station is a terminal station of the Tōbu Koizumi Line, and is located 13.2 kilometers from the opposing terminus of the line at Tatebayashi.

== Station layout ==
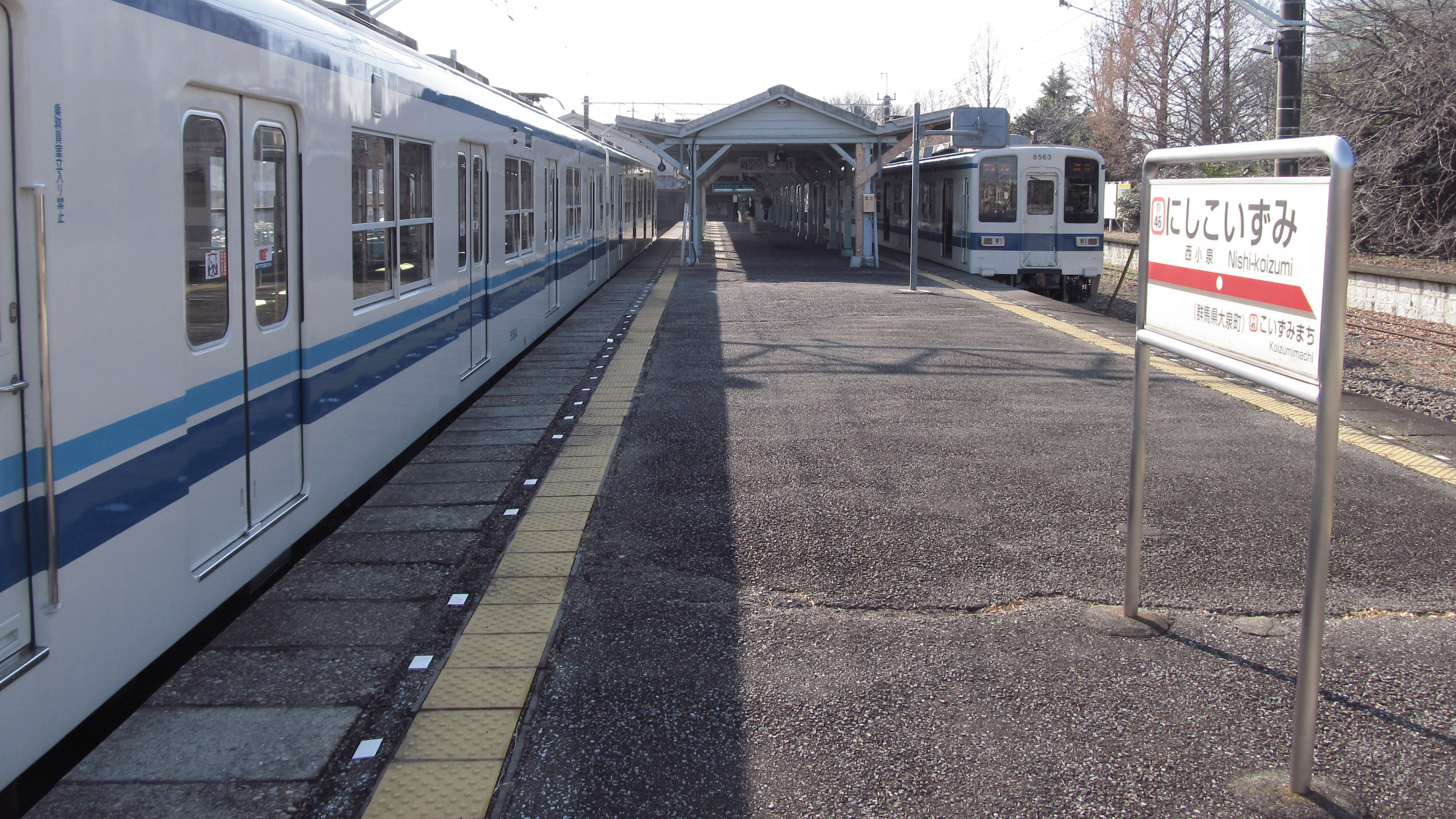
The platform

The station consists of a single dead-headed island platform connected to the station building by a footbridge.

=== Platforms ===
1,2	■ Tōbu Koizumi Line	for Higashi-Koizumi for Tatebayashi

== History ==
The first station was originally opened to serve the Koizumi plant of Nakajima Aircraft Company as a station of Sengoku-Kashi Freight Line operated by Tōbu Railway company on December 1, 1941. There were 32 services of a day between Nishi-Koizumi station and Ōta Station.

From March 17, 2012, station numbering was introduced on all Tōbu lines, with Nishi-Koizumi Station becoming "TI-46".

== Passenger statistics ==
In fiscal 2019, the station was used by an average of 1523 passengers daily (boarding passengers only).

== Surrounding area ==
- Sanyo Electric factory
- Subaru Ōizumi factory
- Ōizumi Town Hall
- Oizumi College of Social Workers

== See also ==
- List of railway stations in Japan
