= Kenshōin =

Kenshōin may refer to:

- Yamauchi Chiyo, a Japanese noble lady from the end of the Muromachi period to the early Edo period, was the wife of Yamauchi Kazutoyo. Took Kenshōin as a religious name.
- Kenshōin (Takeda), daughter of Takeda Shingen and wife of Anayama Nobutada.
- Kenshō-in (Kumagaya), a Zen Buddhist temple in Kumagaya, Saitama Prefecture, Japan.
