= Aketo Station =

Railway station in Fukaya, Saitama Prefecture, Japan

CR14 Aketo Station 明戸駅
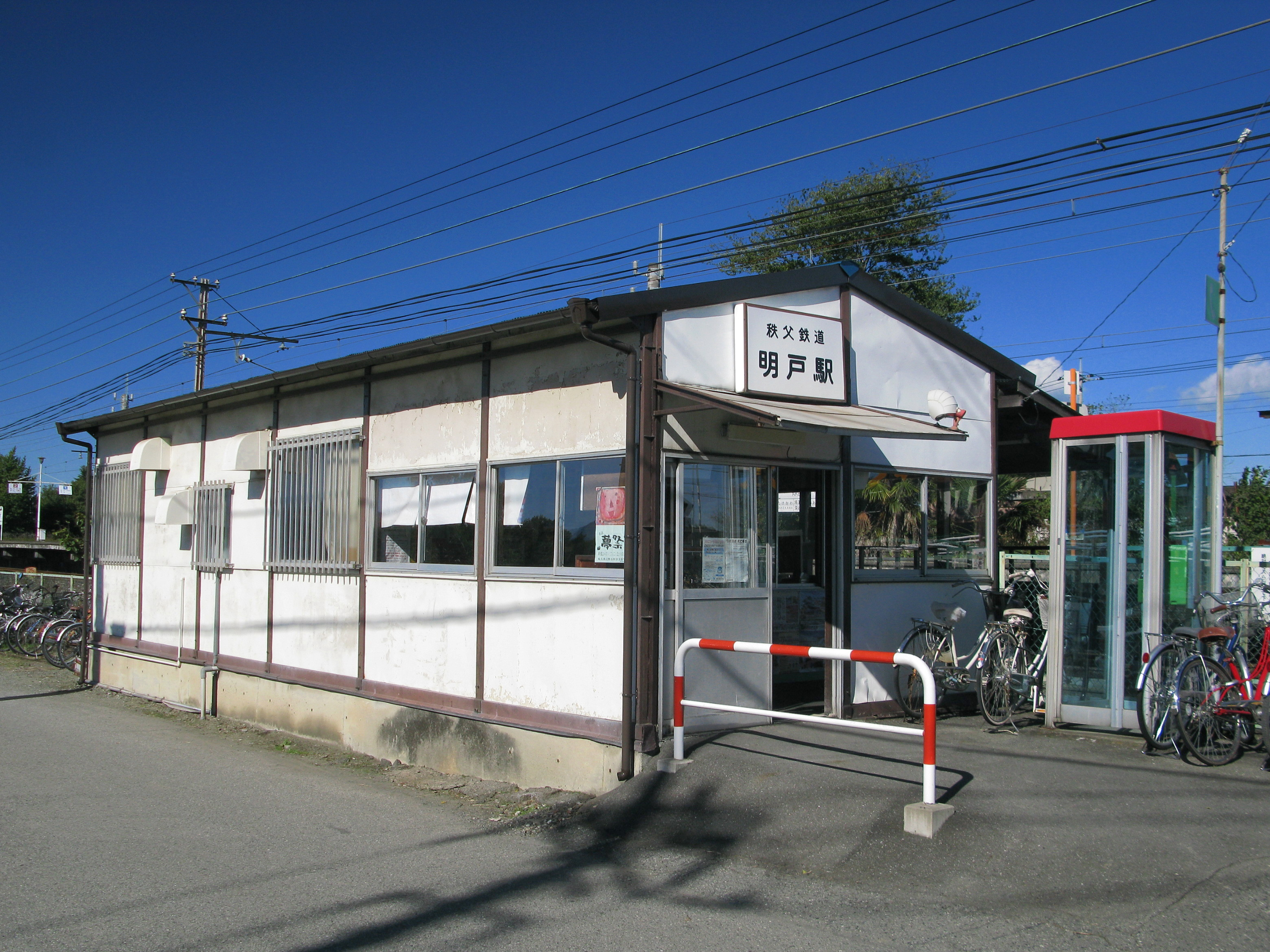
- Aketo Station, November 2012

General information
- Location: 578-8 Seyama, Fukaya-shi, Saitama-ken 369-1103; Japan
- Coordinates: 36°8′34.6″N 139°18′13.62″E
- Operator: Chichibu Railway
- Line: ■ Chichibu Main Line
- Distance: 22.9 km from Hanyū
- Platforms: 1 island platform

Other information
- Website: Official website

History
- Opened: March 14, 1985

Passengers
- FY2018: 393 daily

Services
Preceding station	Chichibu Railway	Following station
Takekawa CR15 towards Mitsumineguchi	Chichibu Main Line Local	Ōasō CR13 towards Hanyū
Location
- Location within Saitama Prefecture Location within Japan

Aketo Station (明戸駅, Aketo-eki) is a passenger railway station located in the city of Fukaya, Saitama, Japan, operated by the private railway operator Chichibu Railway.

== Lines ==
Aketo Station is served by the Chichibu Main Line from Hanyū to Mitsumineguchi, and is located 22.9 km from Hanyū.

== Station layout ==
The station is staffed and consists of a single island platform serving two tracks.

=== Platforms ===
1	■ Chichibu Main Line	for Kumagaya and Hanyū
2	■ Chichibu Main Line	for Yorii, Chichibu and Mitsumineguchi

== History ==
The station opened on March 14, 1985.

== Passenger statistics ==
In fiscal 2018, the station was used by an average of 393 passengers daily.

== Surrounding area ==
- Arakawa River
- National Route 140
