= Bombing of Kumagaya =

The bombing of Kumagaya (熊谷空襲, Kumagaya-kūshū) on 14 August 1945, was part of the strategic bombing campaign waged by the United States of America against military and civilian targets and population centers during the Japan home islands campaign in the closing stages of the Pacific War in 1945.

== Background ==
Although the Japanese government had already agreed to accept the terms of the Potsdam Declaration and unconditionally surrender to the Allies on 14 August, the United States Army Air Forces had already launched another bombing mission against the Japanese cities of Isesaki, Gunma and Kumagaya, Saitama, and would not call off the raid as the surrender has not yet been officially accepted by the United States government. The crews of the 314th Bombardment Wing were aware that the war was all but over, and in the words of New York Herald Tribune correspondent Homer Bigart, no one wanted to die over a target that was "a pathetically small city of little obvious importance".

At the time, the city of Kumagaya lacked major targets of military significance, except for some aircraft components manufacturing for Nakajima Aircraft Company and the Imperial Japanese Army’s Kumagaya Air Academy. Per the 1940 census, the city had an estimated population of 45,000.

== Air raids ==
On 14 August 1945, 77 Boeing B-29 Superfortress bombers of the 314th Bombardment Wing and 16 B-29s of the 313th Bombardment Squadron launched from bases in Guam The lead aircraft carried six 1,000 lb high explosive bombs rigged for an air burst over the city. The plan was that the inhabitants of the city would seek shelter underground, whereby the remaining aircraft would attack in a box-pattern from all sides to incinerate the trapped civilians. In addition, it was hoped that the noise of the explosion would be so great that the Japanese authorities would believe that the city had been annihilated by a nuclear weapon.

Four aircraft were forced to abort due to mechanical issues, and the remaining 89 aircraft arrived over target at 0023 on 15 August in clear weather. Bombing continued to 0139 AM, from an altitude of 14,000 to 17,000 feet with 356 M17, 1372 M19 and 6321 M47 incendiary bombs dropped. The total amount of bombs dropped was thus 96,833 tons of bombs per square mile, or over three times the average amount dropped on other Japanese cities during the war.

The Japanese made no resistance, and all attacking aircraft returned safely, with five aircraft diverting to Iwo Jima due to mechanical issues.

The resultant firestorm destroyed most of Kumagaya, with 74% of the city area destroyed. This included 3630 structures, or 40% of the buildings in the city, including the main hall of the Kenshō-in temple. Casualties included 266 civilian deaths, and over 3000 injured, or approximately 28% of the city population. The Emperor’s Gyokuon-hōsō confirming Allied acceptance of the surrender of Japan was made on noon of 15 August, Japan time.

== See also ==
- Evacuations of civilians in Japan during World War II

== Bibliography ==
- Wainstock, Dennis (1996). The Decision to Drop the Atomic Bomb. Greenwood Publishing Group. ISBN 0-275-95475-7.
- Werrell, Kenneth P (1996). Blankets of Fire. Washington and London: Smithsonian Institution Press. ISBN 1-56098-665-4.
- Carter, Kit C (1975). The Army Air Forces in World War II: Combat Chronology, 1941-1945. DIANE Publishing. ISBN 1-4289-1543-5.
- Crane, Conrad C. (1994). The Cigar that brought the Fire Wind: Curtis LeMay and the Strategic Bombing of Japan. JGSDF-U.S. Army Military History Exchange. ASIN B0006PGEIQ.
- Bradley, F. J. (1999). No Strategic Targets Left. Contribution of Major Fire Raids Toward Ending WWII. Turner Publishing. ISBN 1-56311-483-6.
- Hoyt, Edwin P. (2000). Inferno: The Fire Bombing of Japan, March 9 – August 15, 1945. Madison Books. ISBN 1-56833-149-5.
- Frank, Richard B. (2001). Downfall: The End of the Imperial Japanese Empire. Penguin. ISBN 0-14-100146-1.
- Grayling, A. C. (2007). Among the Dead Cities: The History and Moral Legacy of the WWII Bombing of Civilians in Germany and Japan. New York: Walker Publishing Company Inc. ISBN 978-0-8027-1565-4.
