= Kami-Kumagaya Station =

Railway station in Kumagaya, Saitama Prefecture, Japan

CR10 Kami-Kumagaya Station 上熊谷駅
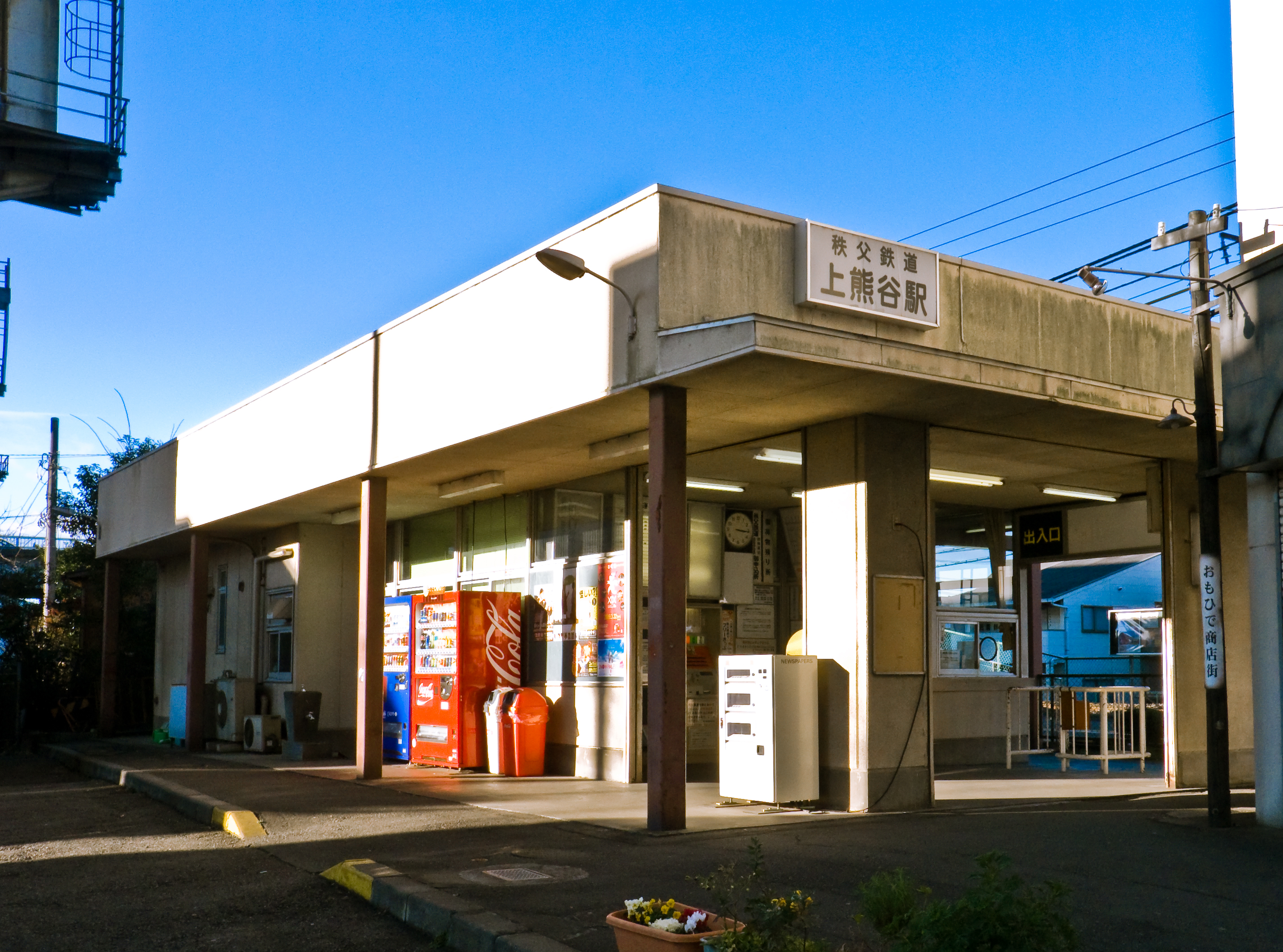
- Kami-Kumagaya Station building, January 2009

General information
- Location: 255–1 Miyamoto-chō, Kumagaya, Saitama-ken 360-0822; Japan
- Coordinates: 36°08′33″N 139°22′53″E
- Operator: Chichibu Railway
- Line: ■ Chichibu Main Line
- Distance: 15.8 km from Hanyū
- Platforms: 1 island platform

Other information
- Website: Official website

History
- Opened: 1 April 1933
- Former names: Kamakura-machi (1 April to 1 July 1933)

Passengers
- FY2018: 898 daily

Services
Preceding station	Chichibu Railway	Following station
Ishiwara CR11 towards Mitsumineguchi	Chichibu Main Line Local	Kumagaya CR09 towards Hanyū
Location
- Location within Saitama Prefecture Location within Japan

Kami-Kumagaya Station (上熊谷駅, Kami-Kumagaya-eki) is a passenger railway station located in the city of Kumagaya, Saitama, Japan, operated by the private railway operator Chichibu Railway.

== Lines ==
Kami-Kumagaya Station is served by the single-track Chichibu Main Line from Hanyū to Mitsumineguchi, and is located 15.8 km from Hanyū.

The station was also served by the non-electrified 10.1 km single-track Tobu Kumagaya Line from Kumagaya to Menuma until it closed on 31 May 1983.

== Station layout ==
The station is staffed and consists of a single island platform serving one bidirectional track. The platform is situated between the elevated Joetsu Shinkansen tracks and the JR Takasaki Line tracks, and the track of the former Tobu Kumagaya Line still remains alongside the now fenced-off rear face of the platform.

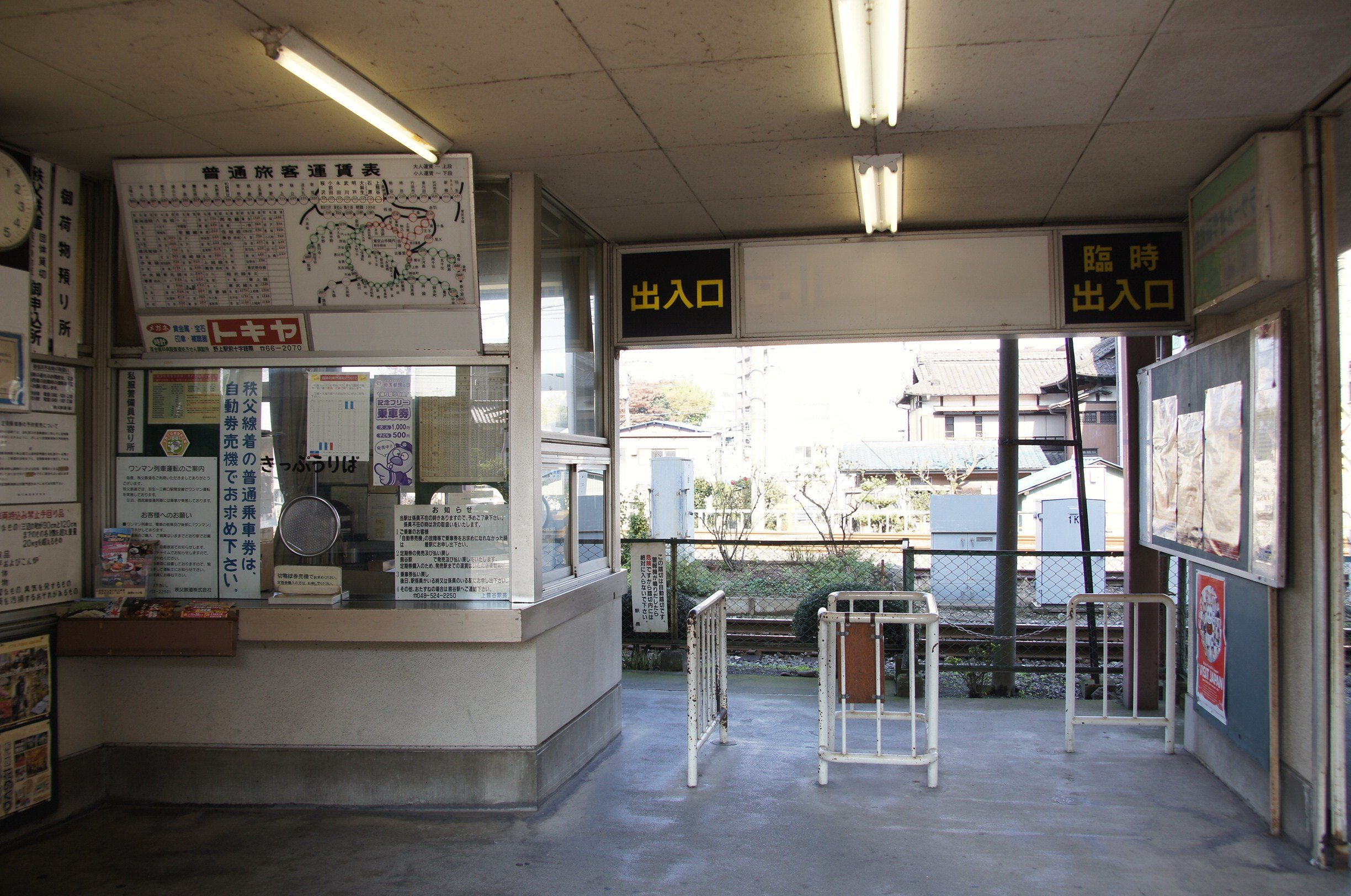
Ticket office and entrance to platform

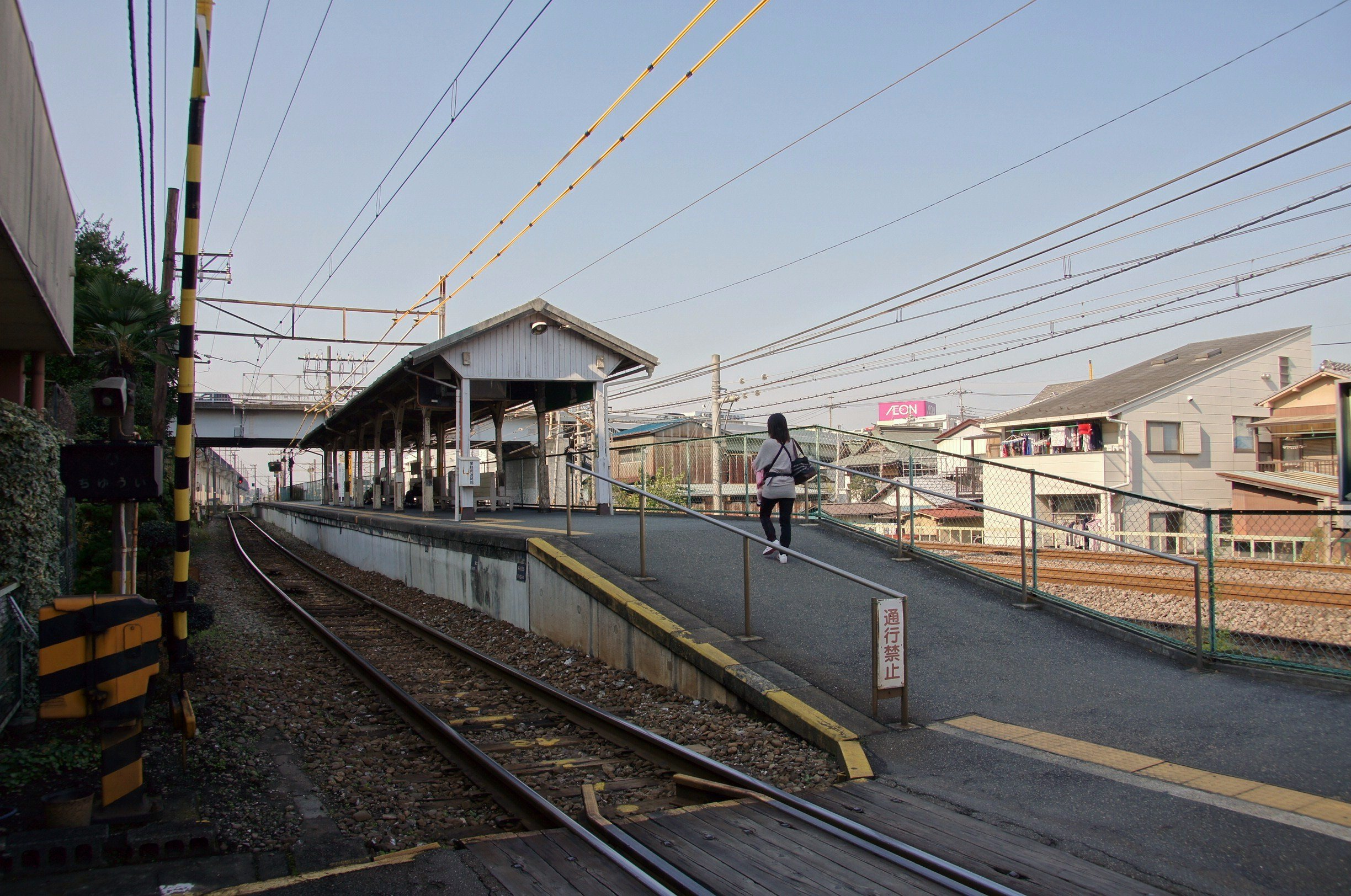
View of the platform and passenger crossing

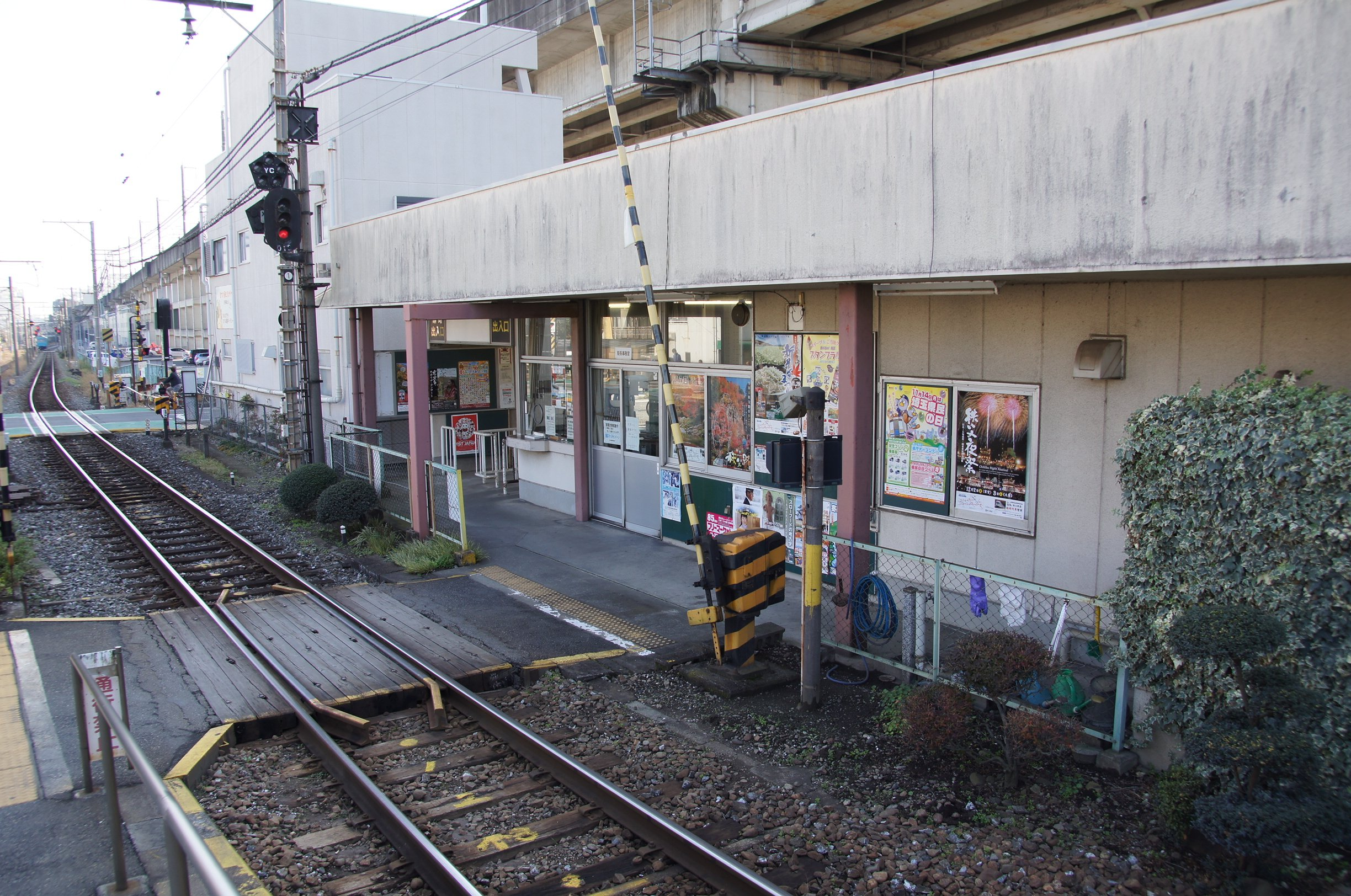
View of the exit from the platform

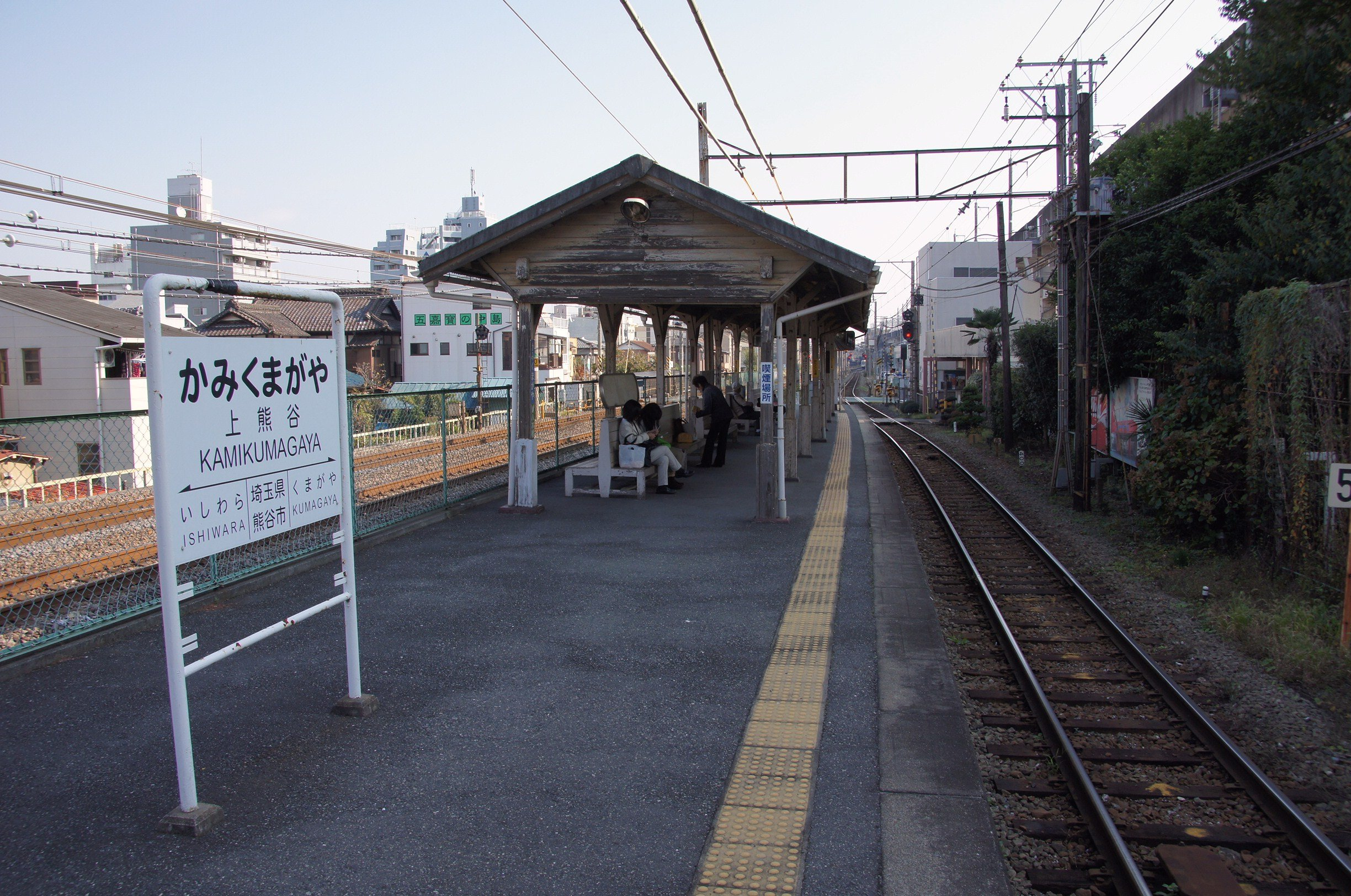
View of the platform looking eastward toward Kumagaya

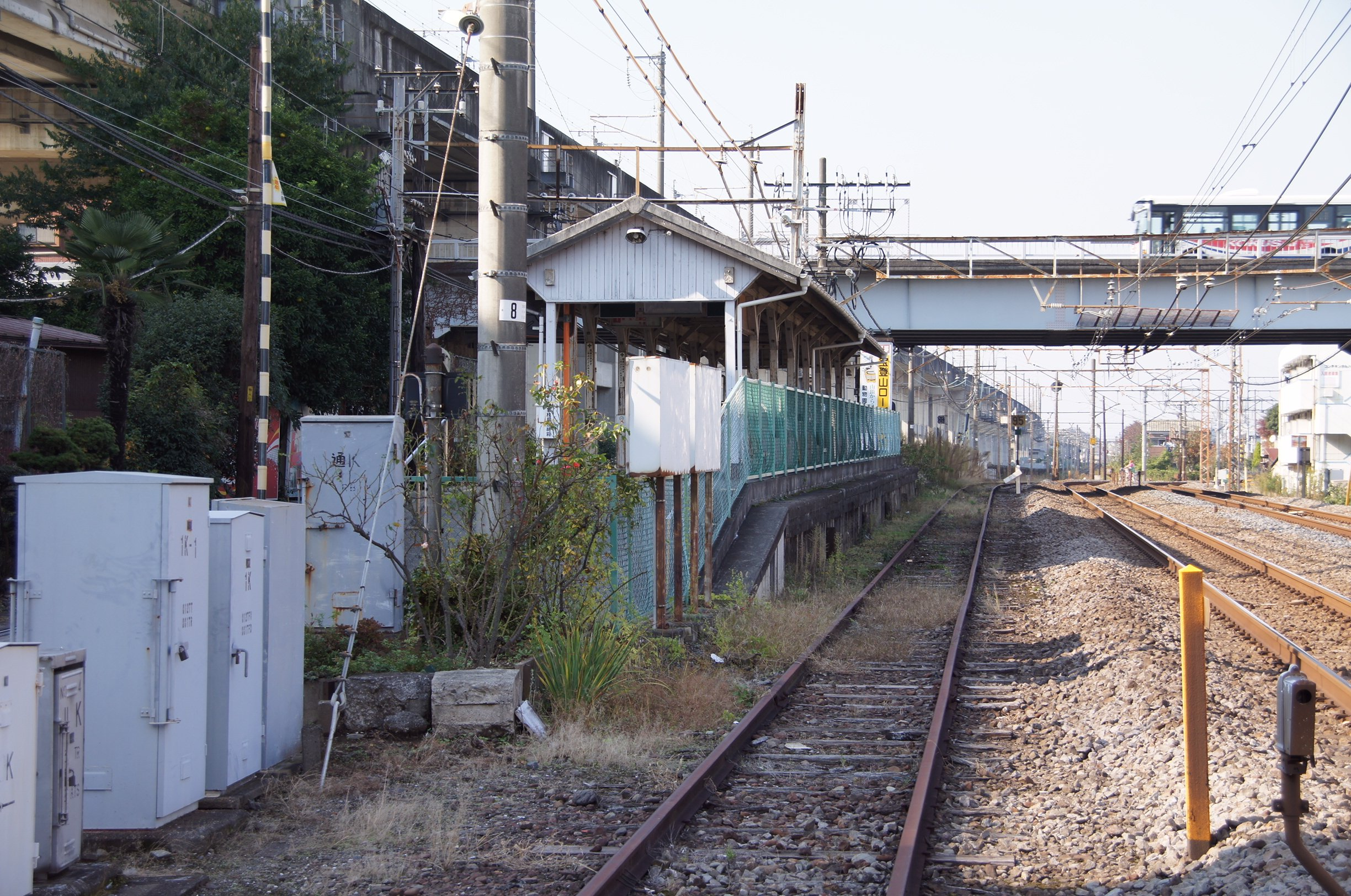
The disused track of the former Tobu Kumagaya Line alongside the station platform

== History ==
Kami-Kumagawa Station opened on 1 April 1933 as Kamakura-machi Station (鎌倉町駅). It was renamed Kami-Kumagaya from 1 July 1933.

The Tobu Kumagaya Line closed on 31 May 1983.

== Passenger statistics ==
In the 2018 fiscal year, the station was used by an average of 898 passengers daily.

== Surrounding area ==
- Aeon Shopping Centre
- Yagihashi Department Store
- Yūkokuji Temple

== See also ==
- List of railway stations in Japan
