= Tobu Kumagaya Line =

Former railway line operated by Tobu Railway in Japan

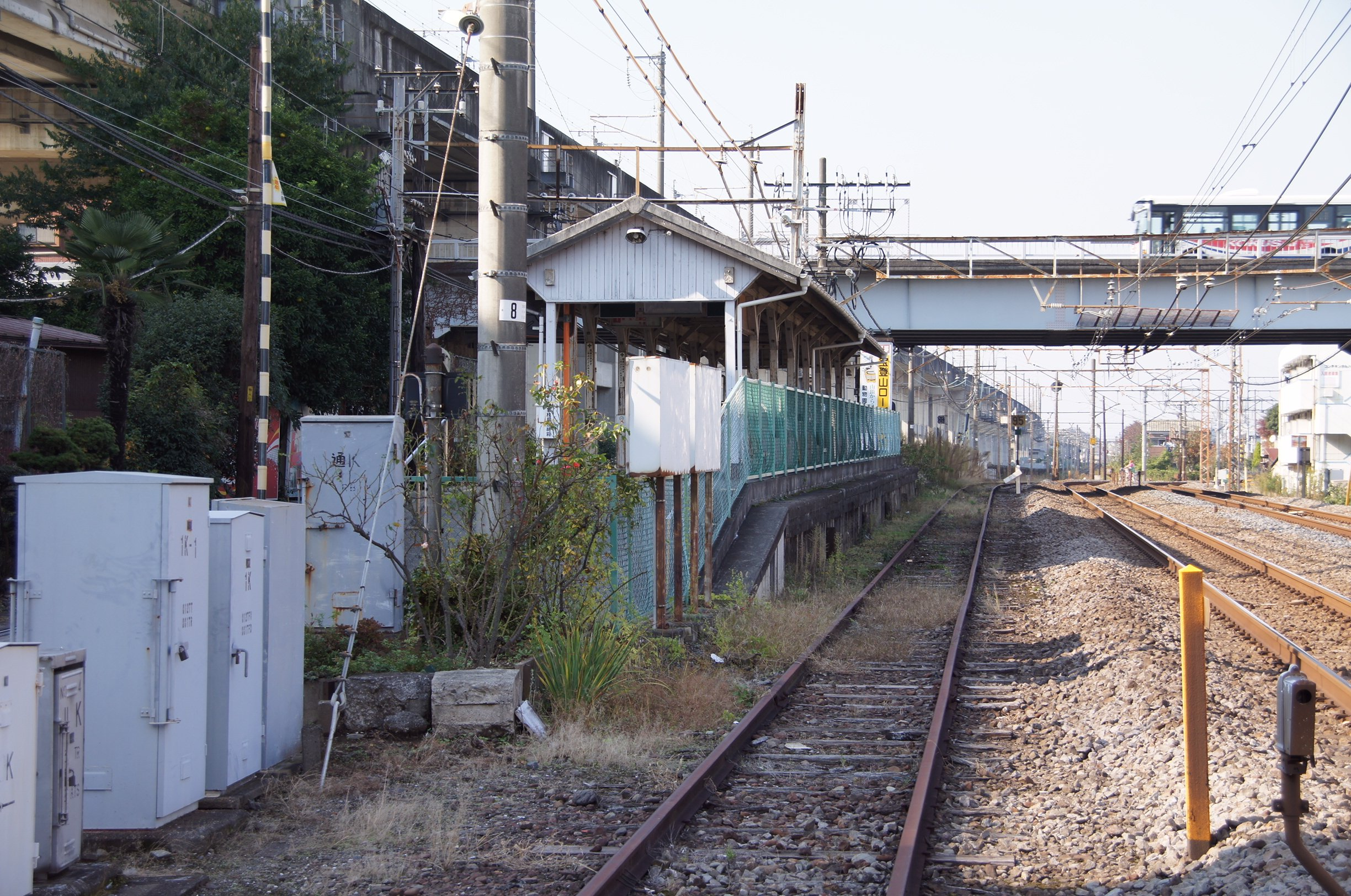
- Disused track of the former Tobu Kumagaya Line at Kami-Kumagaya Station in November 2011

Overview
- Native name: 東武熊谷線
- Owner: Tobu Railway
- Locale: Saitama Prefecture
- Termini: Kumagaya; Menuma
- Stations: 4

Service
- Type: Heavy rail
- Depot(s): None
- Rolling stock: Tobu KiHa 2000 series

History
- Opened: 1943
- Closed: 1983

Technical
- Line length: 10.1 km (6.3 mi)
- Number of tracks: 1
- Track gauge: 1,067 mm (3 ft 6 in)
- Electrification: Not electrified

The Tobu Kumagaya Line (東武熊谷線, Tōbu Kumagaya-sen) was a 10.1 km single-track line operated by Tobu Railway, which ran from Kumagaya to Menuma in Saitama Prefecture between 1943 and 1983.

== History ==
Construction of the line was planned during the Pacific War to provide transportation for the military supply factories located in the area. It opened on 5 December 1943, although the shortage of materials during the war meant that the rails for the line had to be procured by singling the Tobu Nikko Line between Kassemba and Tobu Nikko Stations. The original plan to extend the line beyond Menuma over the Tone River to the freight terminal at Shin-Koizumi (on the now closed Sengokugashi Freight Line extending from the Tobu Koizumi Line at Nishi-Koizumi) was cancelled following the end of the war.

The line was not linked to any other Tobu lines, and remained unprofitable. It was finally closed on 31 May 1983.

Some of the former Kumagaya Line track remains in situ between Kumagaya and Kami-Kumagaya on the Chichibu Main Line, as does one of the concrete piers for the planned Tone River bridge, on the Gunma Prefecture side of the river.

== Stations ==
Station	Japanese	Distance (km)	Passenger statistics (Note: Average number of daily passengers for fiscal 1978)	Remarks
Kumagaya	熊谷	0.0	1,716	Staffed (Note: Staffed by Chichibu Railway personnel)
Kami-Kumagaya	上熊谷	0.9	150	Staffed
Ōhata	大幡	4.4	704	Unstaffed
Menuma	妻沼	10.1	1,452	Staffed

== Rolling stock ==
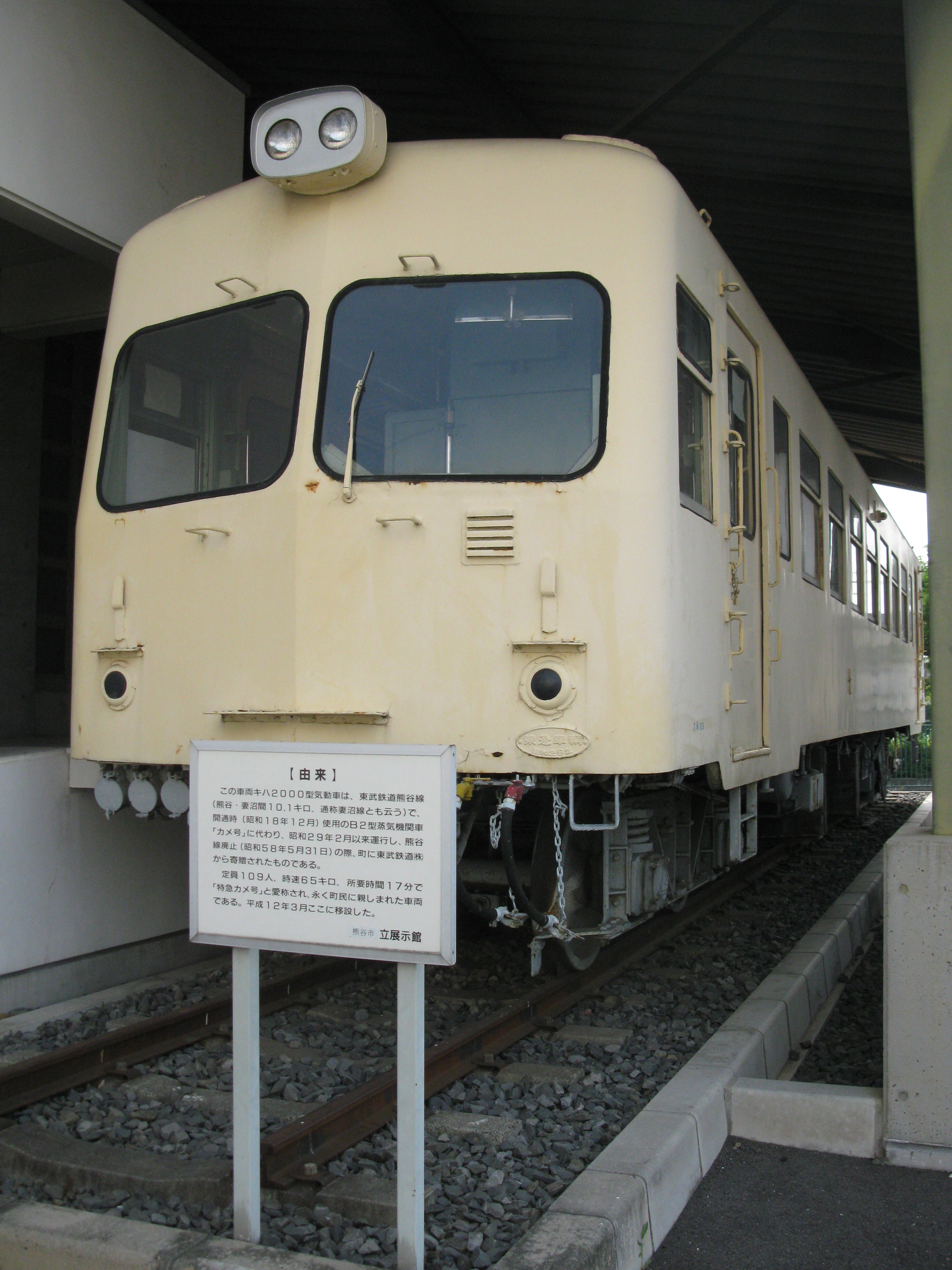
Preserved KiHa 2000 series diesel railcar formerly used on the Kumagaya Line, August 2011

The line was initially operated using Class B2 (ex-JNR Class 5300) Beyer, Peacock & Company-built steam locomotives (numbers 27 and 28, ex-JNR 5312 and 5313) hauling former DeHa 1 electric cars converted to non-powered passenger coaches. A fleet of three new KiHa 2000 series diesel railcars built by Tokyu Car was introduced from February 1954. These were initially painted in Japanese National Railways-style blue and cream, but from June 1963, they were repainted into the Tobu livery of "royal beige" and "international orange". From February 1972, the three railcars were repainted into the Tobu livery of all-over "sage cream".

== See also ==
- List of railway lines in Japan
