= Ishiwara Station =

Railway station in Kumagaya, Saitama Prefecture, Japan

CR11 Ishiwara Station 石原駅
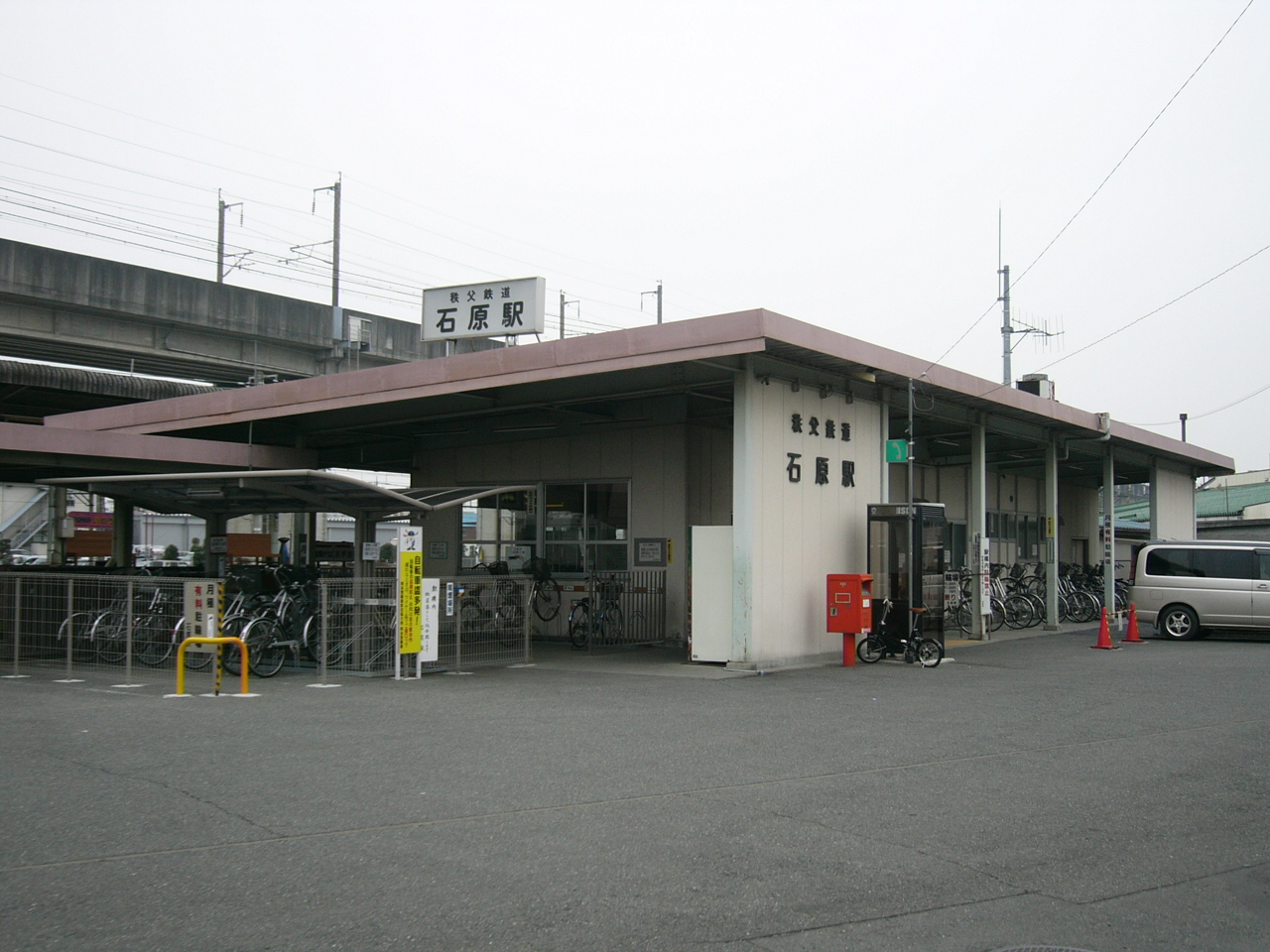
- Ishiwara Station, March 2006

General information
- Location: 1485-1 Ishihara, Kumagaya-shi, Saitama-ken 360-0816; Japan
- Coordinates: 36°08′53″N 139°22′07″E
- Operator: Chichibu Railway
- Line: ■ Chichibu Main Line
- Distance: 17.0 km from Hanyū
- Platforms: 1 island platform

Other information
- Website: Official website

History
- Opened: 7 October 1901

Passengers
- FY2018: 1027 daily

Services
Preceding station	Chichibu Railway	Following station
Hirose-Yachō-no-Mori CR12 towards Mitsumineguchi	Chichibu Main Line Local	Kami-Kumagaya CR10 towards Hanyū
Location
- Location within Saitama Prefecture Location within Japan

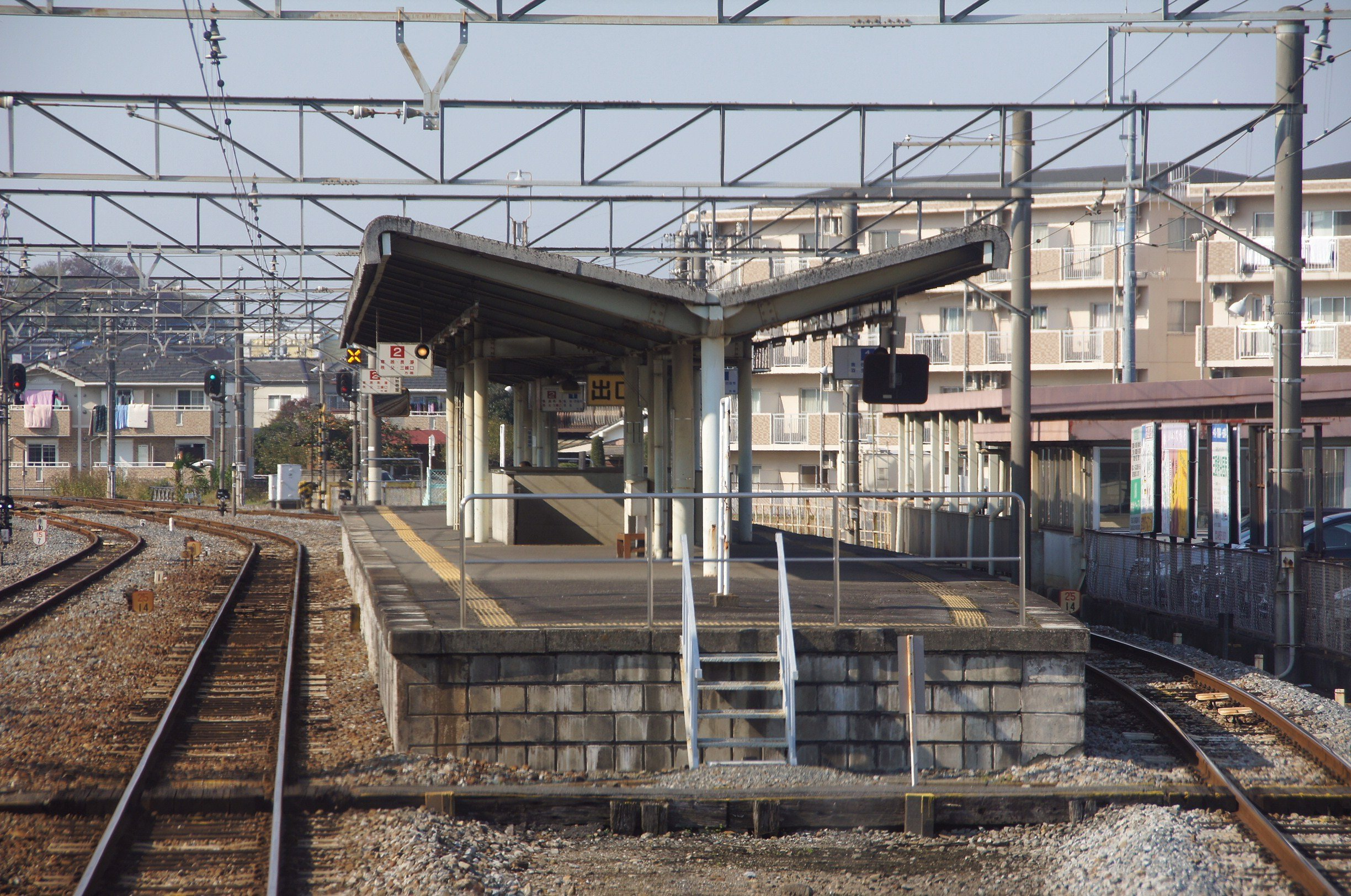
Ishiwara Station viewed from an approaching train from the Kumagaya direction, November 2011

Ishiwara Station (石原駅, Ishiwara-eki) is a passenger railway station located in the city of Kumagaya, Saitama, Japan, operated by the private railway operator Chichibu Railway.

== Lines ==
Ishiwara Station is served by the Chichibu Main Line from Hanyū to Mitsumineguchi, and is located 17.0 km from Hanyū.

== Station layout ==
The station is staffed and consists of a single island platform serving two tracks. The station building and entrance is connected to the platforms by an underground passage. Two freight sidings lie to the south of the platform tracks.

=== Platforms ===
1	■ Chichibu Main Line	for Kumagaya and Hanyū
2	■ Chichibu Main Line	for Yorii, Chichibu and Mitsumineguchi

== History ==
Ishiwara Station opened on 7 October 1901.

== Passenger statistics ==
In fiscal 2018, the station was used by an average of 1027 passengers daily.

== Surrounding area ==
- Saitama Kumagaya High School
- Saitama Kumagaya Agricultural High School

== See also ==
- List of railway stations in Japan
