= Ōasō Station =

Railway station in Kumagaya, Saitama Prefecture, Japan

CR13 Ōasō Station 大麻生駅
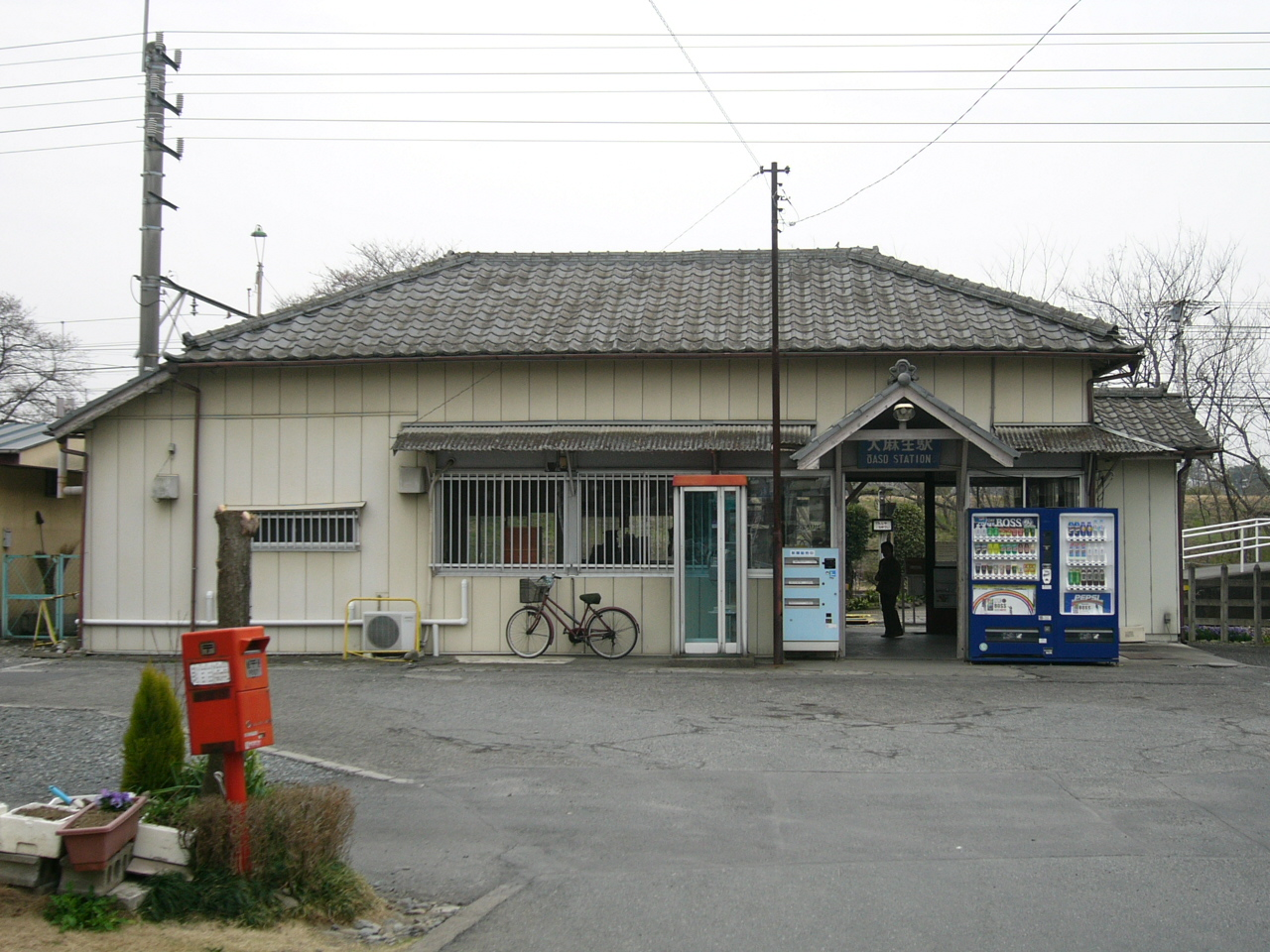
- Ōasō Station, March 2006

General information
- Location: 1921-6 Ōasō, Kumagaya-shi, Saitama-ken 360-0835; Japan
- Coordinates: 36°08′41″N 139°19′56″E
- Operator: Chichibu Railway
- Line: ■ Chichibu Main Line
- Distance: 59.7 km from Hanyū
- Platforms: 1 island platform
- Connections: Bus stop

Other information
- Website: Official website

History
- Opened: 7 October 1901

Passengers
- FY2018: 235 daily

Services
Preceding station	Chichibu Railway	Following station
Aketo CR14 towards Mitsumineguchi	Chichibu Main Line Local	Hirose-Yachō-no-Mori CR12 towards Hanyū
Location
- Location within Saitama Prefecture Location within Japan

Ōasō Station (大麻生駅, Ōasō-eki) is a passenger railway station located in the city of Kumagaya, Saitama, Japan, operated by the private railway operator Chichibu Railway.

== Lines ==
Ōasō Station is served by the Chichibu Main Line from Hanyū to Mitsumineguchi, and is located 20.3 km from Hanyū.

== Station layout ==
The station is staffed and consists of a single island platform serving two tracks. A bidirectional freight loop and an additional siding lie to the south of the platform tracks.

=== Platforms ===
1	■ Chichibu Main Line	for Kumagaya and Hanyū
2	■ Chichibu Main Line	for Yorii, Chichibu and Mitsumineguchi

== History ==
Ōasō Station opened on 7 October 1901.

== Passenger statistics ==
In fiscal 2018, the station was used by an average of 235 passengers daily.

== Surrounding area ==
- Hirosegawara Depot
- Arakawa River
- Arakara Ōasō Wild Bird Park
- National Route 140

== See also ==
- List of railway stations in Japan
