= Hirose-Yachō-no-Mori Station =

Railway station in Kumagaya, Saitama Prefecture, Japan

CR12 Hirose-Yachō-no-Mori Station ひろせ野鳥の森駅
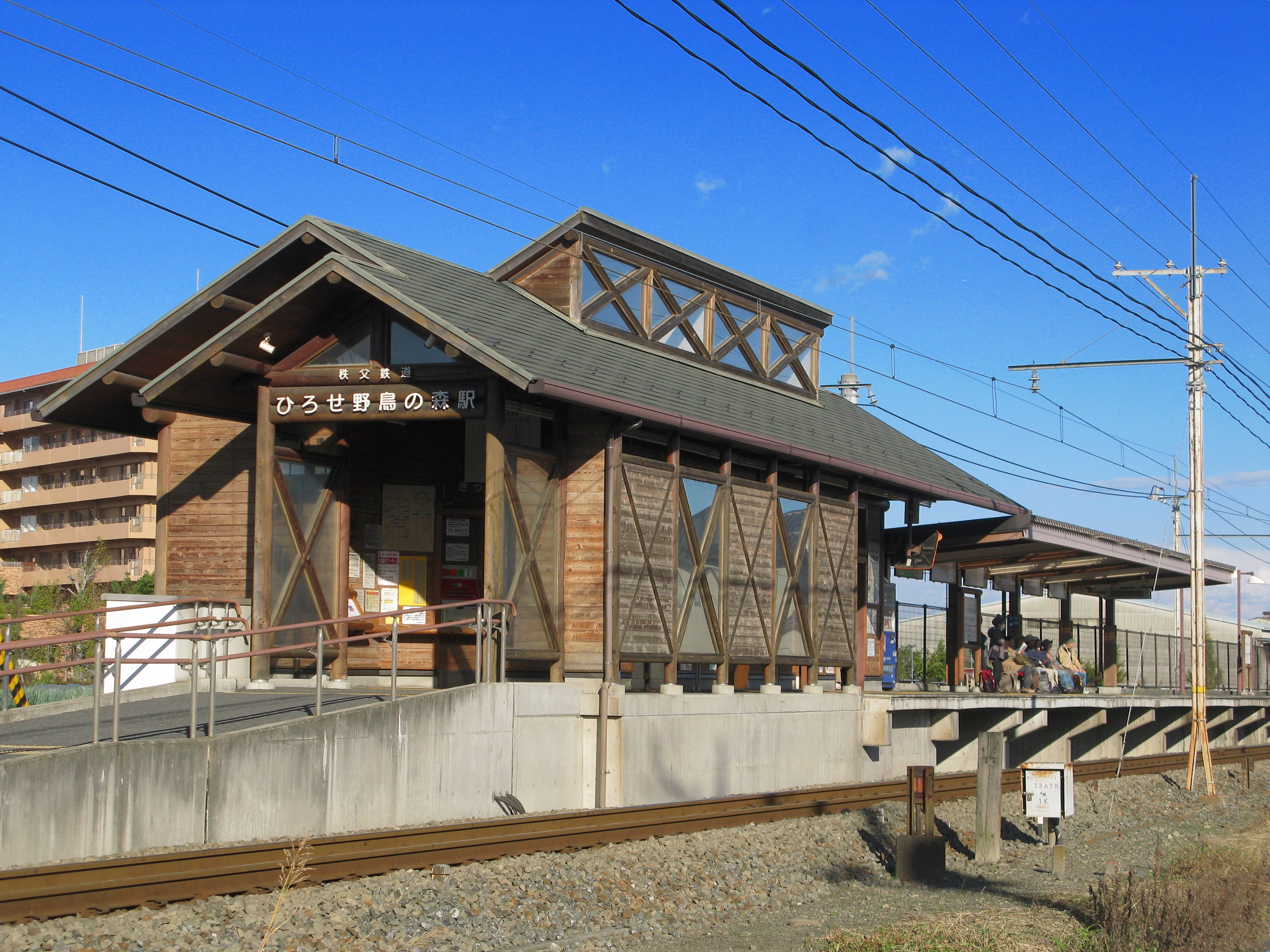
- Hirose-Yachō-no-Mori Station, November 2012

General information
- Location: 1040-1 Hirose, Kumagaya-shi, Saitama-ken 360-0833; Japan
- Coordinates: 36°8′46.1″N 139°21′5.37″E
- Operator: Chichibu Railway
- Line: ■ Chichibu Main Line
- Distance: 18.5 km from Hanyū
- Platforms: 1 side platform

Other information
- Website: Official website

History
- Opened: 27 March 2003

Passengers
- FY2018: 1219 daily

Services
Preceding station	Chichibu Railway	Following station
Ōasō CR13 towards Mitsumineguchi	Chichibu Main Line Local	Ishiwara CR11 towards Hanyū
Location
- Location within Saitama Prefecture Location within Japan

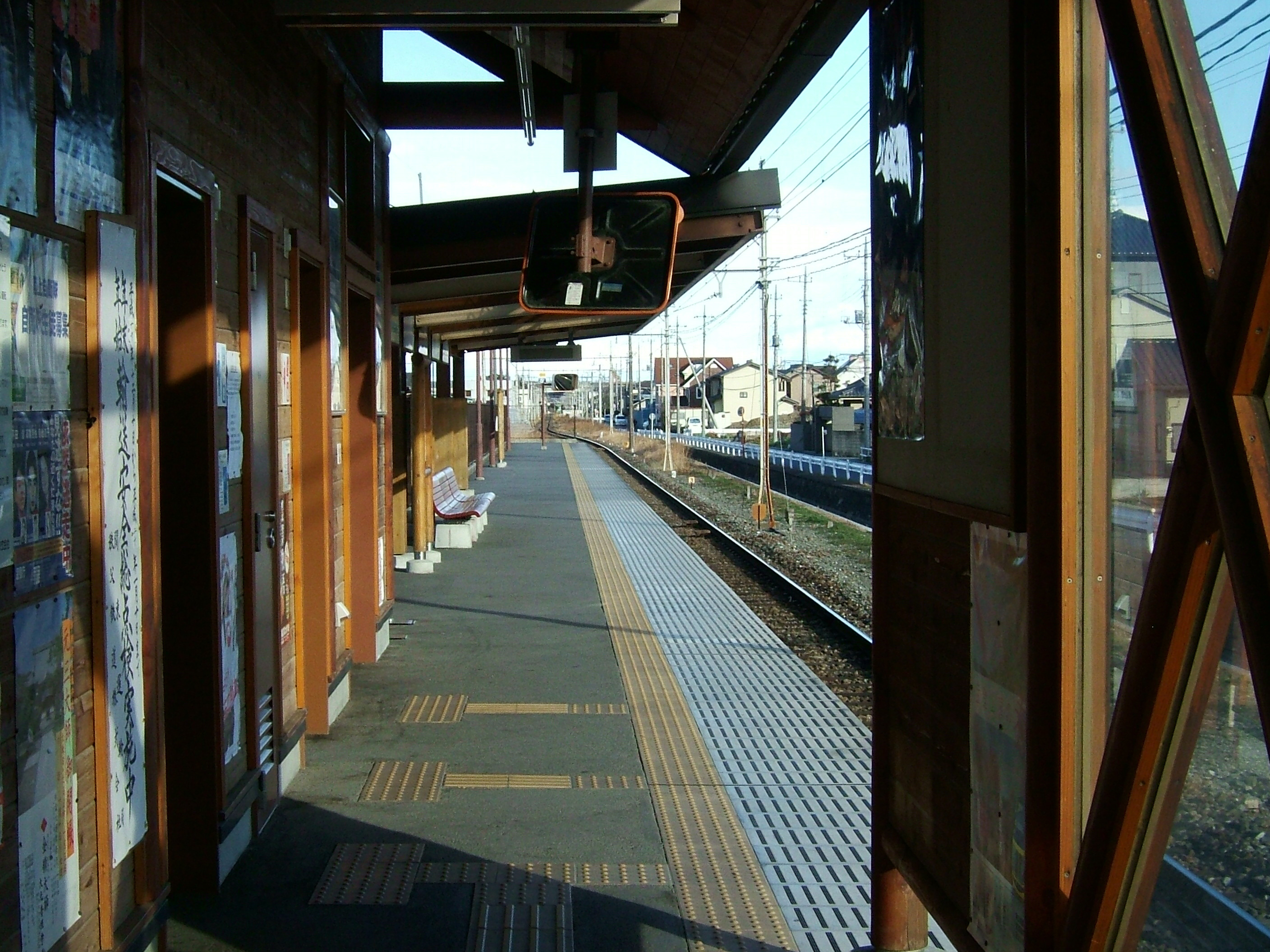
The station platform in January 2008

Hirose-Yachō-no-Mori Station (ひろせ野鳥の森駅, Hirose-Yachō-no-Mori-eki) is a passenger railway station located in the city of Kumagaya, Saitama, Japan, operated by the private railway operator Chichibu Railway.

== Lines ==
Hirose-Yachō-no-Mori Station is served by the Chichibu Main Line from Hanyū to Mitsumineguchi, and is located 18.5 km from Hanyū.

== Station layout ==
The station is staffed and consists of a single side platform serving a bidirectional track. The log cabin-style station building has a small ticket office, but like all the other Chichibu Mainline stations, there is no ticket barrier. There is a waiting room and toilets, complete with disabled facilities.

== History ==
Hirose-Yachō-no-Mori Station opened on 27 March 2003. Its name was chosen from among candidates submitted by 174 residents and those with workplaces in Kumagaya city.

== Accidents ==
On 15 June 2006 at 18:26, an elderly male passenger died after jumping from the platform in front of an approaching train.

== Passenger statistics ==
In fiscal 2018, the station was used by an average of 1219 passengers daily.

== Surrounding area ==
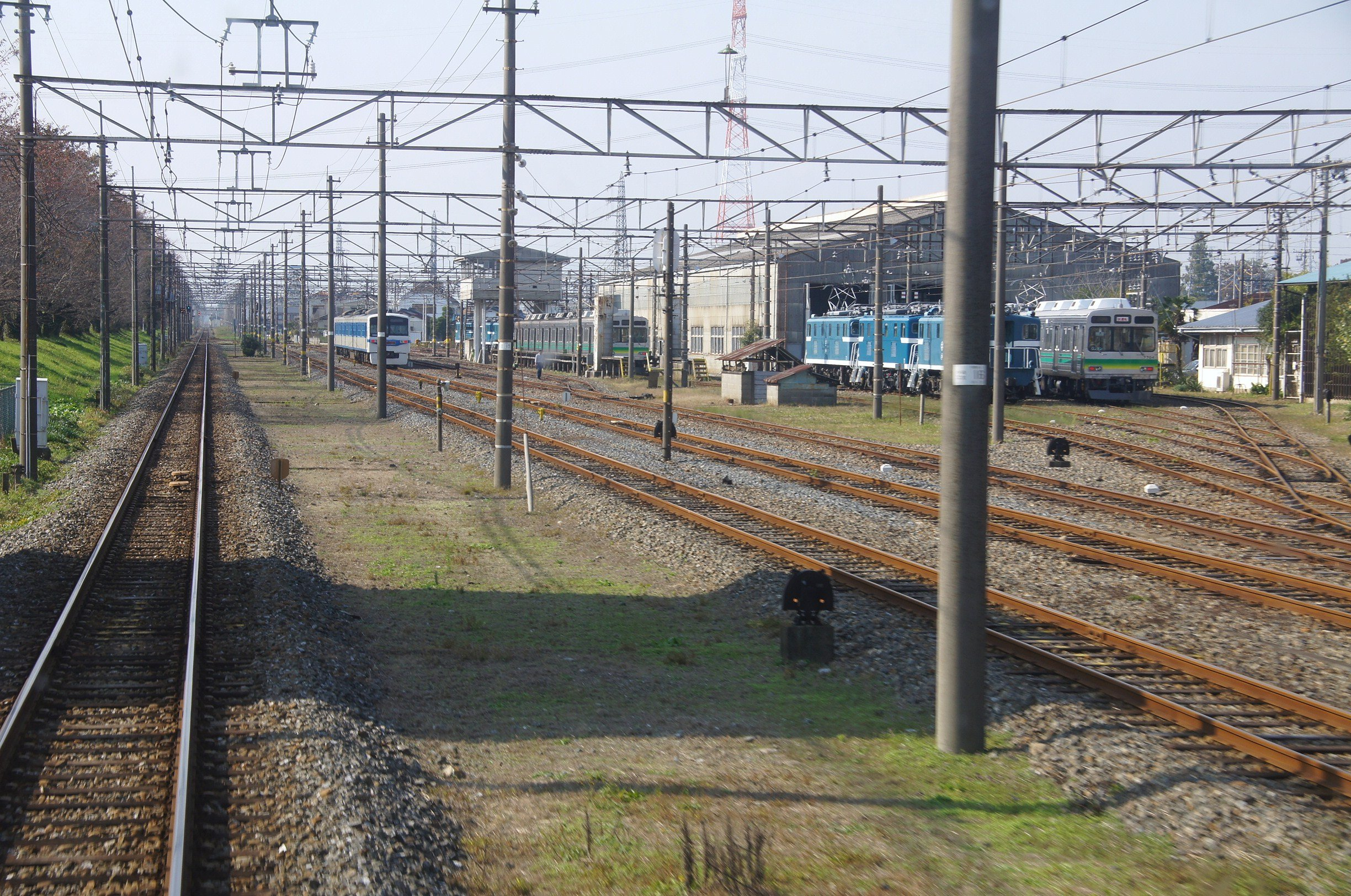
Hirosegawara Depot viewed from a passing train, November 2011

The station is located in a quiet, residential neighborhood.

- Hirosegawara Depot
- Kumagaya Yachō-no-Mori Park
- Saitama Prefecture Kumagaya High School of Commerce
- National Route 140
- Arakawa River

== See also ==
- List of railway stations in Japan
