= Kumagaya =

Kumagaya 熊谷市
- Special city
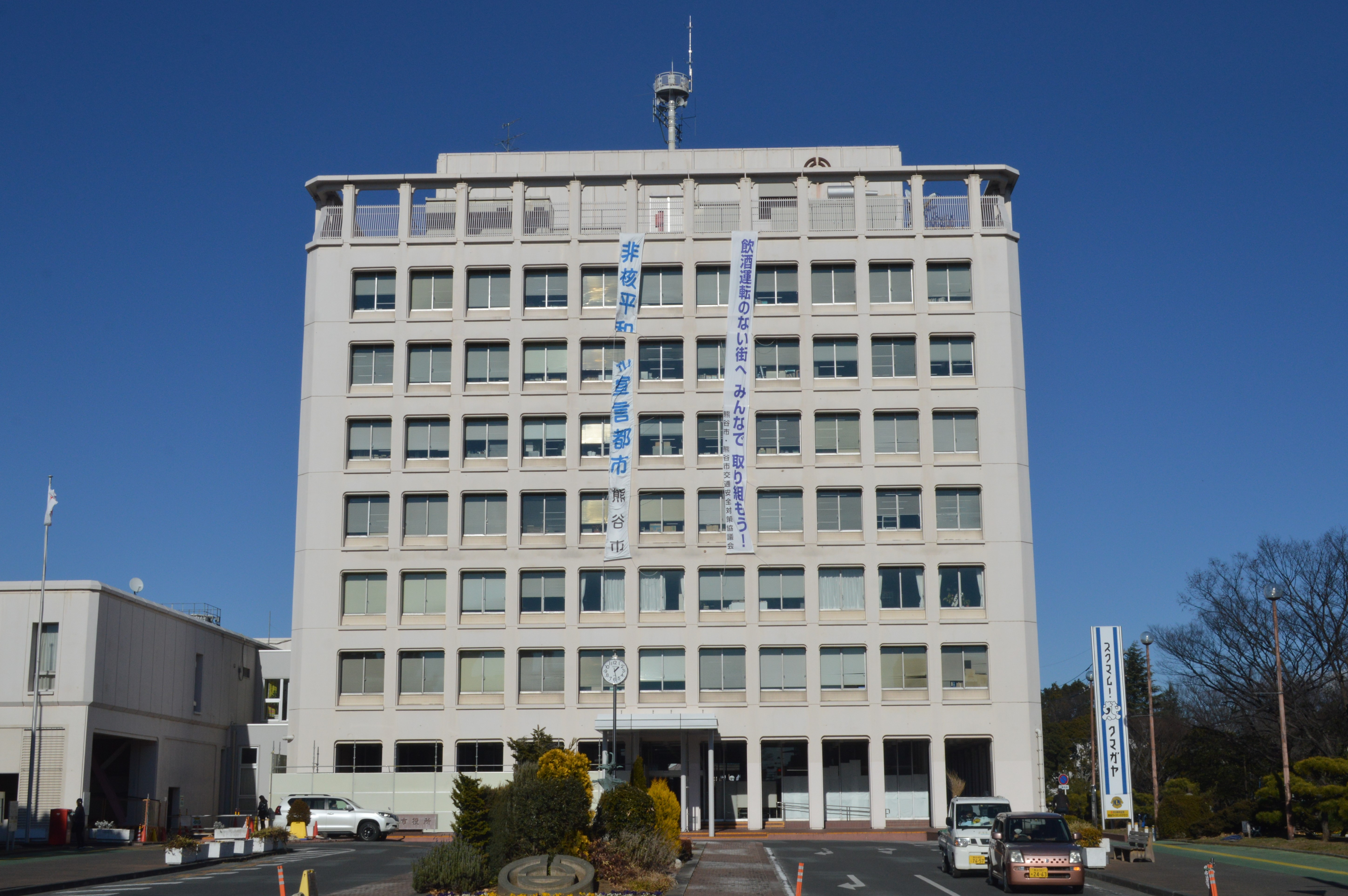
- Kumagaya City office

- Flag Seal

- Location of Kumagaya in Saitama Prefecture

- Location within Japan
- Coordinates: 36°8′50.6″N 139°23′19.1″E
- Country: Japan
- Region: Kantō
- Prefecture: Saitama
- First official recorded: late 6th century AD (official)
- Town settled: April 1, 1889
- City settled: April 1, 1933

Government
  - Mayor: Tetsuya Kobayashi (from November 2021) (Ind.)

Area
  - Total: 159.82 km^{2} (61.71 sq mi)

Population (January 2021)
  - Total: 195,277
  - Density: 1,221.9/km^{2} (3,164.6/sq mi)
- Time zone: UTC+9 (Japan Standard Time)
- Phone number: 048-524-111
- Address: 2-47-1 Miyamachi, Kumagaya-shi 360-8601
- Climate: Cfa
- Website: Official website
- Symbols
- Bird: Eurasian skylark
- Fish: Pungitius
- Flower: Sakura
- Tree: Zelkova serrata

Kumagaya (熊谷市, Kumagaya-shi) is a city located in Saitama Prefecture, Japan. As of 1 February 2021, the city had an estimated population of 195,277 in 87,827 households and a population density of 1,200 persons per km^{2}. The total area of the city is 159.82 square kilometres (61.71 sq mi).

== Geography ==
Kumagaya is one of the largest cities in northern Saitama Prefecture. About two-thirds of the city area is located between the Tone River and the Arakawa River alluvial fan, approximately 60 km from central Tokyo and 45 km from the prefectural capital at Saitama City. The highest point in the city is Mikajiri Kannon, which is located on the Kushibiki plateau at an altitude of 83.3 meters. The city is known for its abundant and high quality ground water.

=== Surrounding municipalities ===
Gunma Prefecture

- Chiyoda
- Oizumi
- Ōta

Saitama Prefecture

- Fukaya
- Gyōda
- Higashimatsuyama
- Kōnosu
- Namegawa
- Ranzan
- Yoshimi

=== Climate ===
Kumagaya has a humid subtropical climate (Köppen climate classification: Cfa) characterized by warm summers and cool winters with light to no snowfall. The average annual temperature in Kumagaya is 14.0 °C. The average annual rainfall is 1532 mm with September as the wettest month. The temperatures are highest on average in August, at around 25.8 °C, and lowest in January, at around 2.4 °C.

Kumagaya is known for being one of the hottest areas in summer in Japan. This is caused by very hot winds from Tokyo and the Chichibu basin in the west of the prefecture. In central Tokyo, the summer monsoon enhanced by sea breeze is heated by the urban heat island. Also, from the Chichibu Mountains, the Föhn blows. The two winds converge above the city at about 2 p.m.

On August 16, 2007, the city recorded air temperature of 40.9 °C (105.6 °F), breaking the 74-year record for the highest temperature recorded in Japan. "Very Hot! Kumagaya" (あついぞ！熊谷) is a catchphrase of the city. On July 23, 2018, the national record was broken again with a temperature of 41.1 °C (106.0 °F), surpassing the previous record of 41.0 °C (105.8 °F) recorded in Kōchi Prefecture in August 2013.

There was a large hailstorm on June 29, 1917, at about 5 p.m. The hailstones had a diameter of 29.5 centimetres and weighed 3.4 kilograms.

The Japan Meteorological Agency maintains a local meteorological observatory in Kumagaya.

Climate data for Kumagaya, Saitama (1991−2020 normals, extremes 1896−present)
Month	Jan	Feb	Mar	Apr	May	Jun	Jul	Aug	Sep	Oct	Nov	Dec	Year
Record high °C (°F)	23.0 (73.4)	27.0 (80.6)	27.3 (81.1)	32.7 (90.9)	36.2 (97.2)	39.8 (103.6)	41.1 (106.0)	40.9 (105.6)	39.7 (103.5)	33.8 (92.8)	27.6 (81.7)	26.3 (79.3)	41.1 (106.0)
Mean maximum °C (°F)	15.8 (60.4)	19.2 (66.6)	22.8 (73.0)	28.0 (82.4)	31.8 (89.2)	33.9 (93.0)	37.3 (99.1)	37.7 (99.9)	34.9 (94.8)	29.2 (84.6)	23.3 (73.9)	18.4 (65.1)	38.4 (101.1)
Mean daily maximum °C (°F)	9.8 (49.6)	10.8 (51.4)	14.3 (57.7)	19.9 (67.8)	24.6 (76.3)	27.1 (80.8)	30.9 (87.6)	32.3 (90.1)	27.9 (82.2)	22.1 (71.8)	16.8 (62.2)	12.0 (53.6)	20.7 (69.3)
Daily mean °C (°F)	4.3 (39.7)	5.1 (41.2)	8.6 (47.5)	13.9 (57.0)	18.8 (65.8)	22.3 (72.1)	26.0 (78.8)	27.1 (80.8)	23.3 (73.9)	17.6 (63.7)	11.7 (53.1)	6.5 (43.7)	15.4 (59.8)
Mean daily minimum °C (°F)	−0.4 (31.3)	0.3 (32.5)	3.6 (38.5)	8.6 (47.5)	13.9 (57.0)	18.3 (64.9)	22.3 (72.1)	23.3 (73.9)	19.7 (67.5)	13.7 (56.7)	7.2 (45.0)	1.8 (35.2)	11.0 (51.8)
Mean minimum °C (°F)	−4.3 (24.3)	−3.7 (25.3)	−1.6 (29.1)	2.2 (36.0)	8.2 (46.8)	13.7 (56.7)	18.5 (65.3)	19.5 (67.1)	13.9 (57.0)	7.6 (45.7)	1.4 (34.5)	−2.6 (27.3)	−4.6 (23.7)
Record low °C (°F)	−10.5 (13.1)	−11.6 (11.1)	−8.7 (16.3)	−4.5 (23.9)	0.3 (32.5)	7.8 (46.0)	11.8 (53.2)	13.0 (55.4)	8.4 (47.1)	0.5 (32.9)	−4.0 (24.8)	−9.8 (14.4)	−11.6 (11.1)
Average precipitation mm (inches)	36.5 (1.44)	32.3 (1.27)	69.0 (2.72)	90.7 (3.57)	115.1 (4.53)	149.5 (5.89)	169.8 (6.69)	183.3 (7.22)	198.2 (7.80)	177.1 (6.97)	53.5 (2.11)	30.9 (1.22)	1,305.9 (51.43)
Average snowfall cm (inches)	7 (2.8)	7 (2.8)	1 (0.4)	0 (0)	0 (0)	0 (0)	0 (0)	0 (0)	0 (0)	0 (0)	0 (0)	1 (0.4)	16 (6.4)
Average rainy days	3.1	3.8	7.6	8.4	9.6	11.7	12.1	9.9	11.4	9.3	5.4	3.5	95.8
Average snowy days	1.1	1.2	0.6	0	0	0	0	0	0	0	0	0.1	3
Average relative humidity (%)	53	52	55	60	64	73	76	74	75	71	65	58	65
Mean monthly sunshine hours	217.0	199.8	203.2	197.1	192.0	133.9	146.0	169.3	131.6	144.1	171.6	200.9	2,106.5
Source: Japan Meteorological Agency (Avreages: 1981-2010, Extremes: 1896-present)

== Demographics ==
Per Japanese census data, the population of Kumagaya peaked around the year 2000 and has declined since.

Historical population
Year	Pop.	±%
1950	126,910	—
1960	134,508	+6.0%
1970	156,955	+16.7%
1980	178,610	+13.8%
1990	200,246	+12.1%
2000	206,446	+3.1%
2010	203,180	−1.6%
2020	194,415	−4.3%

== History ==
Kumagaya was part of ancient Musashi Province and was controlled by various samurai clans from the Heian period. One of these clans, the Kumagaya clan, rose to prominence during the Kamakura period. During the Edo Period, the area was divided between the holdings of Oshi Domain and tenryō territory under direct control of the Tokugawa shogunate. Kumagai-shuku developed as a post town on the Nakasendō highway during this period. After the Meiji restoration, the town of Kumagaya was established with the creation of the modern municipalities system on April 1, 1889.

- 1923: The village of Koizka (from Osato District) was annexed.
- 1927: The village of Narita (from Kita-Saitama District) was annexed.
- 1932: The village of Oohata (from Osato District) was annexed.
- 1933: Kumagaya was elevated to city status.
- 1941: The village of Sayada (from Osato District) was annexed.
- 1945: Bombing of Kumagaya in World War II
- 1954: The villages of Chujo, Beppu, Nara and Mishiri (all from Osato District) were annexed.
- 1955: The villages of Yoshioka, Ooi and Hoshimiya (all from Osato District) were annexed.
- 1967: 22nd National Sports Festival was held.
- 1973: New City Hall was opened.
- 1986: Central Park was opened.
- 1988: Saitama Exhibition was held.
- 1988: Sports Park was opened.
- 1994: Beppu-marsh Park was opened.
- 2004: 59th National Sports Festival was held.
- 2005: The city of Kumagaya annexed the towns of Ōsato and Menuma (both from Ōsato District)
- 2007: The town of Kōnan (from Ōsato District) was annexed.

== Government ==
Kumagaya has a mayor-council form of government with a directly elected mayor and a unicameral city council of 30 members. Kumagaya contributes three members to the Saitama Prefectural Assembly. In terms of national politics, the city is divided between the Saitama 11th district and Saitama 12th district of the lower house of the Diet of Japan.

=== Administration ===
- The city has one city hall and three branch offices.
  - Kumagaya City Hall (熊谷市役所)
  - Menuma Branch Office (妻沼行政センター)
  - Ōsato Branch Office (大里行政センター)
  - Kōnan Branch Office (江南行政センター)
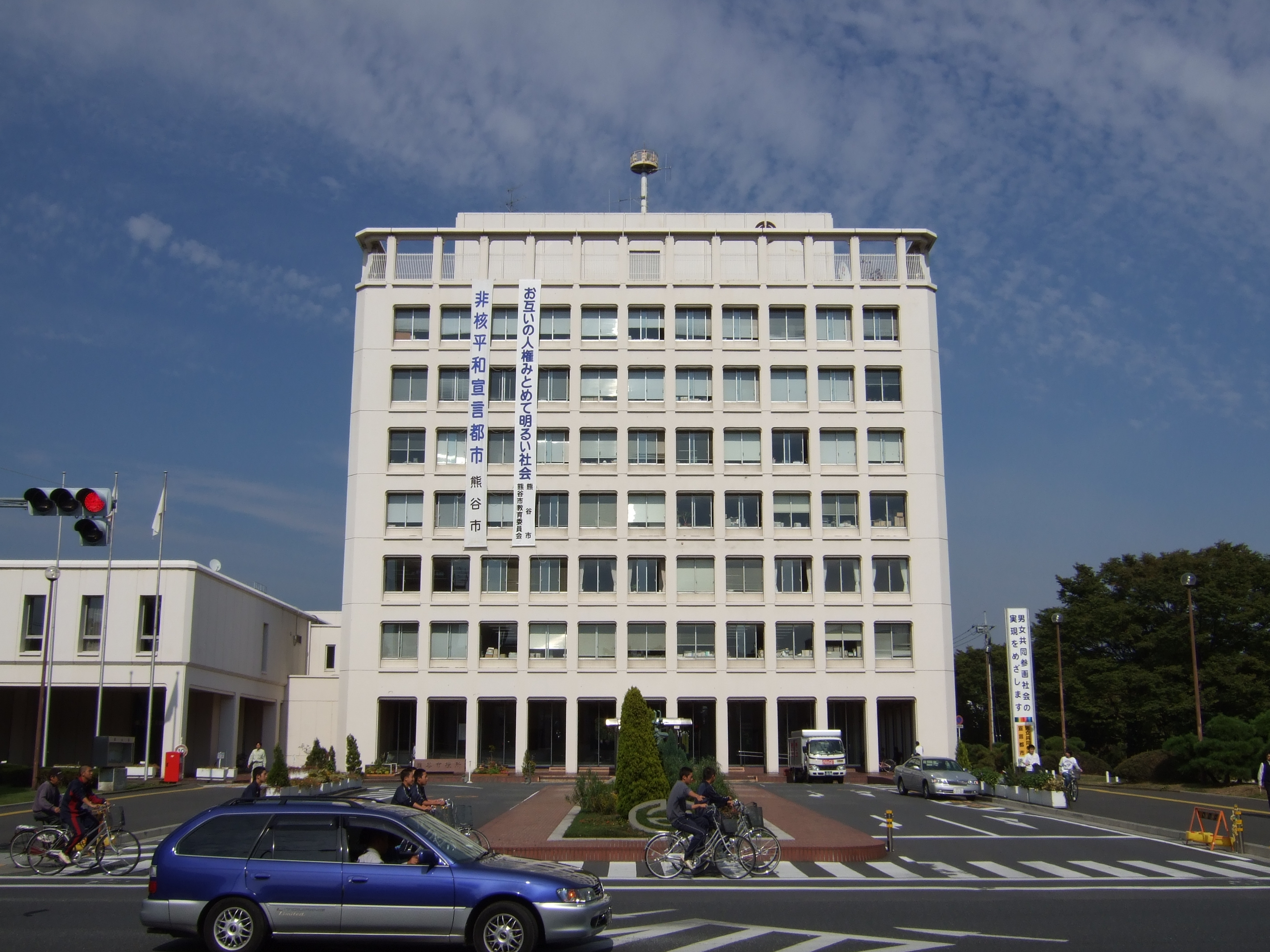
Kumagaya City Hall

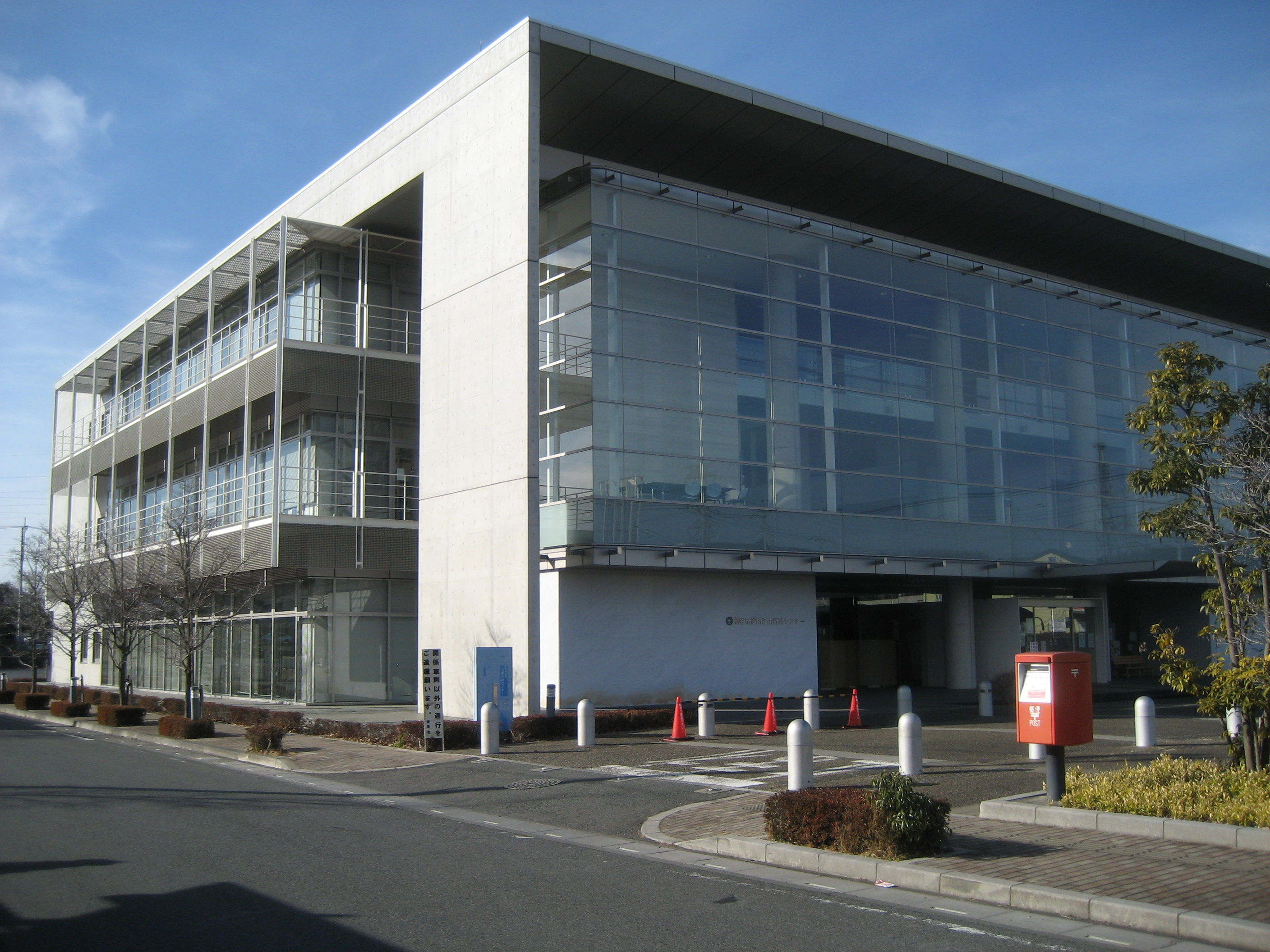
Kumagaya City Hall - Konan branch

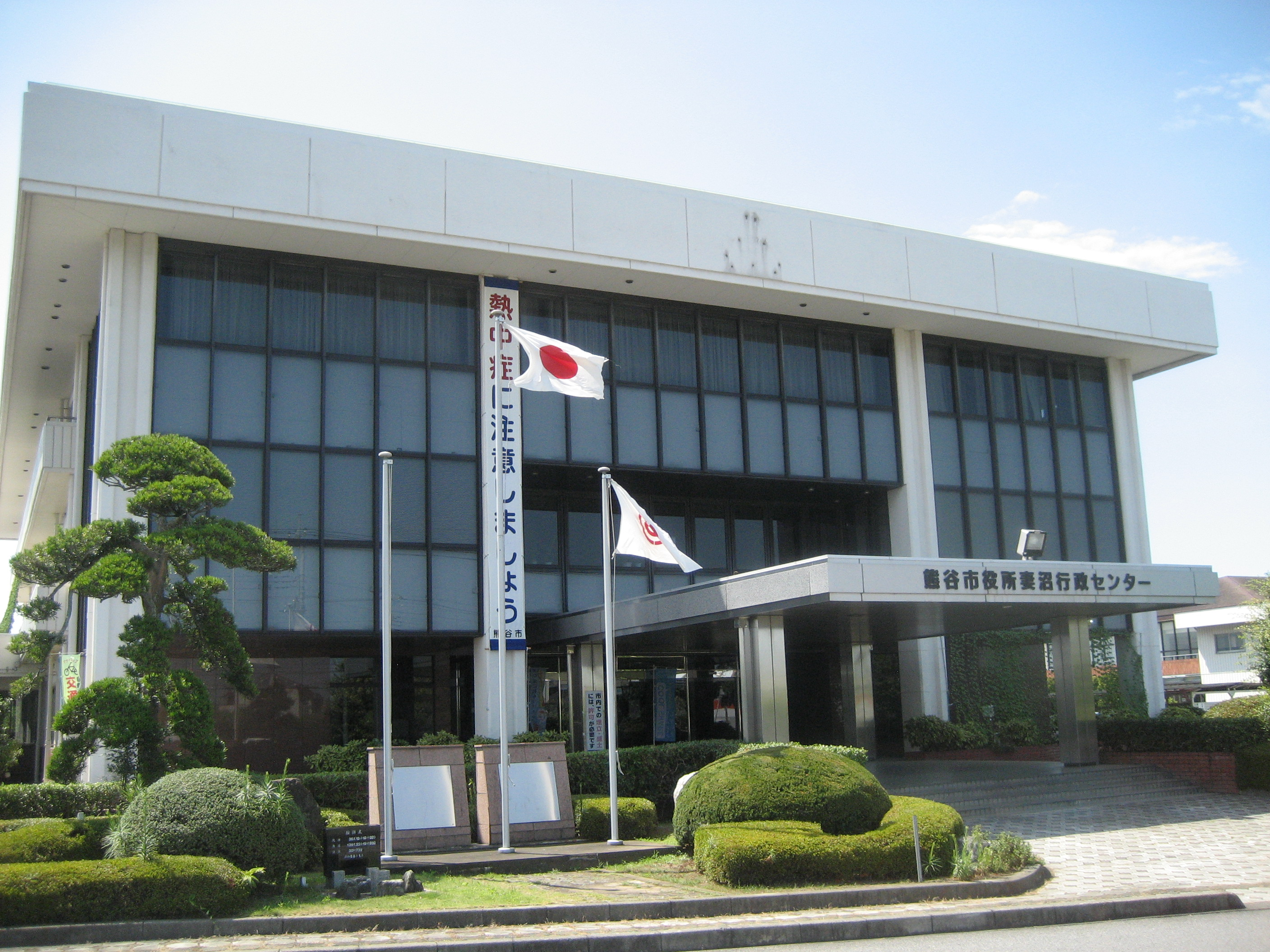
Kumagaya City Hall - Menuma branch

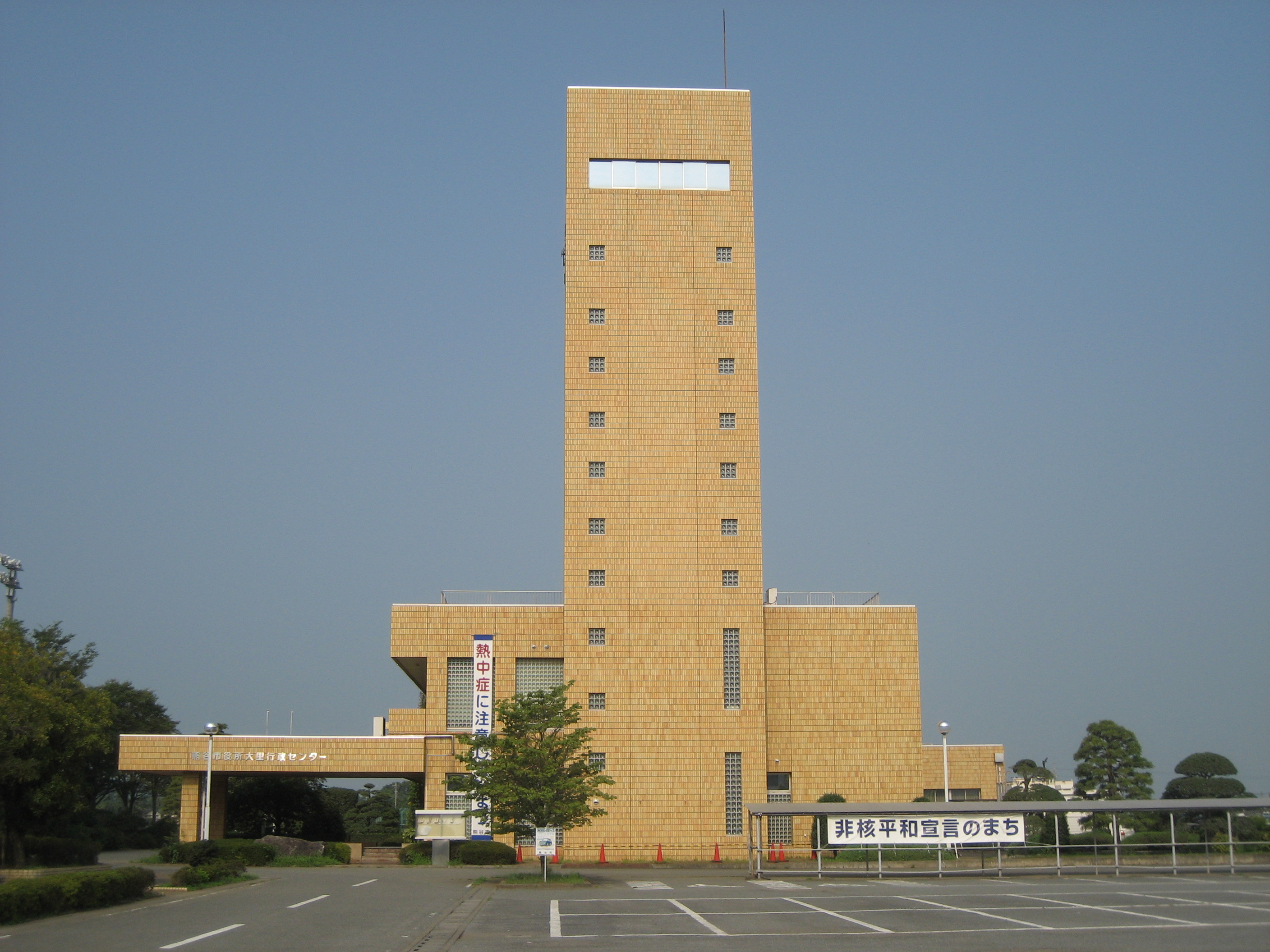
Kumagaya City Hall - Osato branch

=== Mayors ===
- Ryosaku Arai (新井良作): April 1933 to May 1939—1st, 2nd
- Moya Saitou (齋籐茂八): June 1936 to April 1942—3rd
- Takeo Yajima (矢島武男): April 1942 to November 1945—4th
- Tadashi Negishi (根岸忠): January 1946 to March 1947—5th
- Souichi Kamode (鴨田宗一): April 1947 to April 1958—6th to 8th
- Seiichi Kurihara (栗原正一): May 1958 to May 1962—9th
- Uminosuke Kuroda (黒田海之助): May 1962 to May 1982—10th to 14th
- Toshio Masuda (増田敏男): May 1982 to June 1986—15th, 16th
- Kazuo Kobayashi (小林一夫): August 1986 to August 2002—17th to 20th
- Kiyoshi Tomioka (富岡清): August 3, 2003 to September 30, 2005—21st
- Fumio Yoshihara (吉原文雄): October 1, 2005 to November 5, 2005—Interim mayor
- Kiyoshi Tomioka (富岡清): November 6, 2005 to November 5, 2021
- Tetsuya Kobayashi (小林哲也): November 6, 2021 to present

== Economy ==
Kumagaya is a major industrial and commercial center within northern Saitama. Eight national highways and three railway lines serve the city. While many people commute towards south Tokyo, its daytime population is larger than the night population thanks to commuters from surrounding towns.

== Education ==
- Kumagaya has one private university. There are 30 public elementary schools and 17 public middle schools operated by the city government, and seven public high schools operated by the Saitama Prefectural Board of Education. In addition, there are two public and six private vocational training schools. The prefecture also operates two special education schools for the handicapped.

=== Universities ===
- Rissho University—Kumagaya campus

=== Senior high schools ===
- Kumagaya Boys' Senior High School (埼玉県立熊谷高等学校)
- Nishi-Kumagaya Senior High School (埼玉県立熊谷西高等学校)
- Kumagaya Girls' Senior High School (埼玉県立熊谷女子高等学校)
- Menuma Senior High School (埼玉県立妻沼高等学校)
- Kumagaya Industrial Senior High School (埼玉県立熊谷工業高等学校)
- Kumagaya Agricultural Senior High School (埼玉県立熊谷農業高等学校)
- Kumagaya Business Senior High School (埼玉県立熊谷商業高等学校)

=== Middle schools ===
- Arakawa Middle School (熊谷市立荒川中学校)
- Ōaso Middle School (熊谷市立大麻生中学校)
- Ōsato Middle School (熊谷市立大里中学校)
- Ōhata Middle School (熊谷市立大幡中学校)
- Ōhara Middle School (熊谷市立大原中学校)
- Higashi-Kumagaya Junior High School (熊谷市立熊谷東中学校)
- Kounan Middle School (熊谷市立江南中学校)
- Kojima Middle School (熊谷市立小島中学校)
- Tamai Middle School (熊谷市立玉井中学校)
- Chūjō Middle School (熊谷市立中条中学校)
- Nara Middle School (熊谷市立奈良中学校)
- Fujimi Middle School (熊谷市立富士見中学校)
- Beppu Middle School (熊谷市立別府中学校)
- Mishiri Middle School (熊谷市立三尻中学校)
- Nishi-Menuma Middle School (熊谷市立妻沼西中学校)
- Higashi-Menuma Middle School (熊谷市立妻沼東中学校)
- Yoshioka Middle School (熊谷市立吉岡中学校)

=== Elementary schools ===
- Ishiwara Elementary School(熊谷市立石原小学校)
- Ōaso Elementary School (熊谷市立大麻生小学校)
- Ōta Elementary School (熊谷市立太田小学校)
- Ōhata Elementary School (熊谷市立大幡小学校)
- Onuma Elementary School (熊谷市立男沼小学校)
- Ichida Elementary School (熊谷市立市田小学校)
- Kagohara Elementary School (熊谷市立籠原小学校)
- Kuge Elementary School (熊谷市立久下小学校)
- Nishi-Kumagaya Elementary School (熊谷市立熊谷西小学校)
- Higashi-Kumagaya Elementary School (熊谷市立熊谷東小学校)
- Minami-Kumagaya Elementary School (熊谷市立熊谷南小学校)
- Kita-Kōnan Elementary School (熊谷市立江南北小学校)
- Minami-Kōnan Elementary School (熊谷市立江南南小学校)
- Kojima Elementary School (熊谷市立小島小学校)
- Sakuragi Elementary School (熊谷市立桜木小学校)
- Sayada Elementary School (熊谷市立佐谷田小学校)
- Tamai Elementary School (熊谷市立玉井小学校)
- Chūjō Elementary School (熊谷市立中条小学校)
- Nara Elementary School (熊谷市立奈良小学校)
- Nagai Elementary School (熊谷市立長井小学校)
- Narita Elementary School (熊谷市立成田小学校)
- Niibori Elementary School (熊谷市立新堀小学校)
- Hata Elementary School (熊谷市立秦小学校)
- Beppu Elementary School (熊谷市立別府小学校)
- Hoshimiya Elementary School (熊谷市立星宮小学校)
- Mishiri Elementary School (熊谷市立三尻小学校)
- Menuma Elementary School (熊谷市立妻沼小学校)
- Minami-Menuma Elementary School (熊谷市立妻沼南小学校)
- Yoshioka Elementary School (熊谷市立吉岡小学校)
- Yoshimi Elementary School (熊谷市立吉見小学校)

== Transportation ==
=== Railway ===
JR East – Joetsu Shinkansen

- Kumagaya

JR East – JR East - Takasaki Line

- Kumagaya - Kagohara

Chichibu Railway - Chichibu Main Line

- Kumagaya - Kami-Kumagaya - Ishiwara - Hirose-Yachō-no-Mori - Ōasō

=== Highway ===
- National Route 17
- National Route 125
- National Route 140
- National Route 407

== Sister cities ==
Kumagaya is twinned with:

- Invercargill, New Zealand

== Local attractions ==
- Kangi-in temple with architecture designated as a National Treasure
- Kenshō-in temple runs a cremated remains delivery service (送骨, sōkotsu) accepting remains from across Japan

== Notable people from Kumagaya ==
- Kensei Hasegawa, Politician
- Masami Kuwashima, racing driver
- Dump Matsumoto, professional wrestler
- Peach Momoko, artist and writer
