= Kenshō-in (Kumagaya) =

Zen Buddhist temple in Kumagaya, Saitama Prefecture, Japan

Mankichizan Kenshō-in
- 万吉山見性院

Religion
- Affiliation: Buddhist
- Deity: Amitābha
- Rite: Sōtō Zen
- Status: functional

Location
- Country: Japan
- Interactive map of Mankichizan Kenshō-in
- Coordinates: 36°7′22″N 139°21′45″E

Architecture
- Founder: Mineyama Shigeo
- Completed: 1588

Website
- https://www.kenshouin.com/

The Mankichizan Kenshō-in (万吉山見性院) is a Sōtō school Buddhist temple in Kumagaya, Saitama Prefecture, Japan. It was founded by Mineyama Shigeo (峯山繁雄), the 7th abbot of Monju-ji, in 1588.

The main hall was completely destroyed by incendiary bombs on August 15, 1945, in the bombing of Kumagaya. The current main and guest halls were built after the war by then head priest Hashimoto Toshihide (橋本俊英). The current head priest as of 2026, Hashimoto Eiju (橋本英樹), has done changes such as changing the main gate to an onigawara style roof, and modernizing buildings by adding features such as air-conditioning and stained glass. A 6.5 meter Kannon statue was revealed on April 26, 2024, the 17th death anniversary of the previous head priest. A second assembly hall, set to be completed by 2030, is being built at Kenshō-in, and is supposed to be a multi-purpose space that contains a restaurant, rental offices etc.

Around 2010 the pricing of posthumous names and memorial services was also clearly defined by the temple, which is traditionally avoided as it is seen as commercializing religion. In June 2012 aiming to make Kenshō-in "a temple for everyone", where people can belong regardless of religion or nationality, the head priest Hashimoto Eiju abolished fees related to cemetery use, alongside the danka system at the temple, with former parishioners becoming lay followers (信徒, shinto), as he saw the old system as unsustainable, and a part of an hierarchy exploiting the parishioners. The temple also established a "cremated remains delivery service" (送骨, sōkotsu) where cremated remains are sent by post and interned communally at the temple was also established. Cremated remains delivery is popular as it helps prevent problems such as abandoned graves, becoming especially popular during the coronavirus pandemic, and has been adopted by other temples, although some temples have met resistance from religious and civil authorities. These reforms got a lot of media attention, and the temple experienced a doubling in the amount of followers and a tripling in income.

Head priest Hashimoto has organized the Zen-yūkai (善友会) group, which holds temple management study groups among other activities, and he shares information about his reforms on YouTube. He sees the financial future of Buddhist temples in Japan as dire, and imagines that in the future temples could maintain themselves by having various services, such as medical and law consultations, as part of their facilities.

== See also ==
- List of Buddhist temples in Japan
- Sōtō Zen
