= Adachi (surname) =

Adachi (written 安達, 足立, 足達 or あだち in hiragana) is a Japanese surname. Notable people with the surname include:

- Adachi (あだち), a member of the manga artist duo Adachitoka
- Akihiko Adachi (安達 明彦; born 1965), Japanese mixed martial artist
- Barbara Adachi, American businesswoman
- Chihaya Adachi (born 1963), Japanese physicist
- Adachi Ginkō (安達 吟光; 1853–1908), Japanese ukiyo-e artist
- Goro Adachi (安達 五郎; 1913–1999), Japanese ski jumper
- Hatazō Adachi (安達 二十三; 1884–1947), Japanese general
- Hirohide Adachi (足立 丈英; born 1999), Japanese footballer
- Jeff Adachi (1959–2019), American lawyer
- Adachi Kagemori (安達 景盛; died 1248), Japanese warrior, son of Morinaga
- Kaoru Adachi (安達 かおる; born 1956), Japanese film director, producer and editor
- Katsuji Adachi (安達 勝治; 1942–2010), better known as Mr. Hito, Japanese professional wrestler
- Kazuya Adachi (足立 和也; born 1990), Japanese slalom canoeist
- Ken Adachi (1929–1989), Canadian writer and literary critic
- Kenyi Adachi (born 1993), Mexican footballer
- Adachi Kenzō (安達 謙蔵; 1864–1948), Japanese politician
- Kiyoshi Adachi (安達 清; 1914–?), Japanese pole vaulter
- Mariko Adachi (足立 真梨子; born 1983), Japanese triathlete
- Masao Adachi (足立 正生; born 1939), Japanese screenwriter and film director
- Miho Adachi (足立 美穂; born 1979), Japanese sprint canoeist
- Mineichirō Adachi (安達 峰一郎; 1870–1934), Japanese judge
- Mitsuhiro Adachi (足立 光宏; born 1940), Japanese baseball player
- Mitsuru Adachi (あだち 充; born 1951), Japanese manga artist
- Adachi Morinaga (安達 盛長; 1135–1200), Japanese warrior
- Osamu Adachi (足立 理; born 1987), Japanese actor and singer
- Rika Adachi (足立 梨花; born 1992), Japanese television personality and actress
- Ryo Adachi (安達 亮; born 1969), Japanese footballer and manager
- Ryoichi Adachi (安達 了一; born 1988), Japanese baseball player
- Seiya Adachi (足立 聖弥; born 1995), Japanese water polo player
- Shinobu Adachi (安達 忍; born 1958), Japanese voice actress
- Shinya Adachi (足立 信也; born 1957), Japanese politician
- Shōtarō Adachi (足立 正太郎; 1901–1995), Japanese photographer
- Takumi Adachi (安達 巧; born 1966), Japanese sport wrestler
- Tomomi Adachi (足立 智美; born 1972), Japanese musician
- Toshiya Adachi (安達 俊也; born 1965), Japanese baseball player
- Toshiyuki Adachi (足立 敏之; 1954–2024), Japanese politician
- Tsunamitsu Adachi (安立 綱光; 1901–1981), Japanese entomologist
- Tsutomu Adachi (あだち 勉; 1947–2004), Japanese manga artist and the older brother of Mitsuru Adachi
- Yasushi Adachi (足立 康史; born 1965), Japanese politician
- Yuji Adachi (足立 祐二; born 1964), Japanese musician and songwriter
- Yumi Adachi (安達 祐実; born 1981), Japanese actress and singer
- Yumi Adachi (synchronised swimmer) (足立 夢実; born 1989), Japanese synchronized swimmer
- Yurie Adachi (足立 友里恵; born 1985), Japanese ice hockey player
- Yusuke Adachi (足達 勇輔; born 1961), Japanese footballer and manager
- Yuto Adachi (安達 祐人; born 1998), Japanese rapper of K-Pop group Pentagon
- Yositaka Adachi (born 1962), Palauan politician

== Fictional characters ==
- Koichi Adachi (足立 宏一), a character in the video game Yakuza: Like a Dragon
- Hana Adachi (足立 花), a character in the manga series Yankee-kun to Megane-chan
- Lady Masako Adachi, a character in the video game Ghost of Tsushima, with motion-capture provided and voiced by Lauren Tom
- Sakura Adachi (安達 桜), a character in the light novel series Adachi to Shimamura
- Tohru Adachi (足立 透), a character in the video game Persona 4
- Adachi Rei (足立 レイ), a voicebank for the singing synthesis software UTAU and the associated character

== See also ==
- Adachi clan, a Japanese samurai clan
