= List of dams in Saitama Prefecture =

The following is a list of dams in Saitama Prefecture, Japan.

== List ==
| Name | Location | Started | Opened | Height | Length | Image | DiJ number |
|---|---|---|---|---|---|---|---|
| Arima Dam | | | | 83.5 m (274 ft) | | | 0640 |
| Futase Dam | | 1961 | 1961 | 95 m (312 ft) | | | 0637 |
| Kakkaku Dam | | 1970 | 2001 | 60.9 m (200 ft) | | | 0641 |
| Maze Dam | | | | 27.5 m (90 ft) | | | 0633 |
| Shimokubo Dam | | 1968 | 1968 | 129 m (423 ft) | | | 0615 |
| Shinsui Dam | | | | 20.5 m (67 ft) | | | 0614 |
| Suzukawa Sabo Dam | | | | | | | |
| Takizawa Dam | | 2008 | 2007 | 132 m (433 ft) | | | 0643 |
| Tamayodo Dam | | 1962 | 1964 | 32 m (105 ft) | | | 0638 |
| Tsuburada Dam | | 1949 | 1954 | 21 m (69 ft) | | | 0635 |
| Urayama Dam | | 1998 | 1999 | 156 m (512 ft) | 372 m (1,220 ft) | | 0642 |
| Yamaguchi Dam | | 1999 | 2002 | 33.5 m (110 ft) | 716 m (2,349 ft) | | |

== See also ==
- Media related to Dams in Saitama prefecture at Wikimedia Commons
