= Adachi =

Adachi may refer to:

== People ==
- Adachi (surname)
- Adachi clan, a family of samurai
- Adachi Ginkō, 19th-century Japanese artist
- Tohru Adachi, a fictional character from Persona 4

== Places ==
- Adachi, Tokyo, a special ward of Tokyo, Japan
- Adachi District, Fukushima, Japan
- Adachi, Fukushima, a town in Adachi District, Fukushima Prefecture

== See also ==
- "Adachi-ga Hara", the title of the first issue in the 1970s Lion Books manga series as well as the fifth episode of the anime adaptation
- The noh play Kurozuka also known in kabuki as "Ōshū Adachigahara" (奥州安達原)
