= Kagemori =

Kagemori may refer to:

- Adachi Kagemori (安達 景盛) (died 1248), Japanese warrior monk
- Kagemori Station (影森駅, Kagemori-eki), train station in Chichibu, Saitama Prefecture, Japan
