= Miyatake =

Miyatake (written: 宮武) is a Japanese surname. Notable people with the surname include:

- Miyatake Gaikotsu (宮武 外骨, 1867–1955), Japanese writer, journalist and media historian
- Kazutaka Miyatake (宮武 一貴, born 1949), Japanese mechanical designer
- Tōyō Miyatake (宮武 東洋, 1895–1979), Japanese-American photographer
