= Urayamaguchi Station =

Railway station in Chichibu, Saitama Prefecture, Japan

CR33 Urayamaguchi Station 浦山口駅
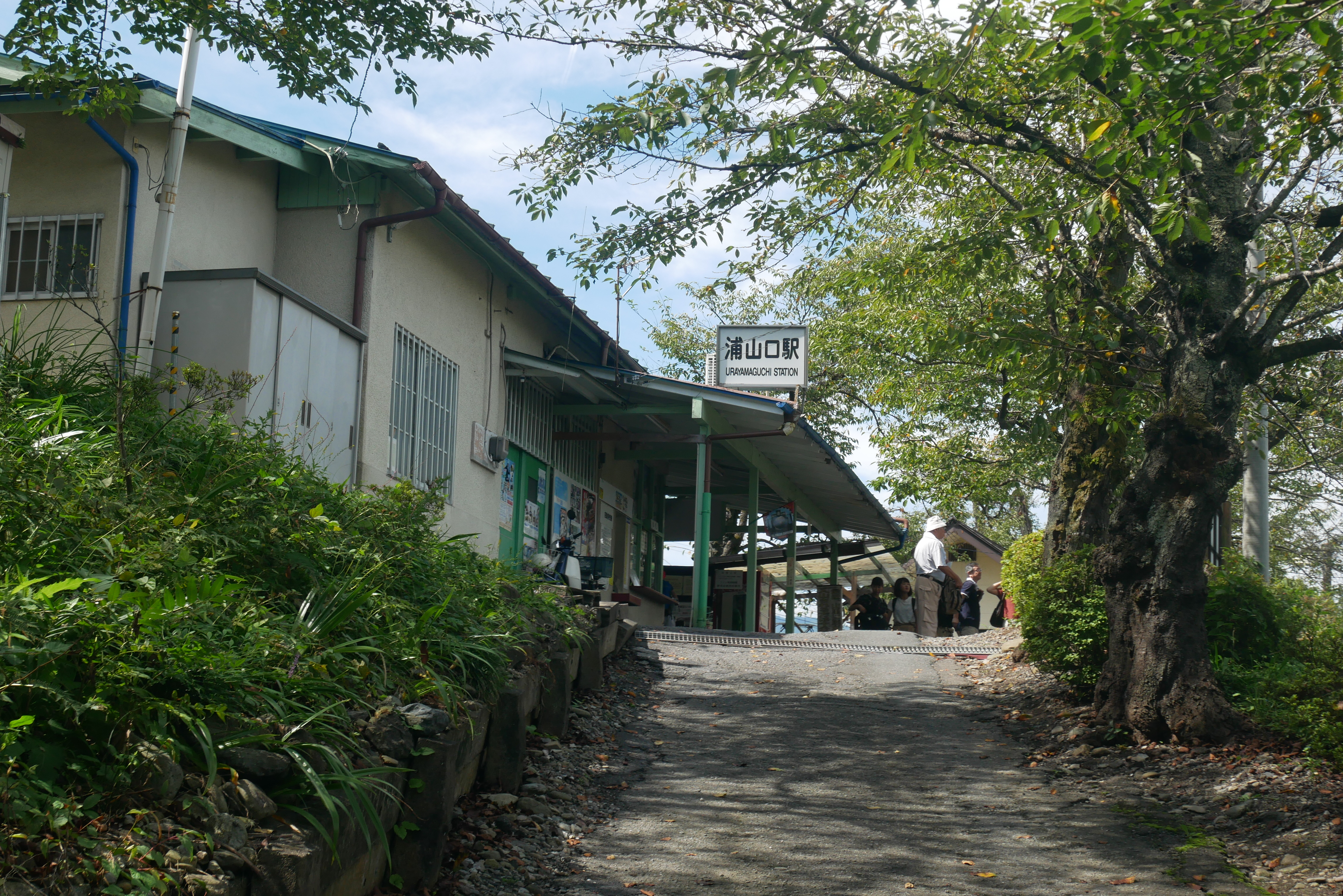
- Urayamaguchi Station in September 2018

General information
- Location: 3895 Arakawakuna, Chichibu-shi, Saitama-ken 369-1801; Japan
- Coordinates: 35°57′50.52″N 139°3′30.68″E
- Operator: Chichibu Railway
- Line: ■ Chichibu Main Line
- Distance: 63.8 km from Hanyū
- Platforms: 1 side platform

Other information
- Status: Staffed
- Website: Official website

History
- Opened: 15 March 1930

Passengers
- FY2018: 183 daily

Services
| Preceding station | Chichibu Railway | Following station |
|---|---|---|
| Bushū-Nakagawa CR34 towards Mitsumineguchi | Chichibu Main Line Local | Kagemori CR32 towards Hanyū |
Location
- Location within Saitama Prefecture Location within Japan

Urayamaguchi Station (浦山口駅, Urayamaguchi-eki)is a passenger railway station located in the city of Chichibu, Saitama, Japan, operated by the private railway operator Chichibu Railway.

== Lines ==
Urayamaguchi Station is served by the Chichibu Main Line from Hanyū to Mitsumineguchi, and is located 63.8 km from Hanyū. It is also served by through services to and from the Seibu Chichibu Line.

== Station layout ==
The station is staffed and consists of a single side platform serving a single bi-directional track.

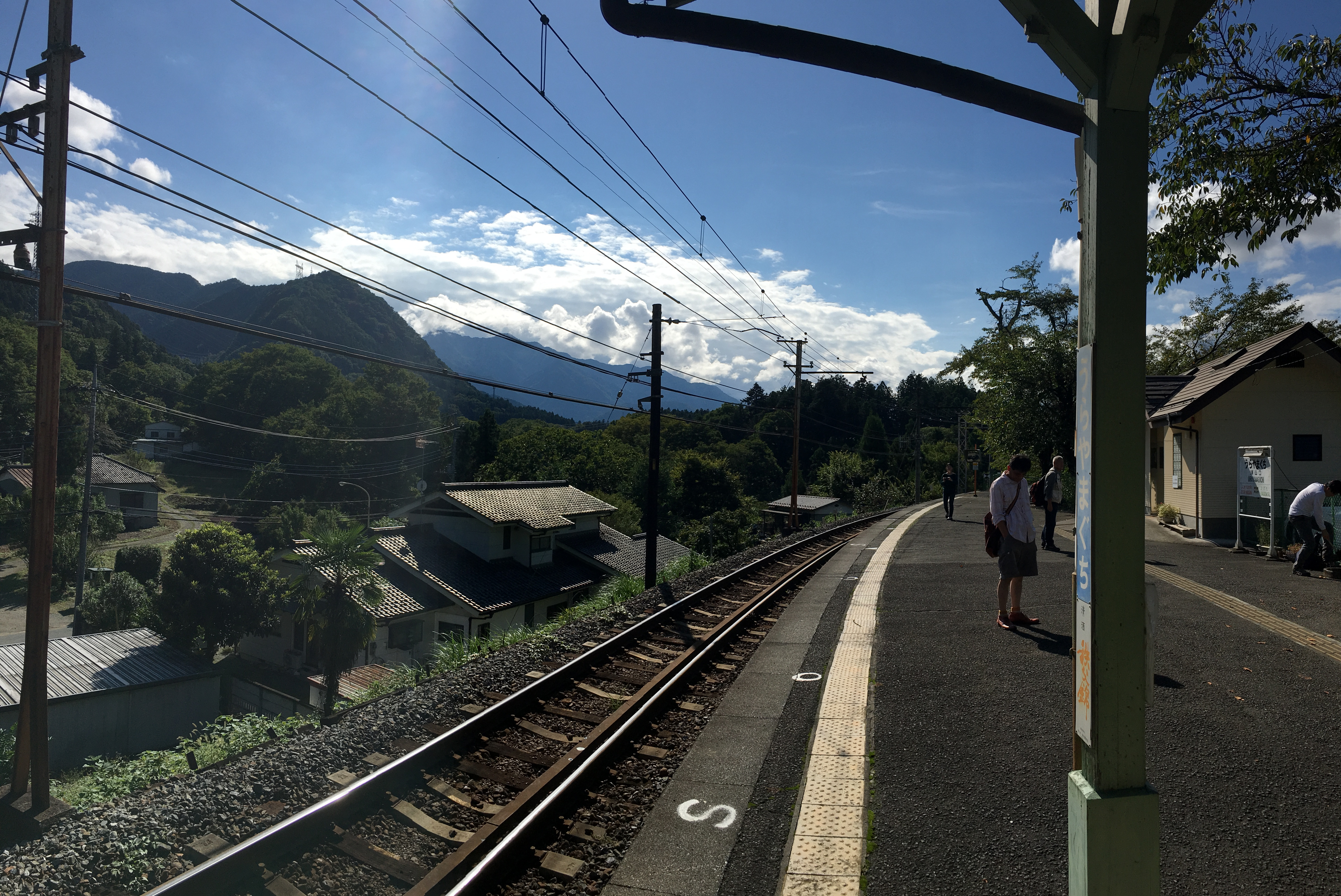
The station platform in September 2018

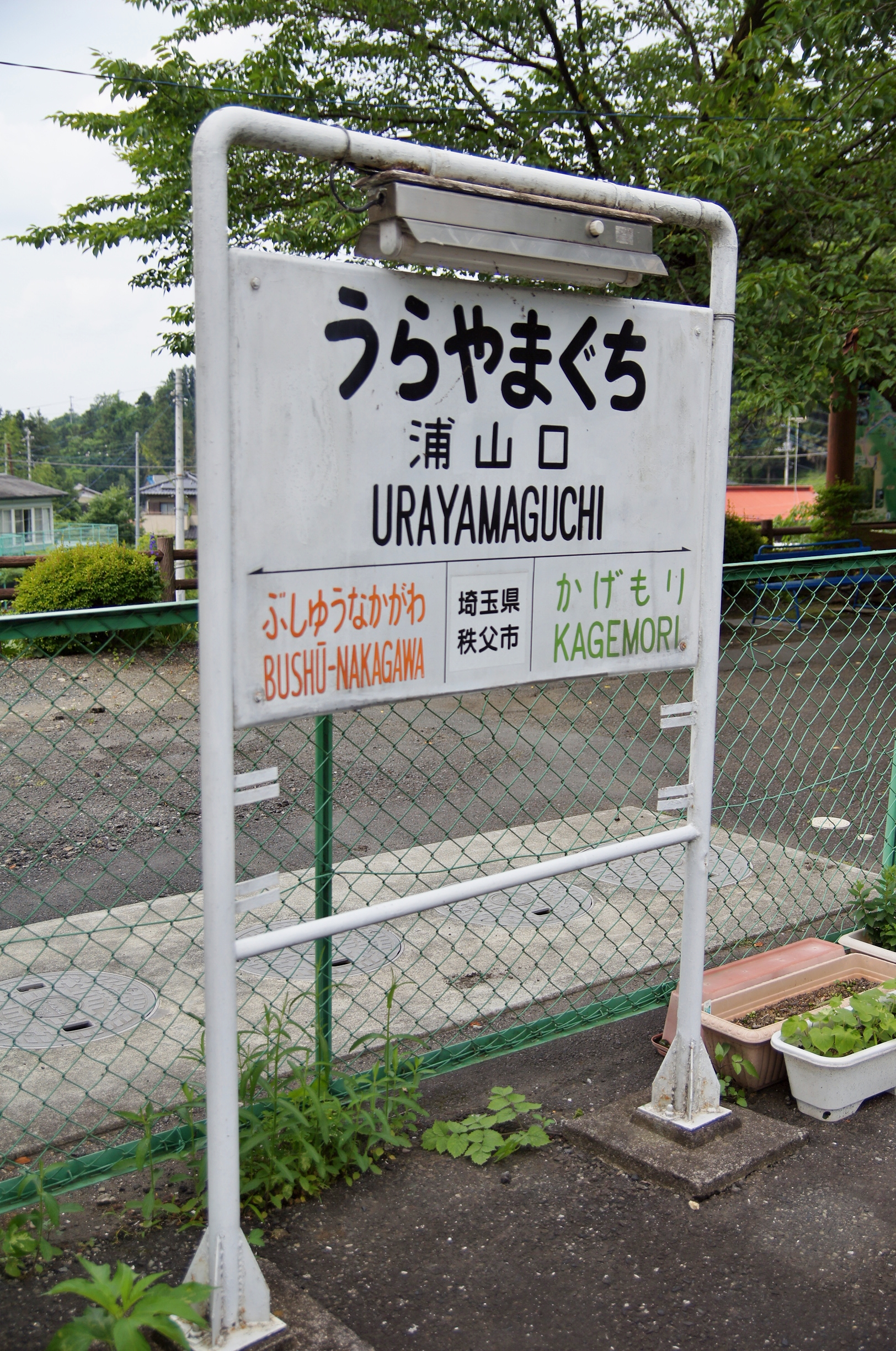
The station sign in June 2012

== History ==
Urayamaguchi Station opened on 15 March 1930.

== Passenger statistics ==
In fiscal 2018, the station was used by an average of 183 passengers daily.

== Surrounding area ==
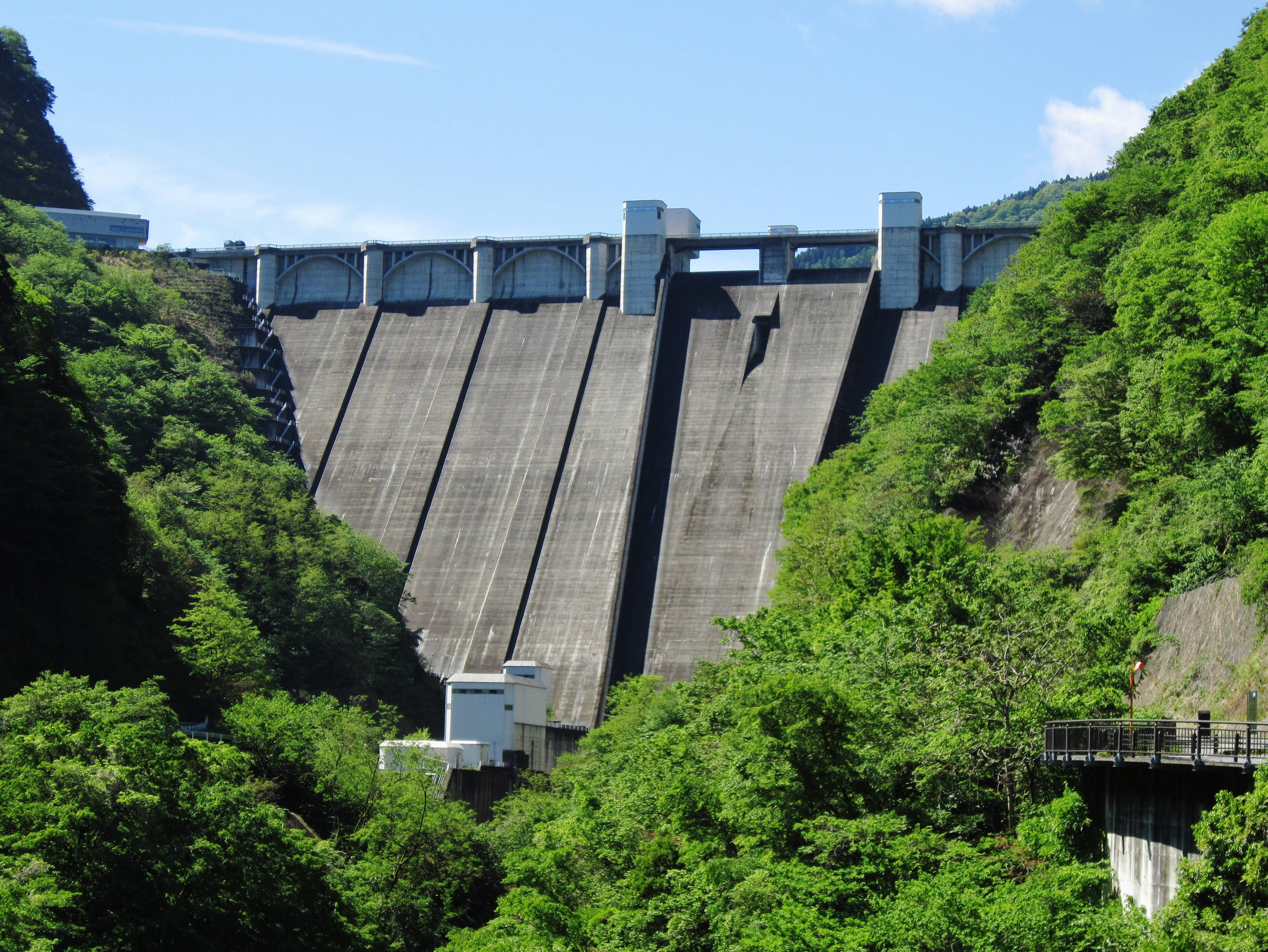
Urayama Dam

- Arakawa River
- National Route 140
- Urayama Dam
- Mount Bukō

== See also ==
- List of railway stations in Japan
