= Shiroku Station =

Railway station in Chichibu, Saitama Prefecture, Japan

CR36 Shiroku Station 白久駅
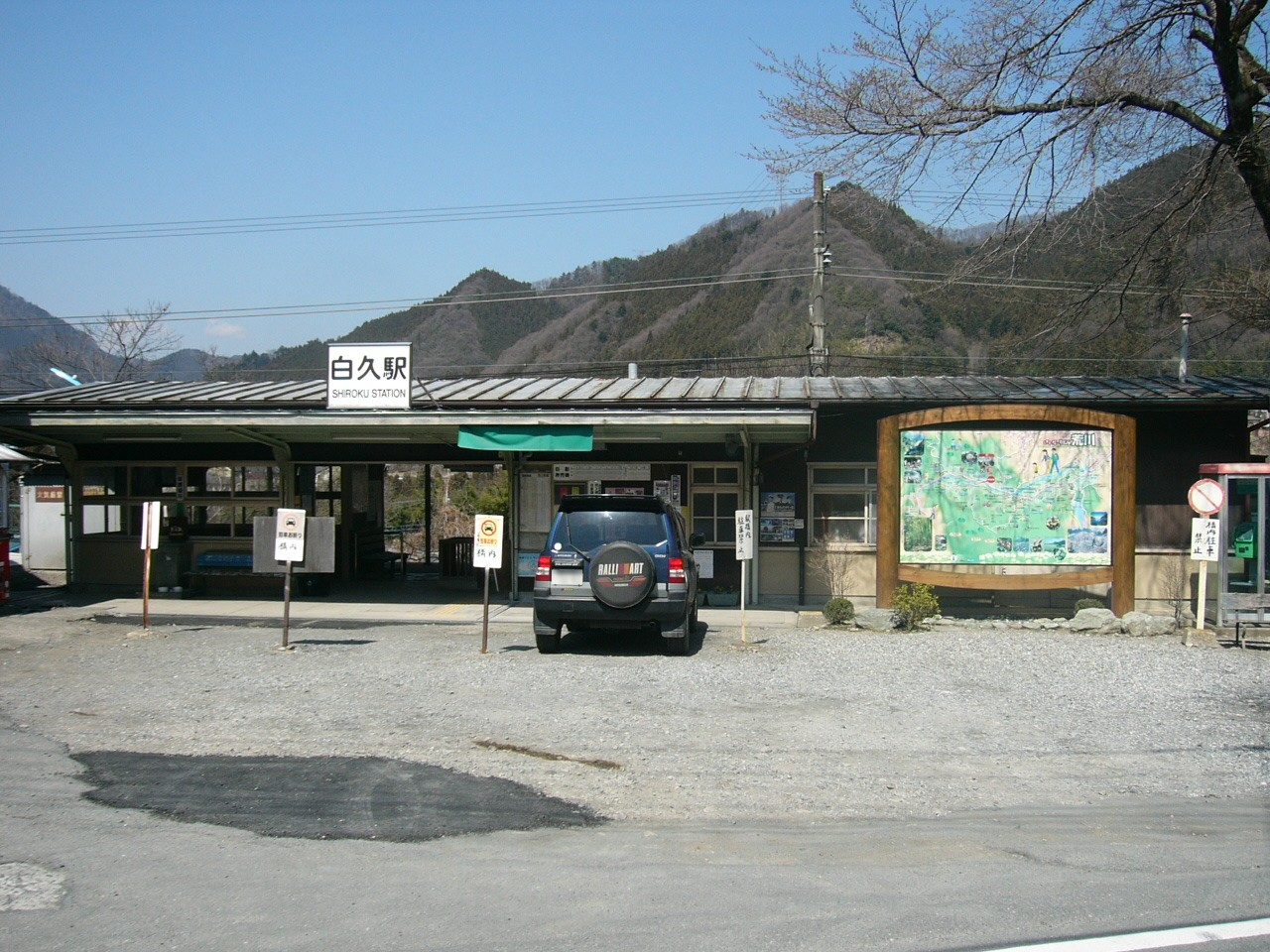
- Shiroku Station, March 2006

General information
- Location: 524-8 Arakawa-shiroku, Chichibu-shi, Saitama-ken 369-1912; Japan
- Coordinates: 35°57′31.88″N 138°59′35.94″E
- Operator: Chichibu Railway
- Line: ■ Chichibu Main Line
- Distance: 70.4 km from Hanyū
- Platforms: 1 side platform

Other information
- Status: Staffed
- Website: Official website

History
- Opened: 15 March 1930

Passengers
- FY2018: 126 daily

Services
Preceding station	Chichibu Railway	Following station
Mitsumineguchi CR37 Terminus	Chichibu Main Line Local	Bushū-Hino CR35 towards Hanyū
Location
- Location within Saitama Prefecture Location within Japan

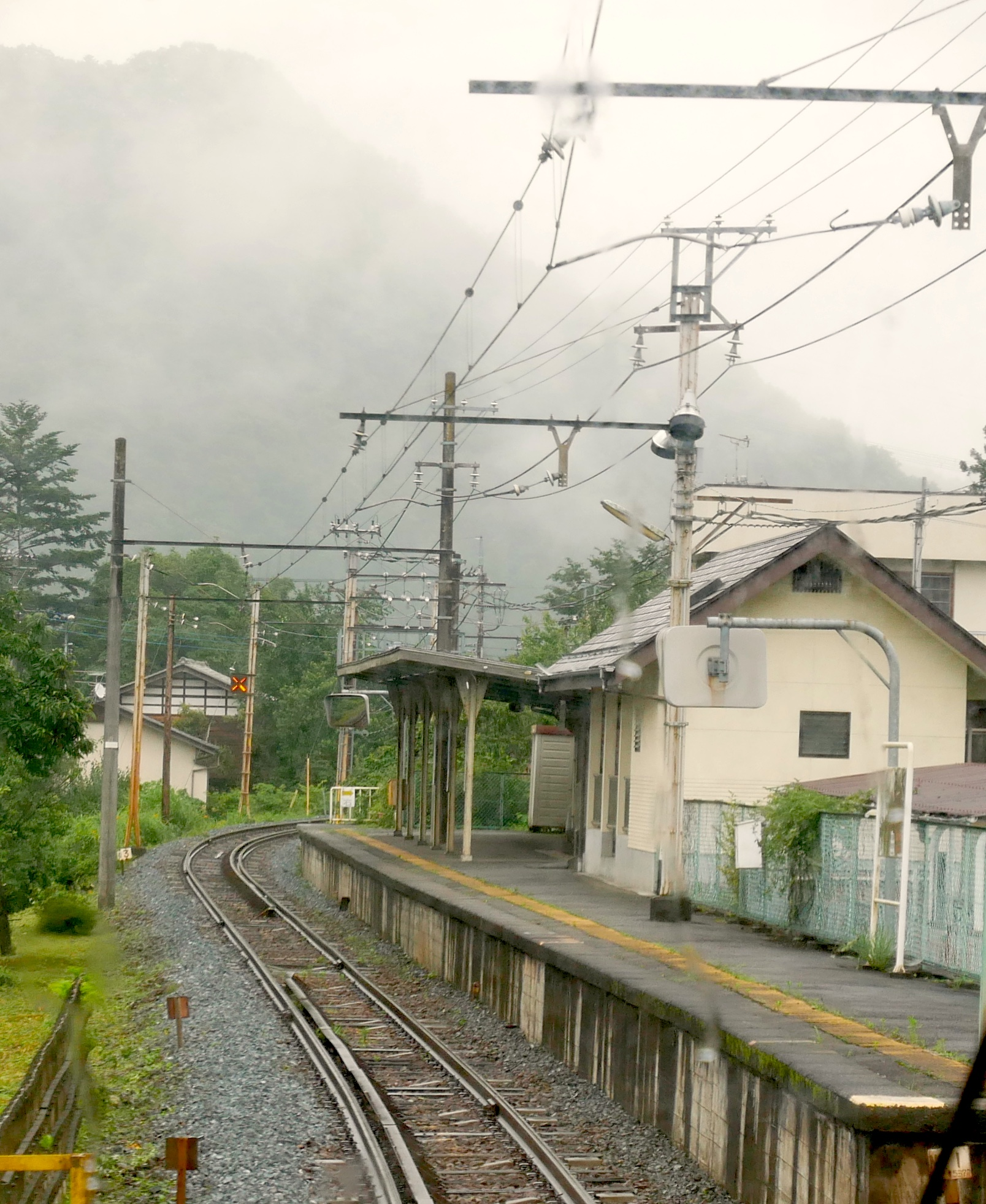
Station platform, 2019

Shiroku Station (白久駅, Shiroku-eki) is a passenger railway station located in the city of Chichibu, Saitama, Japan, operated by the private railway operator Chichibu Railway.

== Lines ==
Shiroku Station is served by the Chichibu Main Line from Hanyū to Mitsumineguchi, and is located 70.4 km from Hanyū. It is also served by through services to and from the Seibu Chichibu Line.

== Station layout ==
The station is staffed and consists of a side platform serving a single bidirectional track.

== History ==
Shiroku Station opened on 15 March 1930.

== Passenger statistics ==
In fiscal 2018, the station was used by an average of 126 passengers daily.

== Surrounding area ==
- Arakawa River
- National Route 140
- Shiroku Onsen
