= Adachi Yasumori =

Adachi Yasumori (安達 泰盛) was a mid-Kamakura period samurai. A prominent gokenin of the Kamakura shogunate, he was the great-grandson of Adachi Morinaga, serving as a close aide to Minamoto no Yoritomo during his exile. He held the positions of shugo of Kōzuke and Higo, and was the third (eldest) son of Adachi Yoshikage. During the Mongol invasions of Japan, his fleet participated in the raids against the Mongol forces during the Battle of Kōan.

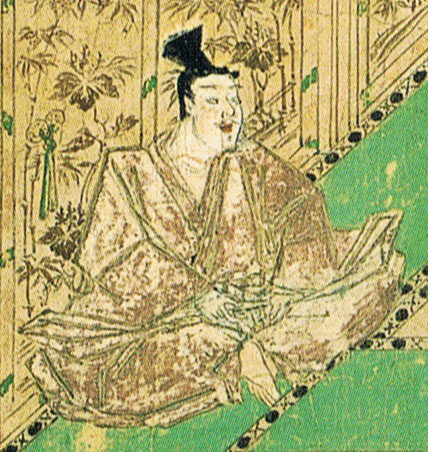
Yasumori in the Mōko Shūrai Ekotoba
