= Bushū-Hino Station =

Railway station in Chichibu, Saitama Prefecture, Japan

CR35 Bushū-Hino Station 武州日野駅
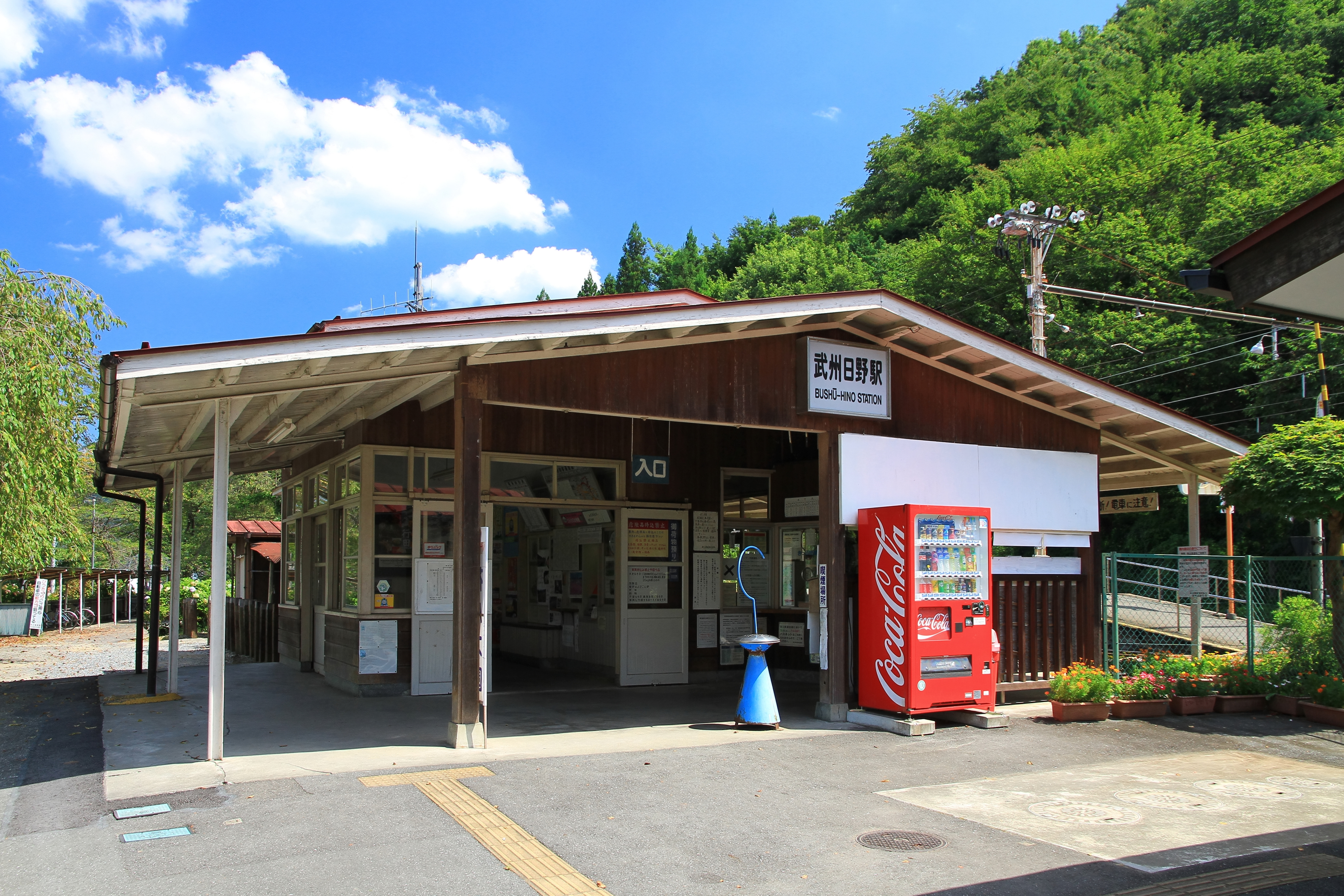
- Bushū-Hino Station, August, 2012

General information
- Location: 822-2 Arakawa-hino, Chichibu-shi, Saitama-ken 369–1803; Japan
- Coordinates: 35°57′14.58″N 139°1′16.95″E
- Operator: Chichibu Railway
- Line: ■ Chichibu Main Line
- Distance: 67.7 km from Hanyū
- Platforms: 1 island platform

Other information
- Status: Staffed
- Website: www.chichibu-railway.co.jp/station/33_hino.html

History
- Opened: 15 March 1930

Passengers
- FY2018: 201 daily

Services
Preceding station	Chichibu Railway	Following station
Shiroku CR36 towards Mitsumineguchi	Chichibu Main Line Local	Bushū-Nakagawa CR34 towards Hanyū
Location
- Location within Saitama Prefecture Location within Japan

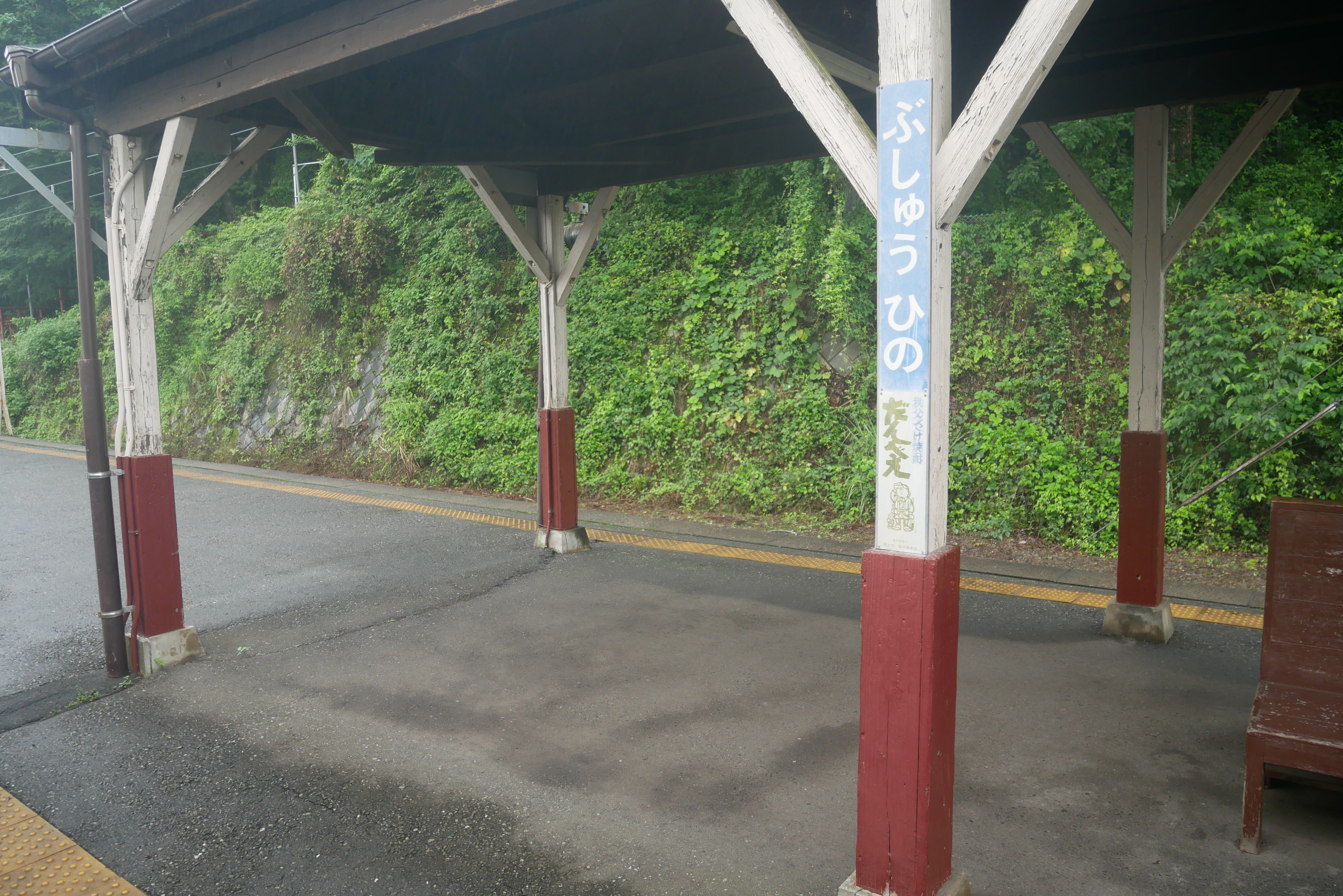
Station platform, 2019

Bushū-Hino Station (武州日野駅, Bushū-Hino-eki) is a passenger railway station located in the city of Chichibu, Saitama, Japan, operated by the private railway operator Chichibu Railway.

== Lines ==
Bushū-Hino Station is served by the Chichibu Main Line from Hanyū to Mitsumineguchi, and is located 67.7 km from Hanyū. It is also served by through services to and from the Seibu Chichibu Line.

== Station layout ==
The station is staffed and consists of an island platform serving two tracks.

=== Platforms ===
1	■ Chichibu Main Line	for Chichibu, Yorii, Kumagaya, and Hanyū, and through services via Seibu Chichibu Line
2	■ Chichibu Main Line	for Mitsumineguchi

== History ==
Bushū-Hino Station opened on 15 March 1930.

== Passenger statistics ==
In fiscal 2018, the station was used by an average of 201 passengers daily.

== Surrounding area ==
- Arakawa River
- National Route 140
- Chichibu Arakawa Junior High School
