= Bushū-Nakagawa Station =

Railway station in Chichibu, Saitama Prefecture, Japan

CR34 Bushū-Nakagawa Station 武州中川駅
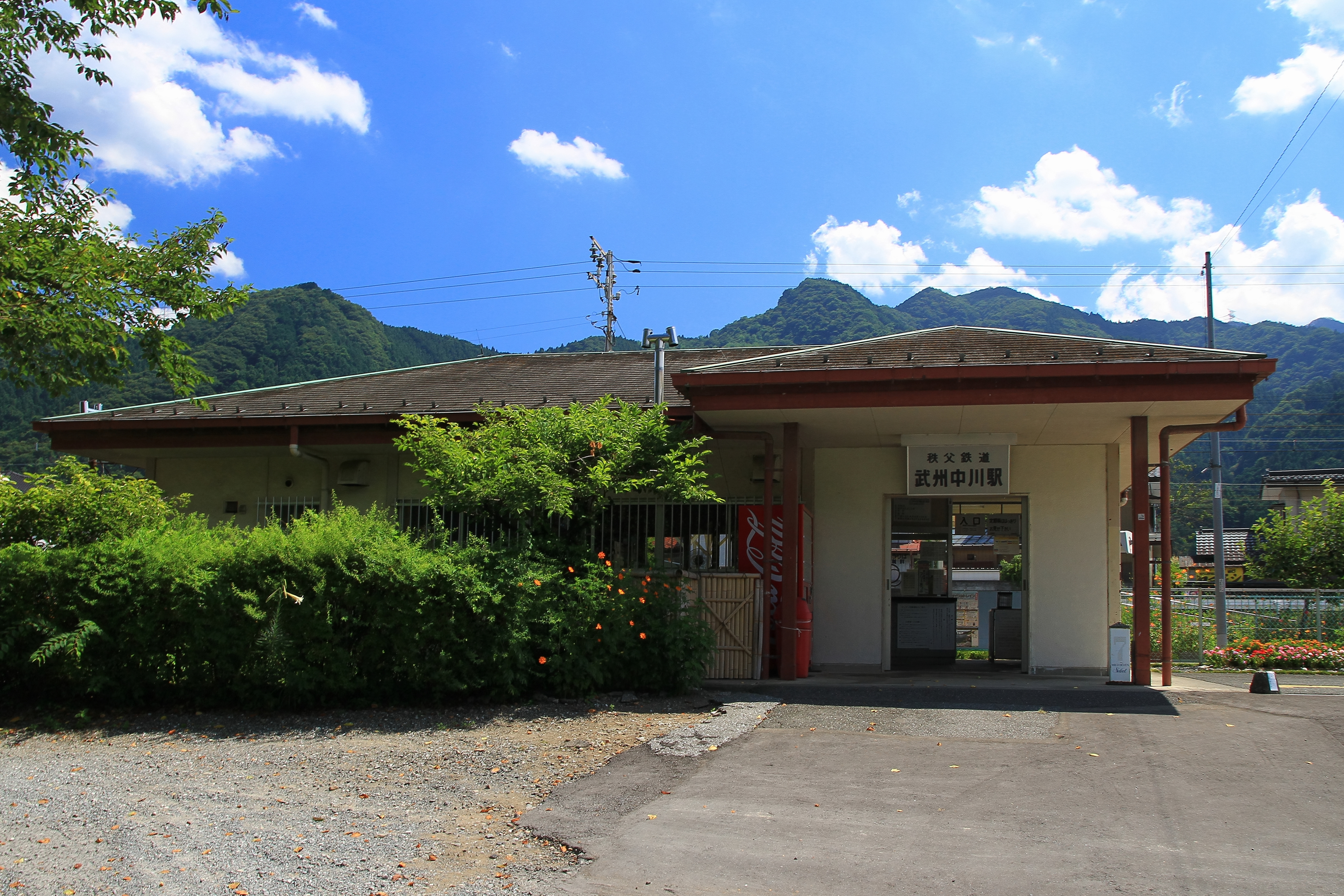
- Bushū-Nakagawa Station, August 2012

General information
- Location: 1451–5 Arakawa-kamitano, Chichibu-shi, Saitama-ken 369–1802; Japan
- Coordinates: 35°57′30.44″N 139°2′6.82″E
- Operator: Chichibu Railway
- Line: ■ Chichibu Main Line
- Distance: 66.2 km from Hanyū
- Platforms: 1 island platform

Other information
- Status: Staffed
- Website: Official website

History
- Opened: 15 March 1930

Passengers
- FY2018: 235 daily

Services
Preceding station	Chichibu Railway	Following station
Bushū-Hino CR35 towards Mitsumineguchi	Chichibu Main Line Local	Urayamaguchi CR33 towards Hanyū
Location
- Location within Saitama Prefecture Location within Japan

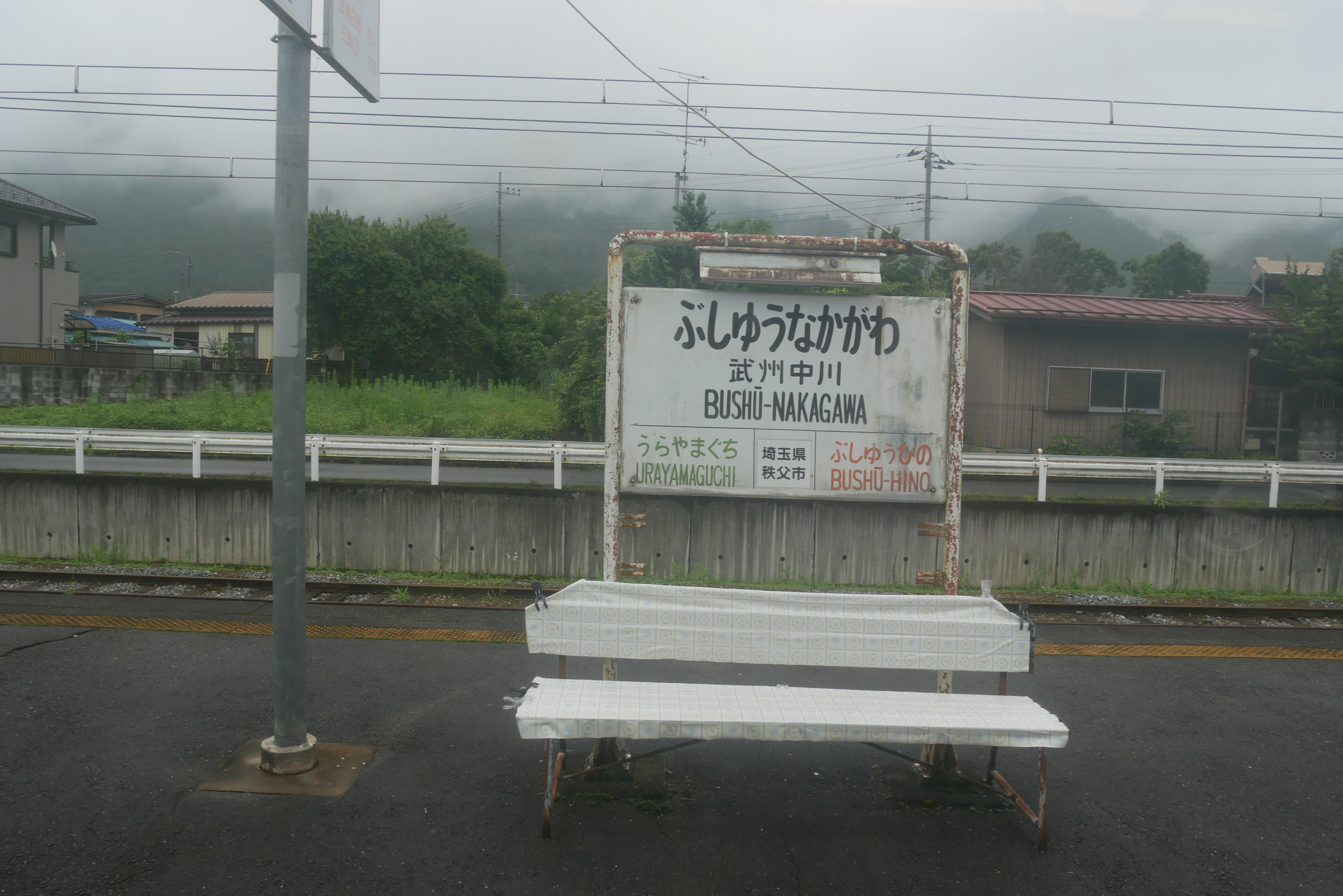
Station platform, 2019

Bushū-Nakagawa Station (武州中川駅, Bushū-Nakagawa-eki) is a passenger railway station located in the city of Chichibu, Saitama, Japan, operated by the private railway operator Chichibu Railway.

== Lines ==
Bushū-Nakagawa Station is served by the Chichibu Main Line from Hanyū to Mitsumineguchi, and is located 66.2 km from Hanyū. It is also served by through services to and from the Seibu Chichibu Line.

== Station layout ==
The station is staffed and consists of an island platform serving two tracks. A bidirectional loop for freight trains lies adjacent to track 2 on the south side, and another siding is provided adjacent to track 1 on the north side.

=== Platforms ===
1	■ Chichibu Main Line	for Chichibu, Yorii, Kumagaya, and Hanyū, and through services via Seibu Chichibu Line
2	■ Chichibu Main Line	for Mitsumineguchi

== History ==
Bushū-Nakagawa Station opened on 15 March 1930.

== Passenger statistics ==
In fiscal 2018, the station was used by an average of 235 passengers daily.

== Surrounding area ==
- Arakawa River
- National Route 140
- Chichibu Arakawa Higashi Elementary School
