= Takizawa Dam =

Dam in Saitama Prefecture, Japan

Takizawa dam
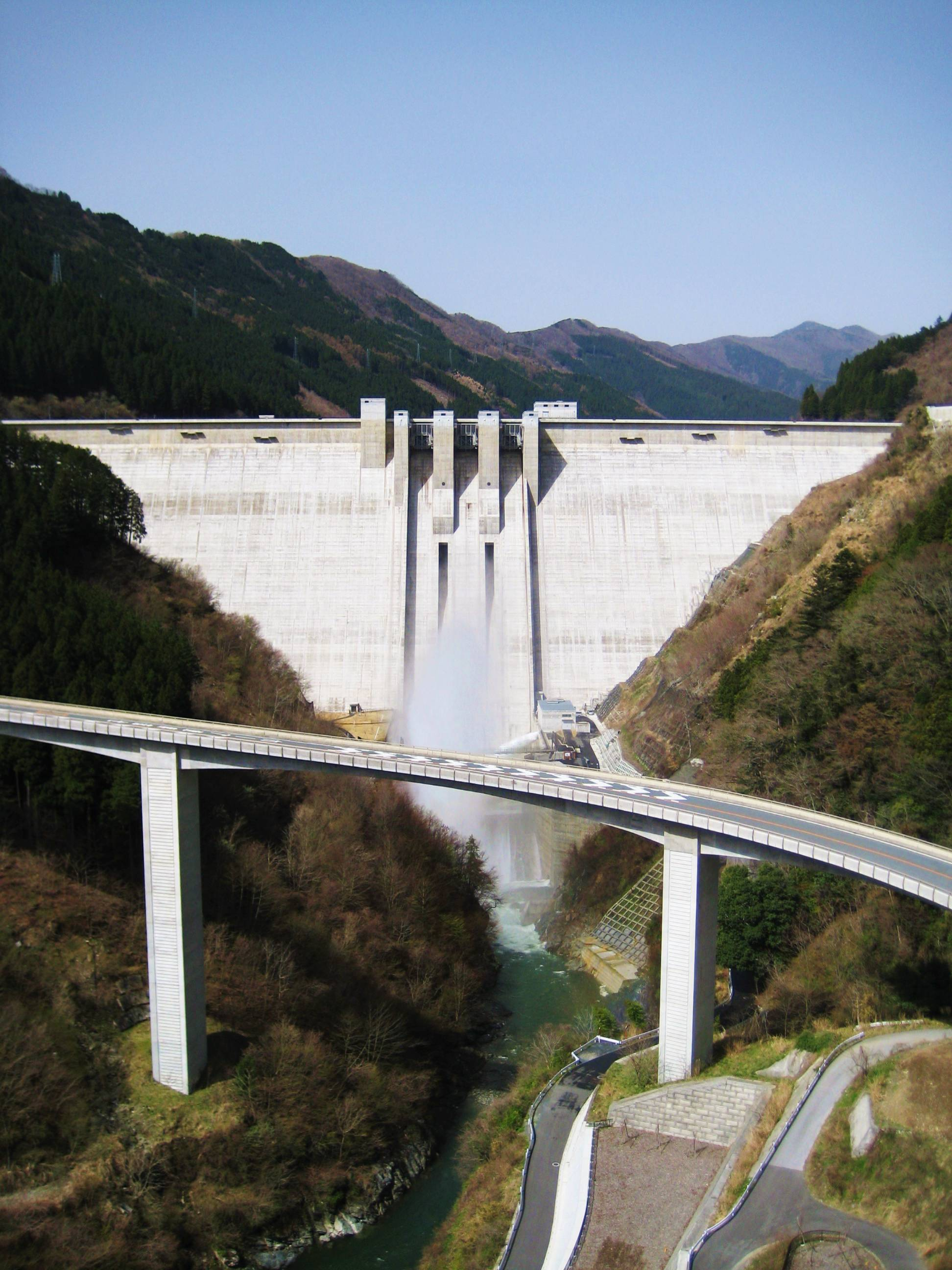
- Location: Saitama Prefecture, Japan
- Coordinates: 35°57′21″N 138°53′54″E
- Construction began: 1969
- Opening date: 2007

Dam and spillways
- Type of dam: Gravity
- Impounds: Nakatsu River
- Height: 132 m (433 ft)
- Length: 424 m (1,391 ft)

Reservoir
- Creates: Oku Chichibu Momiji Lake
- Total capacity: 60,000,000 m^{3} (2.1×10^{9} cu ft)
- Catchment area: 108.6 km^{2} (41.9 sq mi)
- Surface area: 145 hectares

Takizawa dam is a gravity dam located in Saitama prefecture in Japan. The dam serves for multipurpose including flood control, water supply and to generate hydro-electricity. The catchment area of the dam is 108.6 km^{2}. The dam impounds about 145 ha of land when full and can store 63 million cubic meters of water. The construction of the dam was started on 1969 and completed in 2007.
