= Tamayodo Dam =

Dam in Saitama Prefecture, Japan

Tamoyada dam
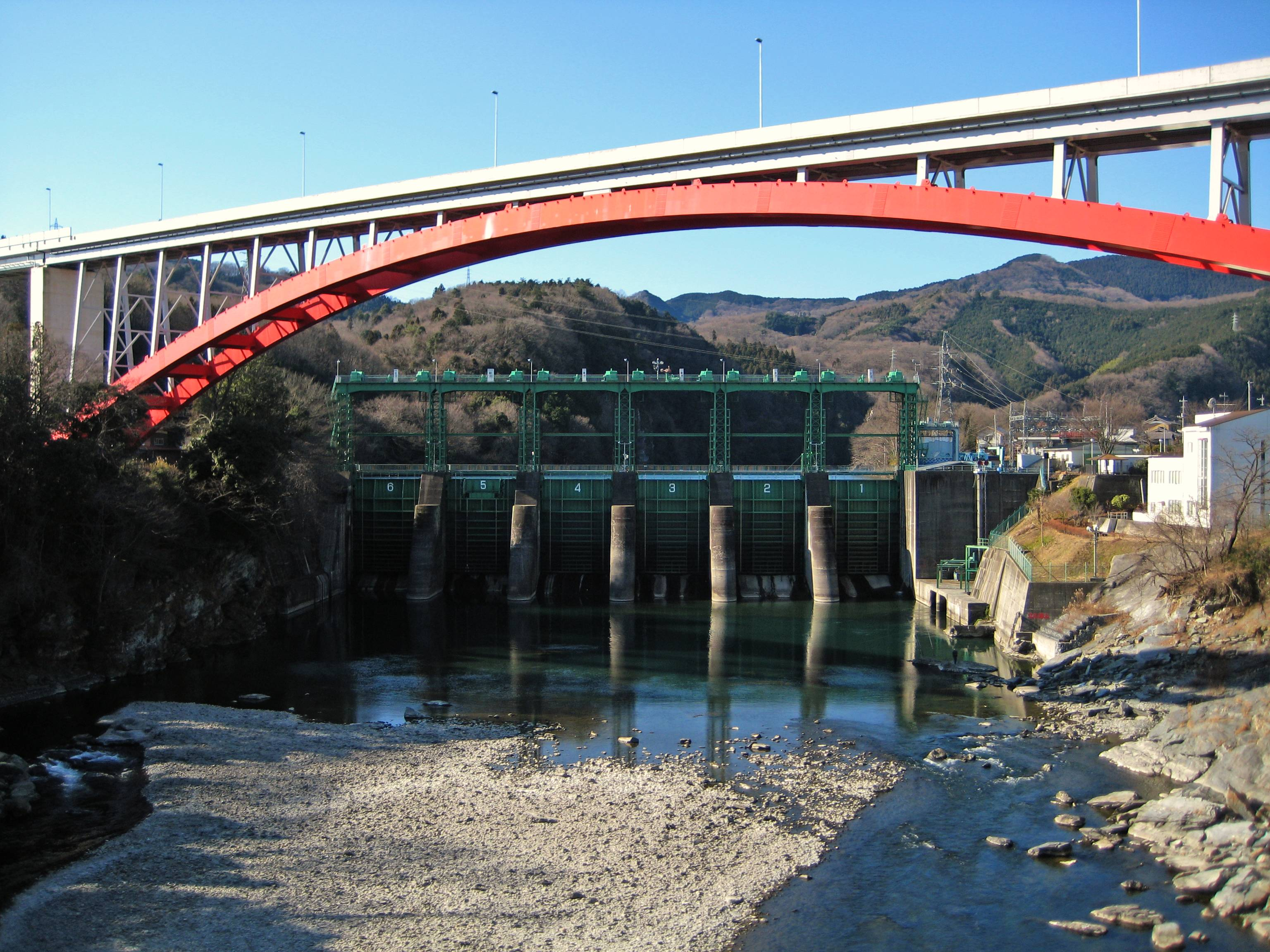
- Location: Saitama Prefecture, Japan
- Coordinates: 36°16′58″N 139°10′09″E
- Construction began: 1962
- Opening date: 1964

Dam and spillways
- Type of dam: Gravity
- Impounds: Arakawa River
- Height: 32 m (105 ft)
- Length: 110 m (360 ft)

Reservoir
- Total capacity: 3,501,000 m^{3} (123,600,000 cu ft)
- Catchment area: 896 km^{2} (346 sq mi)
- Surface area: 47 hectares

Tamoyada dam is a gravity barrage-dam located in Saitama prefecture in Japan. The structure is used to divert water for agriculture, and to generate hydro-electricity. The catchment area of the dam is 893 km^{2}. The dam impounds about 47ha of land when full and can store 3,501,000 cubic meters of water. The construction of the dam was started on 1962 and completed in 1964.
