= Barbara Adachi =

Asian-American business pioneer

- Occupation: Consulting Partner at Deloitte until her retirement in June of 2013
- Known for: She was the first Asian-American woman as a principal at the Deloitte office.
- Notable work: Honored as part of the Working Mother's Hall of Fame; Named a "working hero", by the Professional Business Women of California; Named one of the most influential women in San Francisco by the San Francisco Business Times from 2003 to 2008 and 2011 to 2012

Barbara Adachi is an American businesswoman. She retired from a 23-year career at Deloitte on June 1, 2013, where she served as a board member and a consulting partner.

== Personal life and education ==
Adachi is a third-generation Japanese American. She studied at the University of California, Santa Barbara, graduating with a Bachelor of Arts. She is married to Ted Adachi and the couple have one daughter. They live in San Francisco, California.

== Career ==
Adachi's first job was at a health insurance company, working as a secretary, and then as its first woman sales representative. She then worked at five other companies, before joining Deloitte in 1990. After establishing a human capital practice for Deloitte in San Francisco, she became a principal in 1995, the first Asian-American woman in that position. In 2001, she was promoted to leader of human capital for the western region, and in 2008, she became national managing principal for the Initiative for the Retention and the Advancement of Women of Deloitte. She was a consulting partner for Deloitte, and also served on the board.

In 2008, Adachi was inaugurated into the Working Mother's Hall of Fame. The following year, she was named a "working hero" by the Professional Business Women of California. She has been named one of the most influential women in San Francisco multiple times, from 2003 until 2008, and again, in 2011 and 2012, by the San Francisco Business Times. She has served on the board of numerous organizations, including the Girl Scouts of the USA. In 2012, she was honored at Consulting Magazine's Achievement Awards.

Adachi has published work in Forbes.
