= Miyatake Gaikotsu =

Japanese Author, Journalist and Media Historian

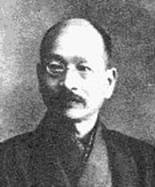
Miyatake Gaikotsu

Miyatake Gaikotsu (宮武 外骨, January 18, 1867 – July 28, 1955) was a Japanese author, journalist and media historian born in the Kagawa Prefecture. His given name was Miyatake Kameshiro (宮武 龜四郎).

The 28 February 1889 issue of Journal of the Society of Ready Wit (頓智協会雑誌, Tonchi Kyōkai Zasshi), published by Miyatake, printed a cartoon by Adachi Ginkō which parodies an earlier triptych of his own of Emperor Meiji receiving the Meiji Constitution of 1889, called View of the Issuance of the State Constitution in the State Chamber of the New Imperial Palace (新皇居於テ正殿憲法発布式之図, Shin kōkyo ni oite seiden kenpō happushiki no zu). The parody replaces the Emperor with a skeleton and is captioned: "Promulgation Ceremony for the Sharpening of the Ready Wit Law" (頓智研法発布式之図, "Tonchi kenpō happushiki no zu"). The skeleton was a play on words of the name of magazine's publisher Miyatake, whose given name is a homophone of the Japanese word gaikotsu ("skeleton").
