= Futase Dam =

Dam in Saitama Prefecture, Japan

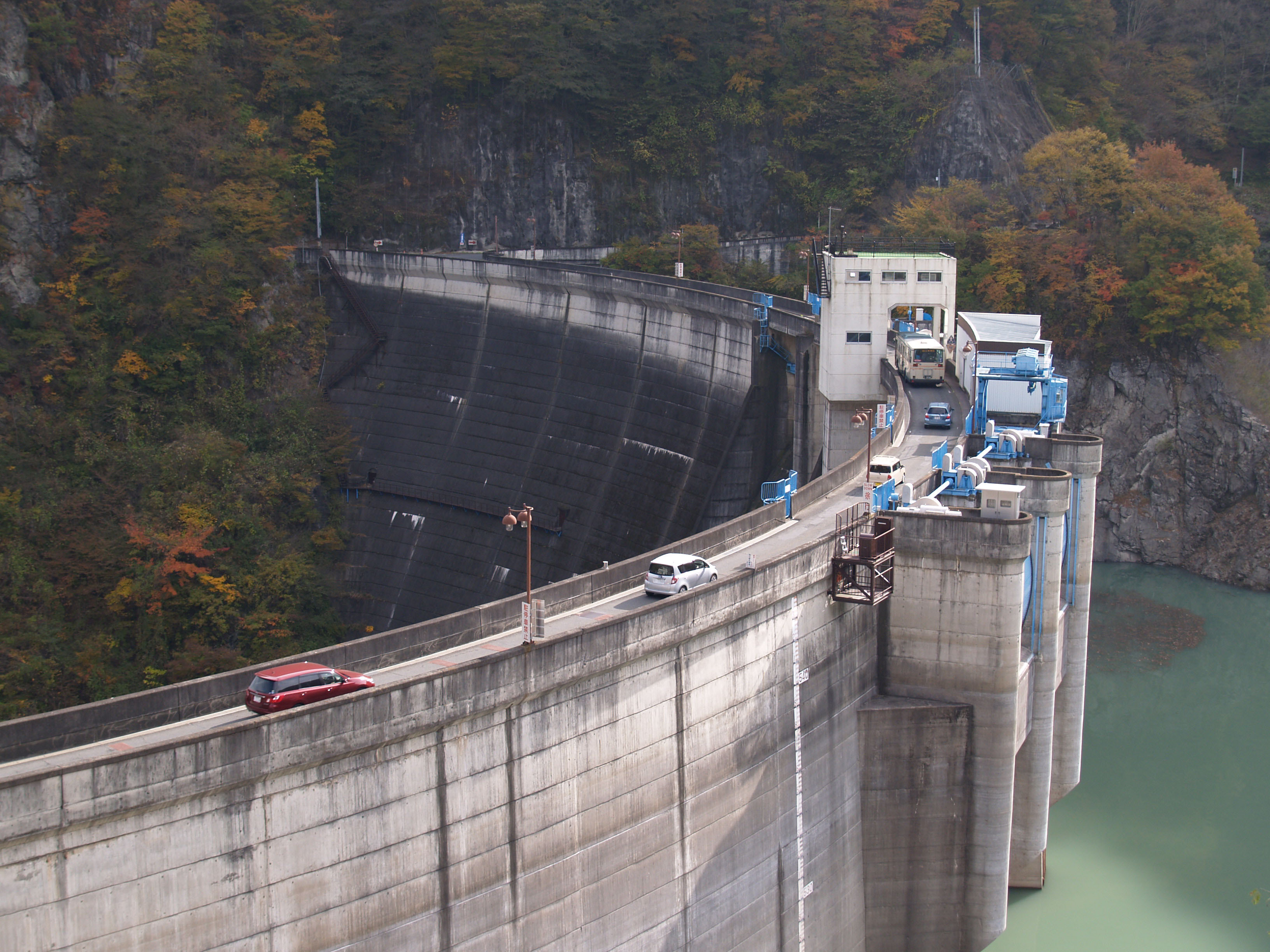
- Location: Saitama Prefecture, Japan
- Coordinates: 35°56′30″N 138°54′36″E
- Construction began: 1952
- Opening date: 1961

Dam and spillways
- Type of dam: Arch Gravity
- Impounds: Arakawa River
- Height: 95 m (312 ft)
- Length: 288.5 m (947 ft)

Reservoir
- Creates: Lake Chichibu
- Total capacity: 26,900,000 m^{3} (950,000,000 cu ft)
- Catchment area: 170 km^{2} (66 sq mi)
- Surface area: 76 hectares

Futase Dam is an arch gravity dam located in Saitama prefecture in Japan. The dam was constructed to control floods and to generate hydro-electricity. The catchment area of the dam is 170 km^{2}. The dam impounds about 76 ha of land when full and can store 26.9 million cubic meters of water. The construction of the dam was started on 1952 and completed in 1961.

In 2003 a sediment removal program was started to remove 100,000m3 of sediment that was deposited in the reservoir.
