= Toshiya Adachi =

Japanese baseball player (born 1965)

- Infielder
- Born: June 12, 1965 (age 60); Kariya, Aichi Japan
- Batted: Switch Threw: Right

debut
- July 9, 1985, for the Kintetsu Buffaloes

Last appearance
- April 26, 1996, for the Kintetsu Buffaloes

Career statistics
- Batting average: .222
- Home runs: 4
- Hits: 943
- Runs batted in: 58

Teams
- Kintetsu Buffaloes (1984 – 1996)

Toshiya Adachi (安達 俊也, Adachi Toshiya; born June 12, 1965) is a retired Japanese Nippon Professional Baseball player with the Kintetsu Buffaloes.
