= Kakkaku Dam =

Dam in Saitama Prefecture, Japan

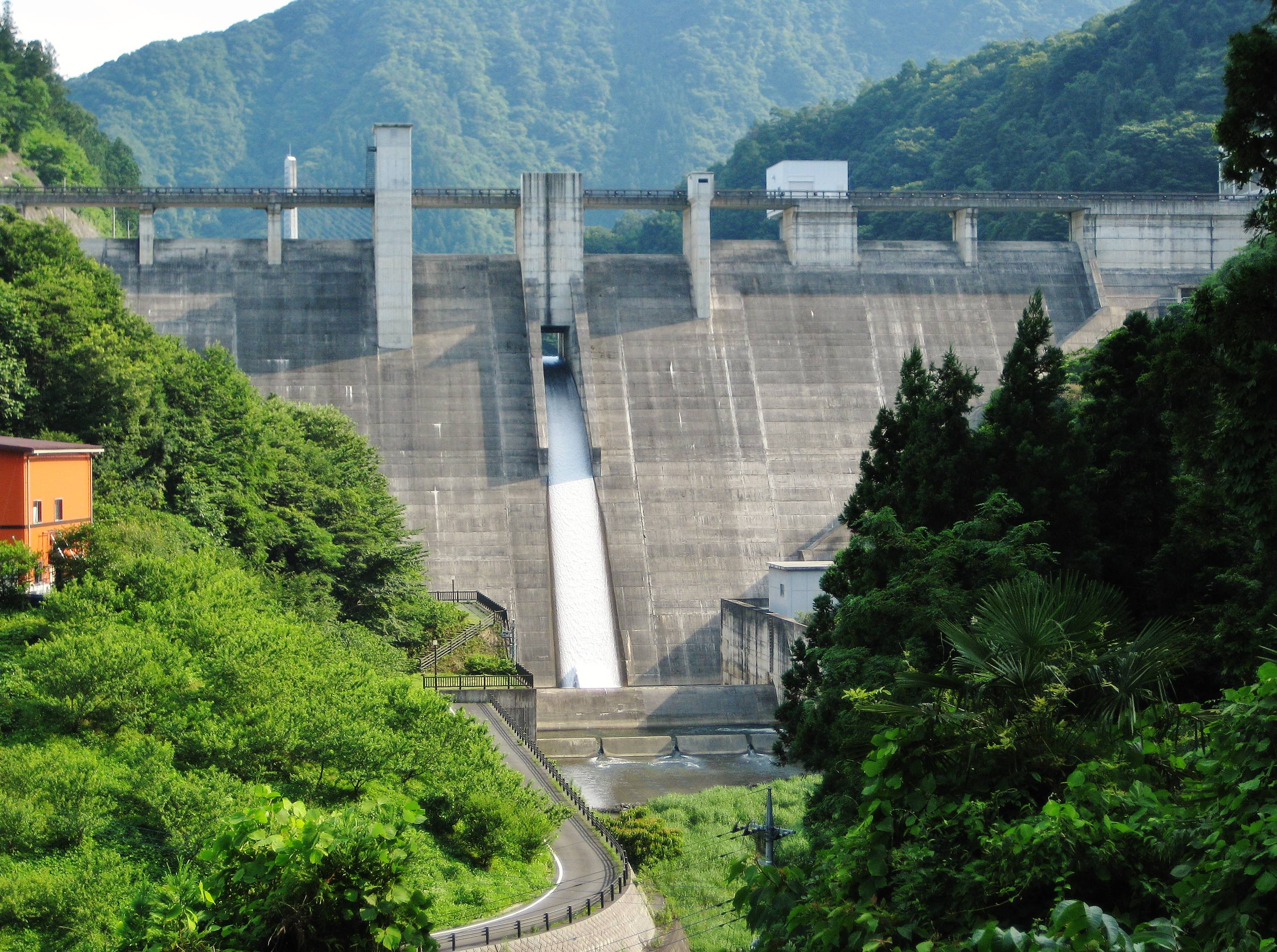
- Interactive map of Kakkaku Dam
- Location: Saitama Prefecture, Japan
- Construction began: 1970
- Opening date: 2001

Dam and spillways
- Type of dam: Gravity
- Impounds: Yoshida River
- Height: 60.9 m (200 ft)
- Length: 195 m (640 ft)

Reservoir
- Creates: Nishi Chichibumomo Lake
- Total capacity: 10,250,000 m^{3} (362,000,000 cu ft)
- Catchment area: 32.1 km^{2} (12.4 sq mi)
- Surface area: 56 hectares

Kakkaku dam is a gravity dam located in Saitama prefecture in Japan.

== Function ==
The dam was constructed to control flood and to supply drinking water. The catchment area of the dam is 32.1 km^{2}. The dam impounds about 56 ha of land when full and can store 10.25 million cubic meters of water. The construction of the dam was started on 1970 and completed in 2001.

== Location ==
The dam is located in the Yoshida River which is a tributary of Arakawa River. Before the construction of the dam, the excavation revealed that the location was covered by ocean based on the fossils found.
