= Shōtarō Adachi =

Japanese photographer

Shōtarō Adachi (足立 正太郎, Adachi Shōtarō; 1901–1995) was a Japanese photographer.
