= Tsunamitsu Adachi =

Japanese entomologist

Tsunamitsu Adachi (安立 綱光, Adachi Tsunamitsu; 15 September 1901 – 2 December 1981) was a Japanese entomologist.

A soldier from 1921 to 1922, Tsunamitsu Adachi entered the faculty of agriculture of the University of Tokyo in 1925. Here he became an assistant in 1932 then an associate professor in 1948. In 1954, he accepted the post of professor at Toyo University. He retired in 1976.

Adachi was the author 75 scientific papers, principally on entomology, most on Staphylinidae. He was the author of eleven new species all from Japan.

== Sources ==
Lee H. Herman (2001). Catalog of the Staphylinidae (Insecta: Coleoptera). 1758 to the end of the Second Millennium. I. Introduction, History, Biographical Sketches, and Omaliine Group, Bulletin of the American Museum of Natural History, 265 : i+vi + 649 p. (ISSN 0003-0090)
