= Adachi clan =

Japanese family of samurai

Adachi clan 安達氏
- Home province: Dewa, Kōzuke, Musashi
- Parent house: Minamoto, Fujiwara Hok-ke
- Titles: Various
- Founder: Adachi Morinaga
- Final ruler: Adachi Takakage
- Founding year: 12th century

The Adachi clan (安達氏) is a samurai family said to be descended from Fujiwara no Yamakage (d. March 24, 888). Their historical significance derives from their successes during the Genpei War and their subsequent affiliation with the Hōjō clan.

Important figures of the clan are:

- Adachi Kagemori
- Adachi Morinaga

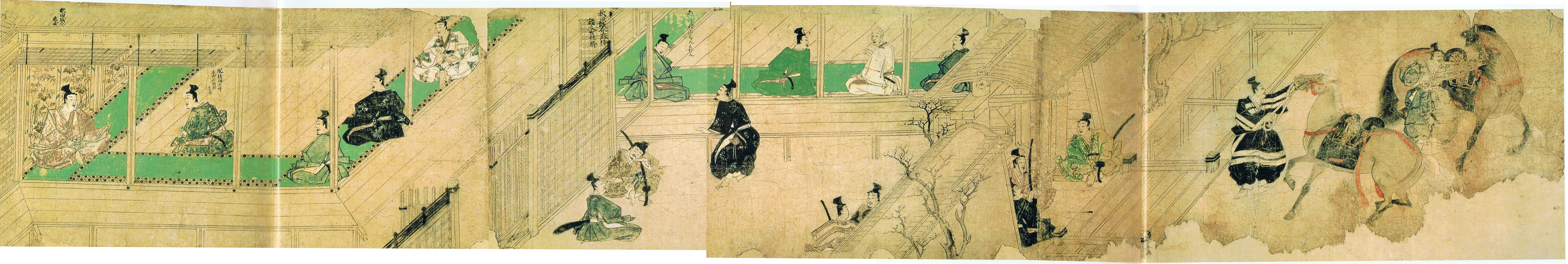
The Mōko Shūrai Ekotoba, painted during the middle of the Kamakura period, showing the Adachi clan residence at Amanawa.

== Genealogy ==
Bold names denote the head of family. Solid lines denote direct relations. The superscript numbers show the line of succession. The organization is in birth order.

Odano Kanehiro
Fujiwara no Tōgen	**Adachi Morinaga**^{1}
Adachi Tōmoto	**Kagemori**^{2}	Tokinaga
Matsushita Zenni	**Yoshikage**^{3}	Ōsone Nagayasu
Yorikage	Kagemura	**Yasumori**^{4}	Tokimori	Akimori	Nagakage	Kakusan-ni
Mutō Kageyasu	Ōmuro Yasumune	**Munekage**^{5}	Morimune	Mugai Nyodai	Muneaki
Kakukai Enjō	Sadayasu	**Tokiaki**^{6}
**Takakage**^{7}
