= Kagemori Station =

Railway station in Chichibu, Saitama Prefecture, Japan

CR32 Kagemori Station 影森駅
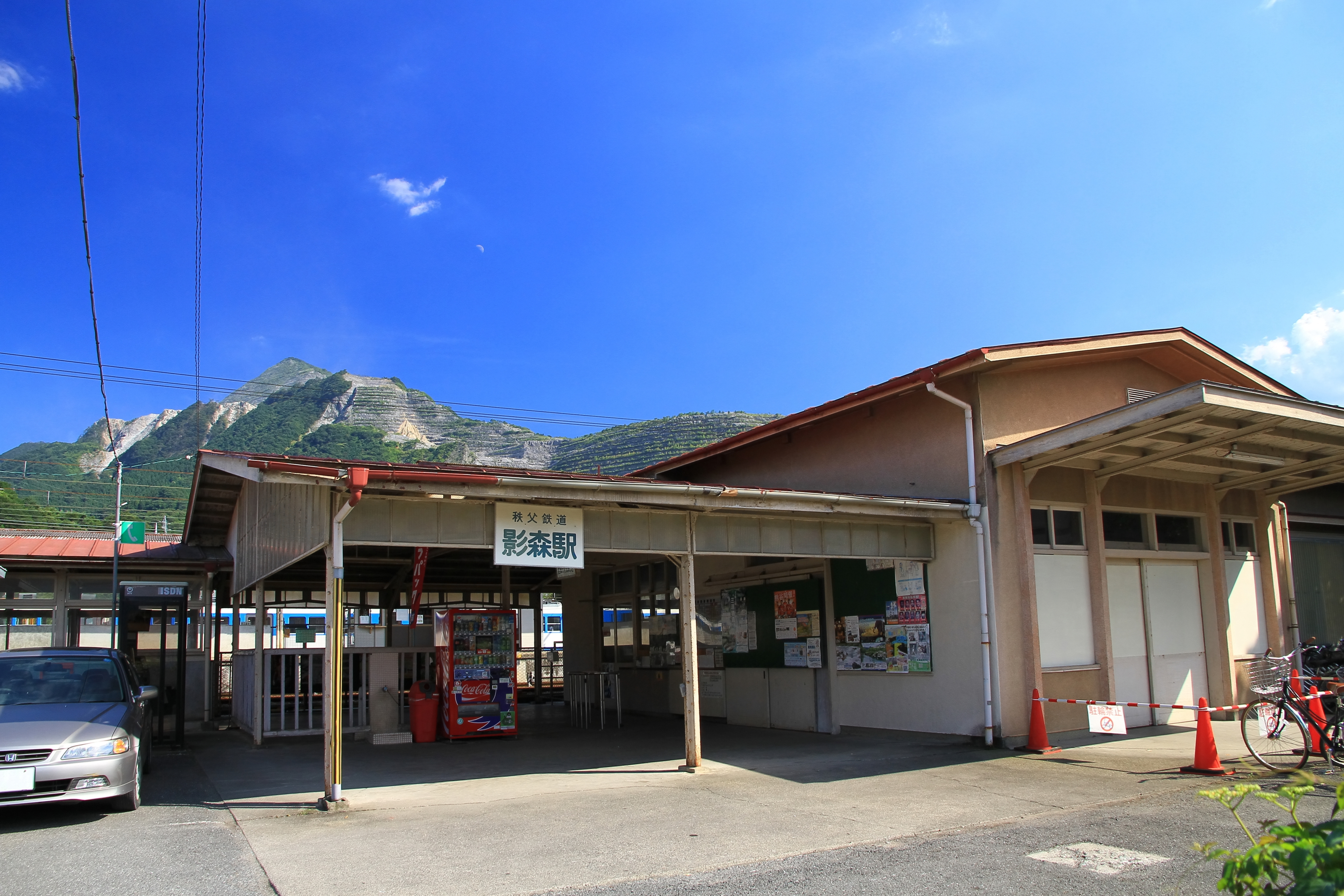
- Kagemori Station, August 2012

General information
- Location: 71-4 Kami-kagemori, Chichibu-shi, Saitama-ken 369-1872; Japan
- Coordinates: 35°58′19.65″N 139°4′5.28″E
- Operator: Chichibu Railway
- Line: ■ Chichibu Main Line
- Distance: 62.4 km from Hanyū
- Platforms: 1 island platform

Other information
- Status: Staffed
- Website: Official website

History
- Opened: 15 March 1930

Passengers
- FY2018: 494 daily

Services
Preceding station	Chichibu Railway	Following station
Mitsumineguchi CR37 Terminus	Chichibu Main Line Rapid Chichibuji	Ohanabatake CR31 towards Hanyū
Urayamaguchi CR33 towards Mitsumineguchi	Chichibu Main Line Local	Ohanabatake CR31 towards Hanyū
Location
- Location within Saitama Prefecture Location within Japan

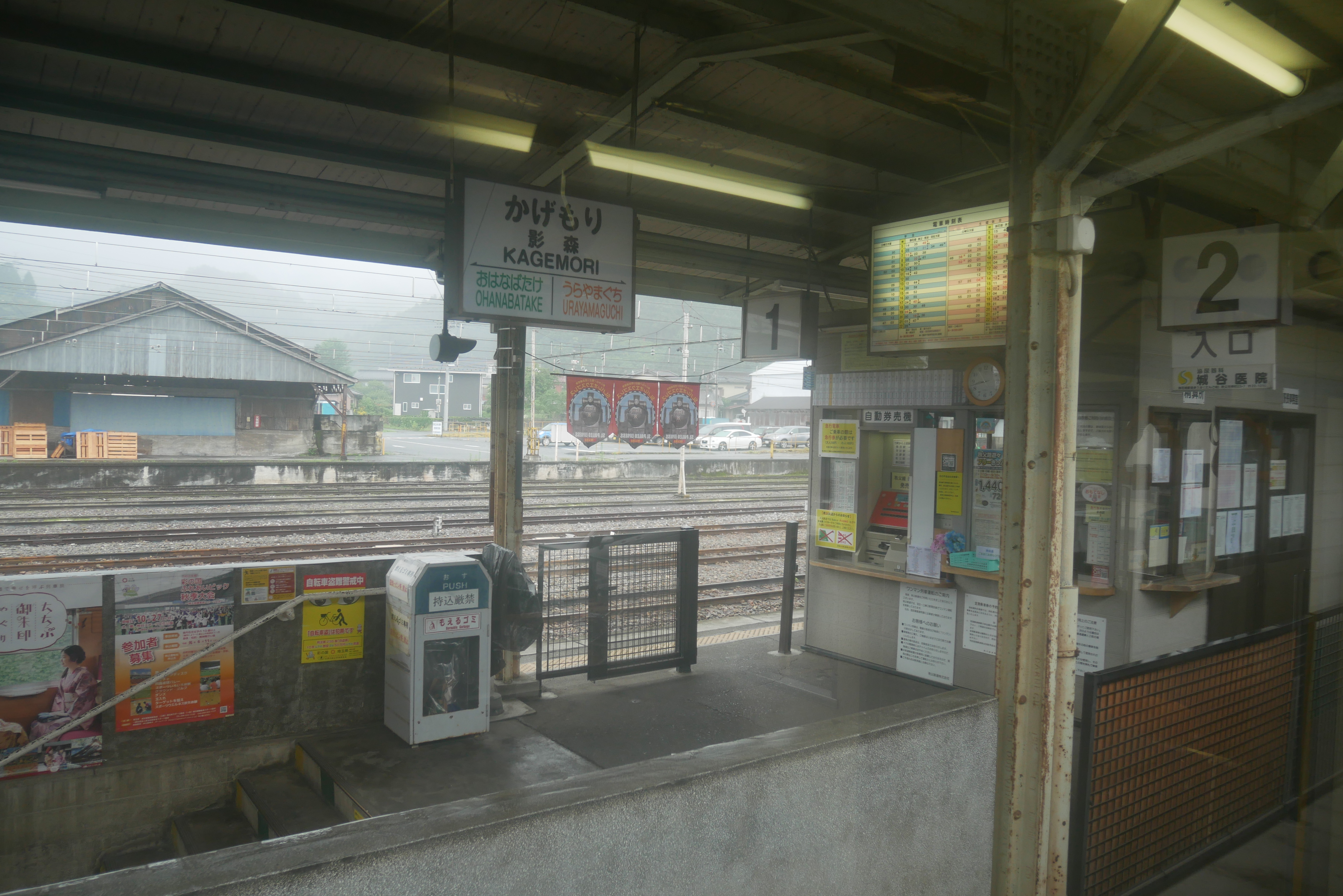
Inside the station, 2019

Kagemori Station (影森駅, Kagemori-eki)is a passenger railway station located in the city of Chichibu, Saitama, Japan, operated by the private railway operator Chichibu Railway.

== Lines ==
Kagemori Station is served by the Chichibu Main Line from Hanyū to Mitsumineguchi, and is located 62.4 km from Hanyū. It is also served by through services to and from the Seibu Chichibu Line.

== Station layout ==
The station is staffed and consists of a single island platforms serving two bidirectional tracks. Storage tracks alongside platform 1 are used to stable rolling stock and also for freight trains arriving and departing on the private spur line to the Chichibu Taiheiyo Cement Corporation Minowa Mine approximately 1 km south of the station.

=== Platforms ===
1	■ Chichibu Main Line	for Mitsumineguchi
2	■ Chichibu Main Line	for Chichibu, Yorii, Kumagaya, and Hanyū
2	■ Seibu Chichibu Line	for Seibu-Chichibu, Hannō, and Ikebukuro

== History ==
Kagemori Station opened on 27 September 1917.

== Passenger statistics ==
In fiscal 2018, the station was used by an average of 494 passengers daily.

== Surrounding area ==
- Arakawa River
- National Route 140
- Chichibu Kagemori Junior High School
- Chichibu Taiheiyo Cement Corporation Minowa Mine
