= Adachi Kagemori =

Japanese warrior (died 1248)

- 安達 景盛
- Died: 1248
- Children: Matsushita Zen-ni; Adachi Yoshikage
- Relatives: Adachi Morinaga (father)
- Military career
- Allegiance: Japanese
- Branch: Adachi clan
- Rank: Warrior

Adachi Kagemori (安達 景盛) (died 1248) was a Japanese warrior. He was part of the Adachi clan, and then he joined the Hojo clan. He was the son of Adachi Morinaga, who was a close advisor to Minamoto no Yoritomo. Kagemori played a significant role as a gokenin and was a trusted advisor to Minamoto no Sanetomo

Kagemori's influence and loyalty to the Hojo clan helped solidify the Adachi clan's power in the provinces of Musashi, Kozuke, and Dewa.
