= Urayama Dam =

Dam in Saitama Prefecture, Japan

Urayama dam
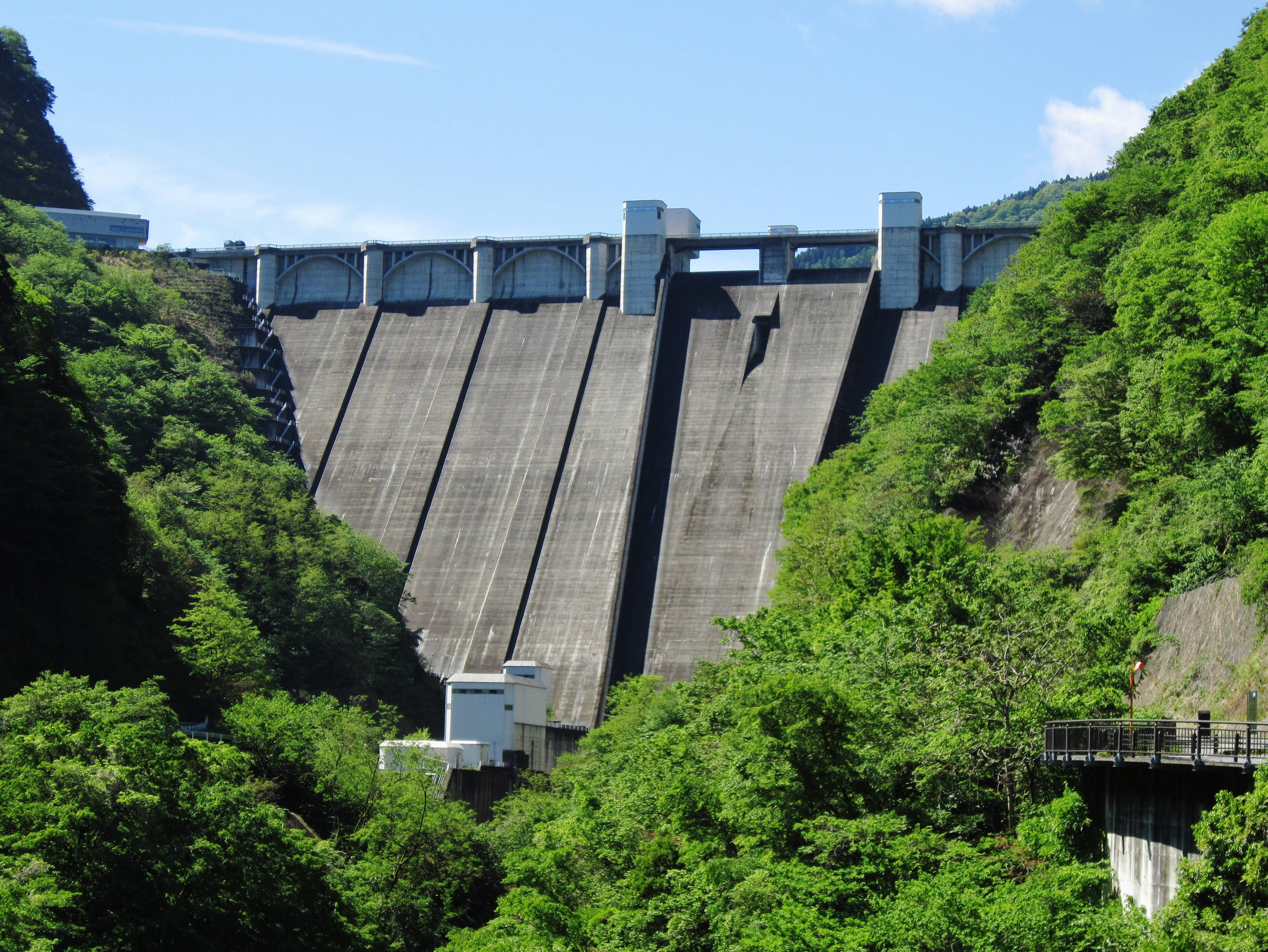
- Location: Saitama Prefecture, Japan
- Coordinates: 35°57′13″N 139°03′08″E
- Construction began: 1972
- Opening date: 1998

Dam and spillways
- Height: 156 m
- Length: 372 m

Reservoir
- Total capacity: 58 million m^{3}
- Catchment area: 51.6 km^{2}
- Surface area: 120 hectares

Urayama dam is a roller compacted concrete gravity dam located in Saitama prefecture in Japan. The dam serves for multiple purpose including water-supply for domestic purpose, power generation, and flood control. The catchment area of the dam is 51.6 km^{2}. The dam impounds about 120ha of land when full and can store 58 million cubic meters of water. The construction of the dam was started on 1972 and completed in 1988. The dam is constructed across the Urayama river which is a tributary of Arakawa River.
