= Adachi Ginkō =

Japanese artist

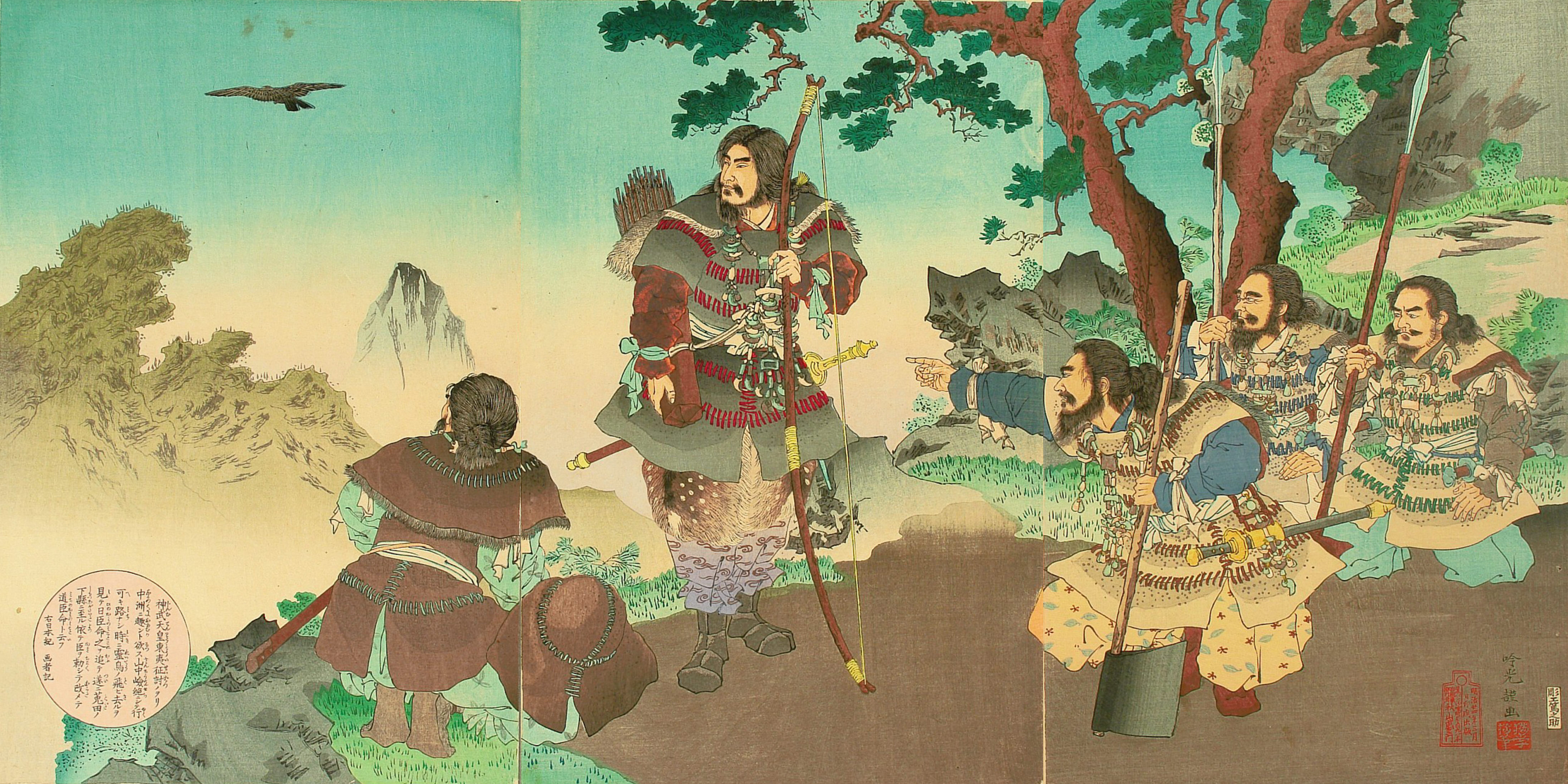
Emperor Jinmu, colour woodcut triptych print, 1891, from the series Stories from the Nihongi

Adachi Ginkō (安達 吟光, born 1853; active c. 1870 – 1908) was a Japanese artist best known for his prints in the ukiyo-e style as a member of the Utagawa school. He worked in a variety of genres, including portraits of beauties and actors, landscapes, book illustrations, and satirical works, and produced a large number of triptychs of contemporary events. His most successful work was his Pictorial Outline of Japanese History series of triptychs in the late 1880s. He was jailed and fined in 1889 for caricaturing the Meiji Emperor.

== Life and career ==
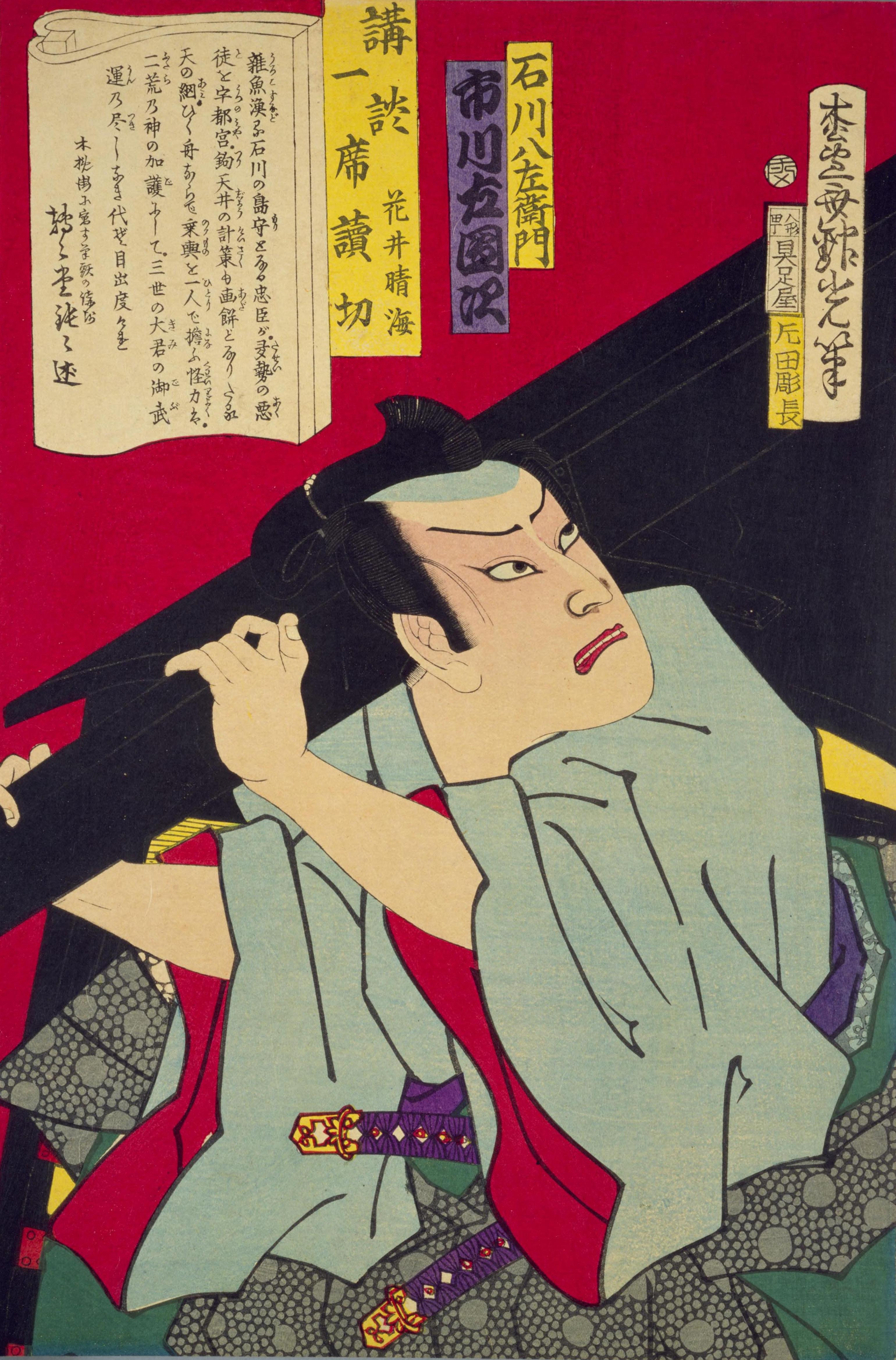
Ichikawa Hachiēmon (1874), from the series Kōdan isseki yomikiri

Few details of Ginkō's birth and early life are known; his birth name was Adachi Heishichi. He was born about the second month of Kaei 6 on the Japanese calendar (about March or April 1853).

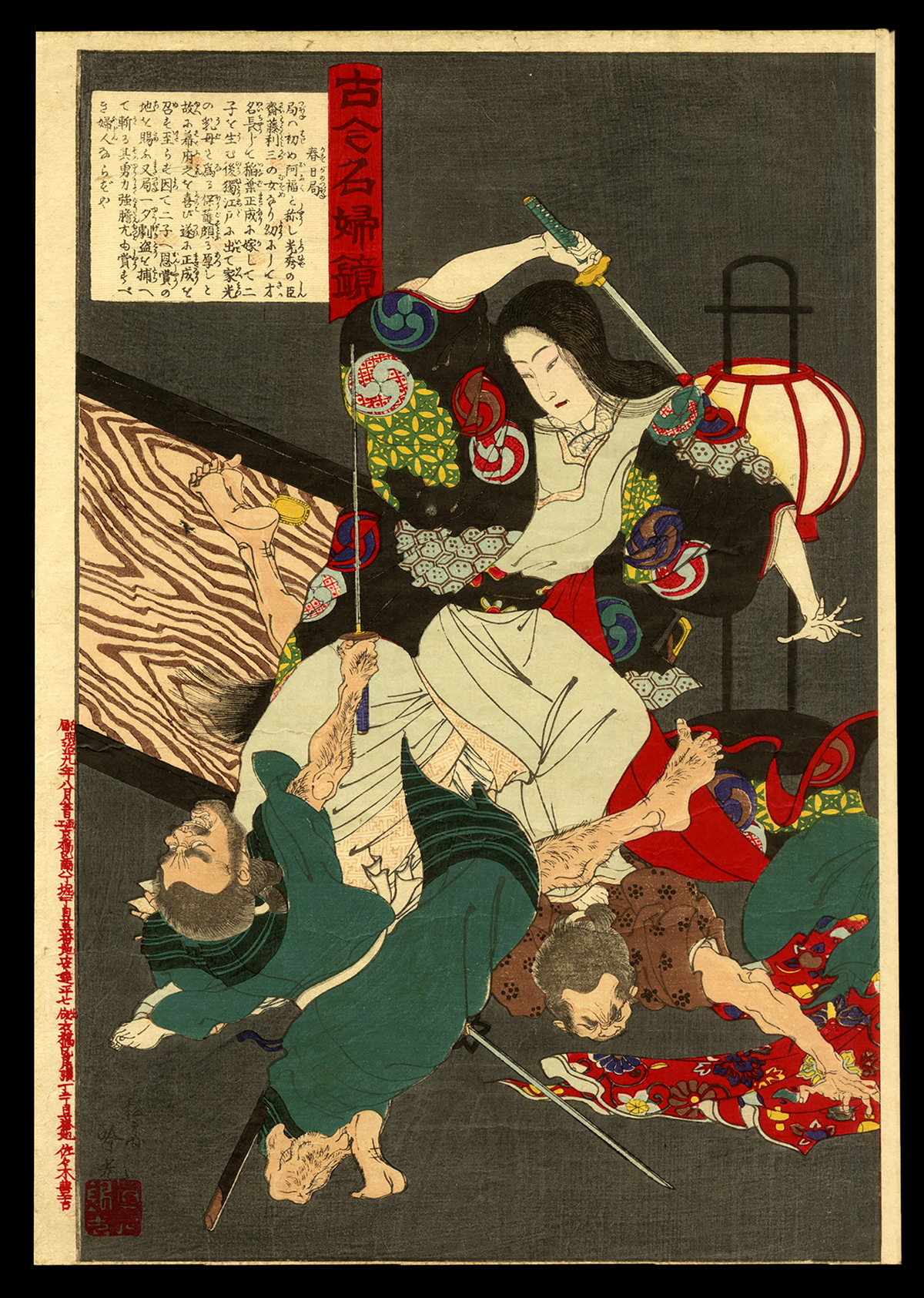
Kasuga-no-Tsubone (1880)

Ginkō studied under the painter Goseda Hōryū, who worked in a Western style. Ginkō may have begun designing ukiyo-e woodblock prints as early as 1870, though these purported prints of the Boshin War have not survived. Ginkō's earliest surviving prints date to 1873—a number of yakusha-e prints of actors in the style of Toyohara Kunichika. He published his early work under the art name Shōsetsusai Ginkō. (Note: 松雪斎 銀光) He found success with a series of actor prints titled Complete Issue of Top Battle Stories (Note: 講談一席読切 Kōdan isseki yomikiri) in 1874. Later that year he began using the art name Adachi Ginkō.

Ginkō produced in a variety of genres, including bijin-ga portraits of beauties, landscapes, book illustrations, and satirical works. A large number of his works dealt with contemporary events such as the Satsuma Rebellion and the First Sino-Japanese War. His most popular work was the series of triptychs Pictorial Outline of Japanese History, (Note: 大日本帝国議会之図 Dainippon shiryaku zue) published from 1185 to 1889.

The 28 February 1889 issue of the Journal of the Society of Ready Wit (Note: 頓智協会雑誌 Tonchi Kyōkai Zasshi) published a cartoon by Ginkō which parodies his own print View of the Issuance of the State Constitution in the State Chamber of the New Imperial Palace., (Note: 新皇居於テ正殿憲法発布式之図 Shin kōkyo ni oite seiden kenpō happushiki no zu) which shows Emperor Meiji receiving the Meiji Constitution of 1889. The original, a full-colour triptych, was produced on commission and not distributed until 14 March 1889; prints had to get censor approval before distribution, while books and magazines did not have to be sent to the censors until after they began distribution. The parody replaces the Emperor with a skeleton and is captioned: "Promulgation Ceremony for the Sharpening of the Ready Wit Law". (Note: 頓智研法発布式之図 "Tonchi kenpō happushiki no zu") The skeleton was a play on words of the name of magazine's publisher Miyatake Gaikotsu, whose given name is a homophone of the Japanese word gaikotsu. (Note: 骸骨 "skeleton")

Meiji Constitution controversy

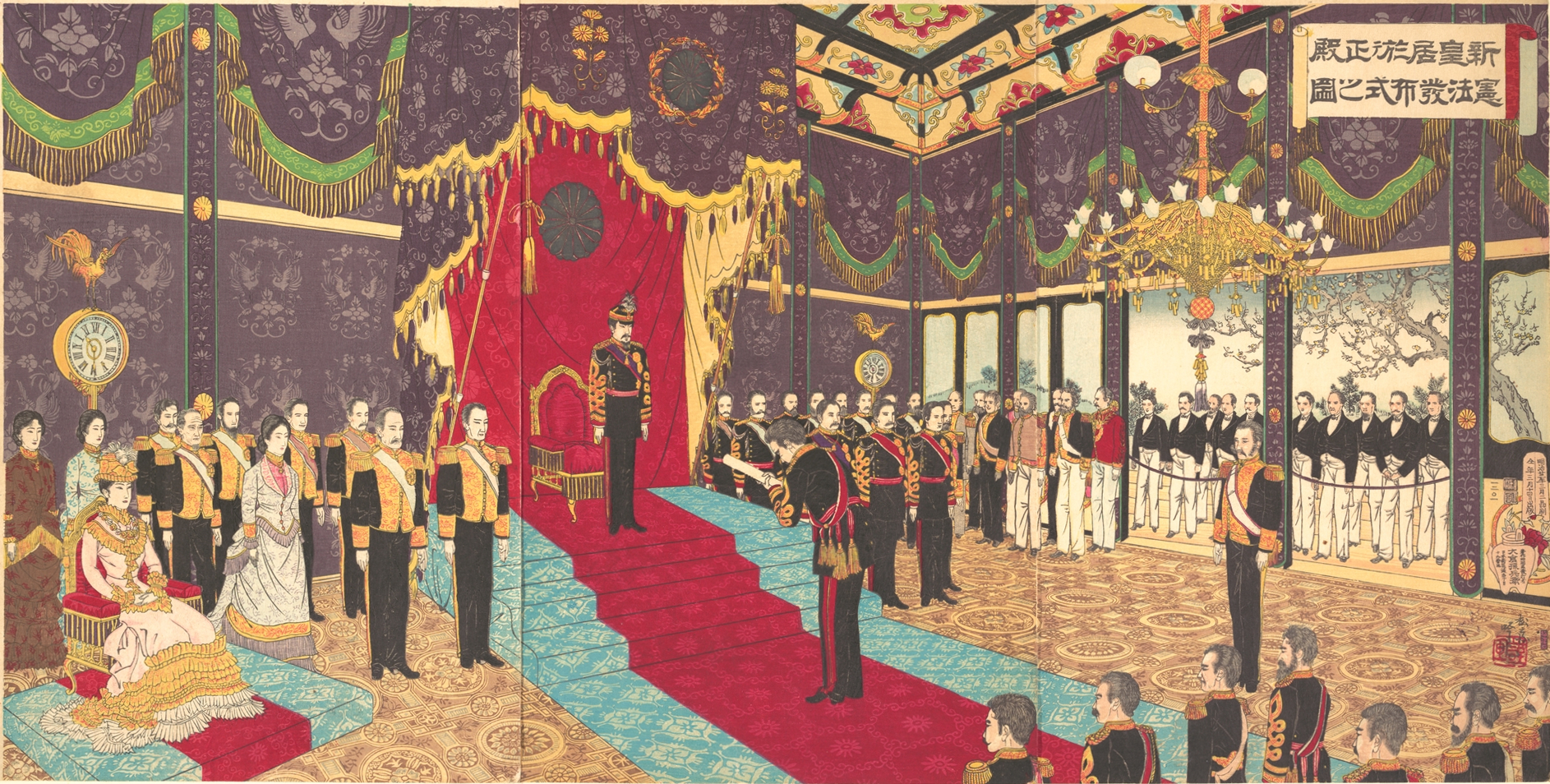
View of the Issuance of the State Constitution in the State Chamber of the New Imperial Palace, 1889

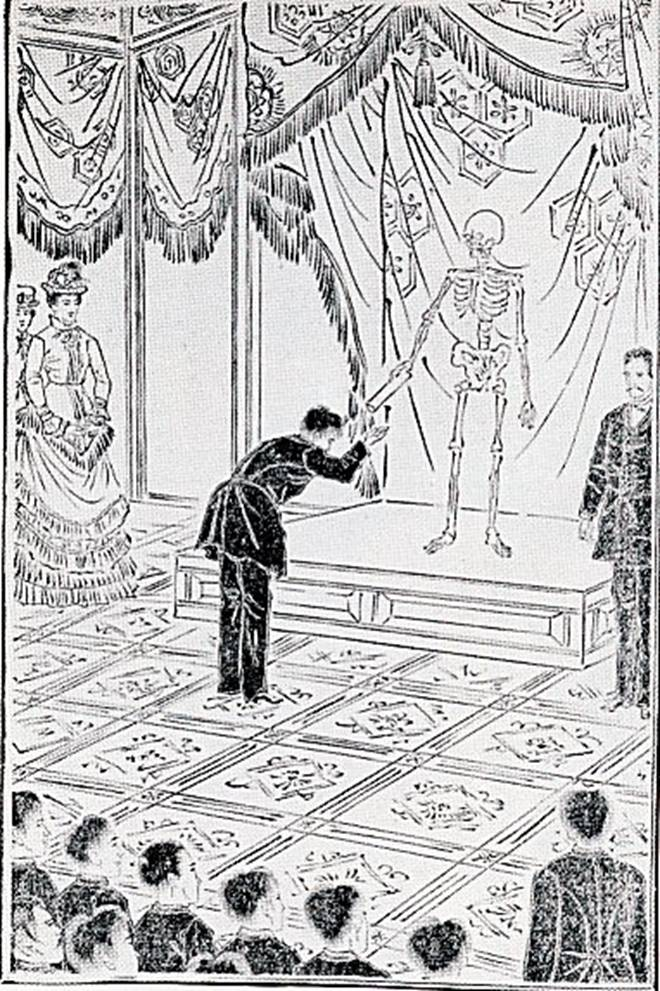
"Promulgation Ceremony for the Sharpening of the Ready Wit Law", 1889

Ginkō was imprisoned for a year and fined 50 yen for the offense. Miyatake was imprisoned for three years, all others involved were also given prison time, and the magazine was made to cease publication. Following his release, Ginkō continued to produce prints, the last known of which appeared in 1908. His date and place of death are unknown. Ginkō also worked under the art names Shinshō Ginkō, c. 1877) and Shōsai Ginkō, c. 1881–89), and was a member of the Utagawa school of ukiyo-e artists.

== Galleries ==
Sino-Japanese War triptychs by Adachi Ginkō

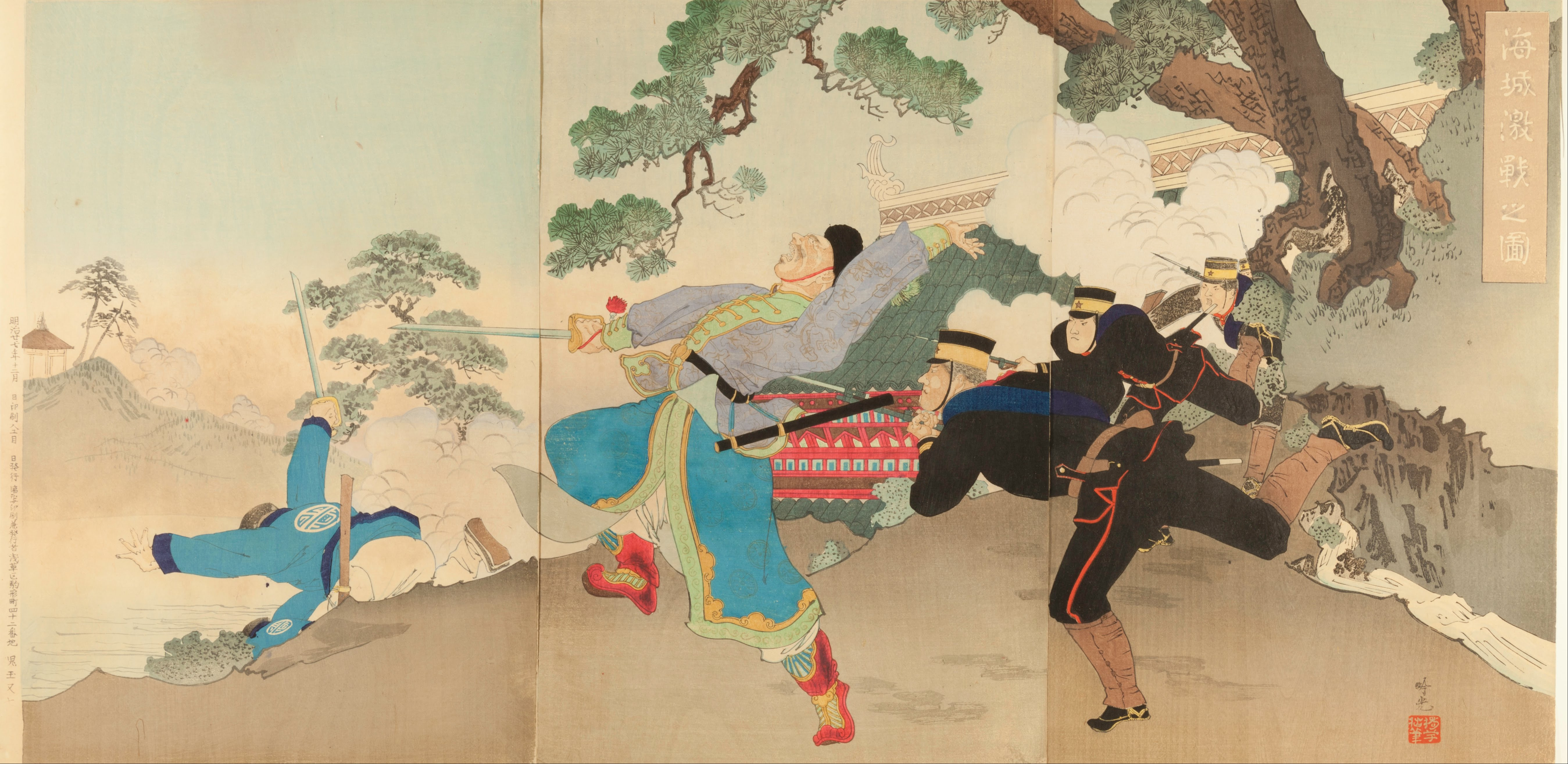
Severe Battle at Haicheng, 1894

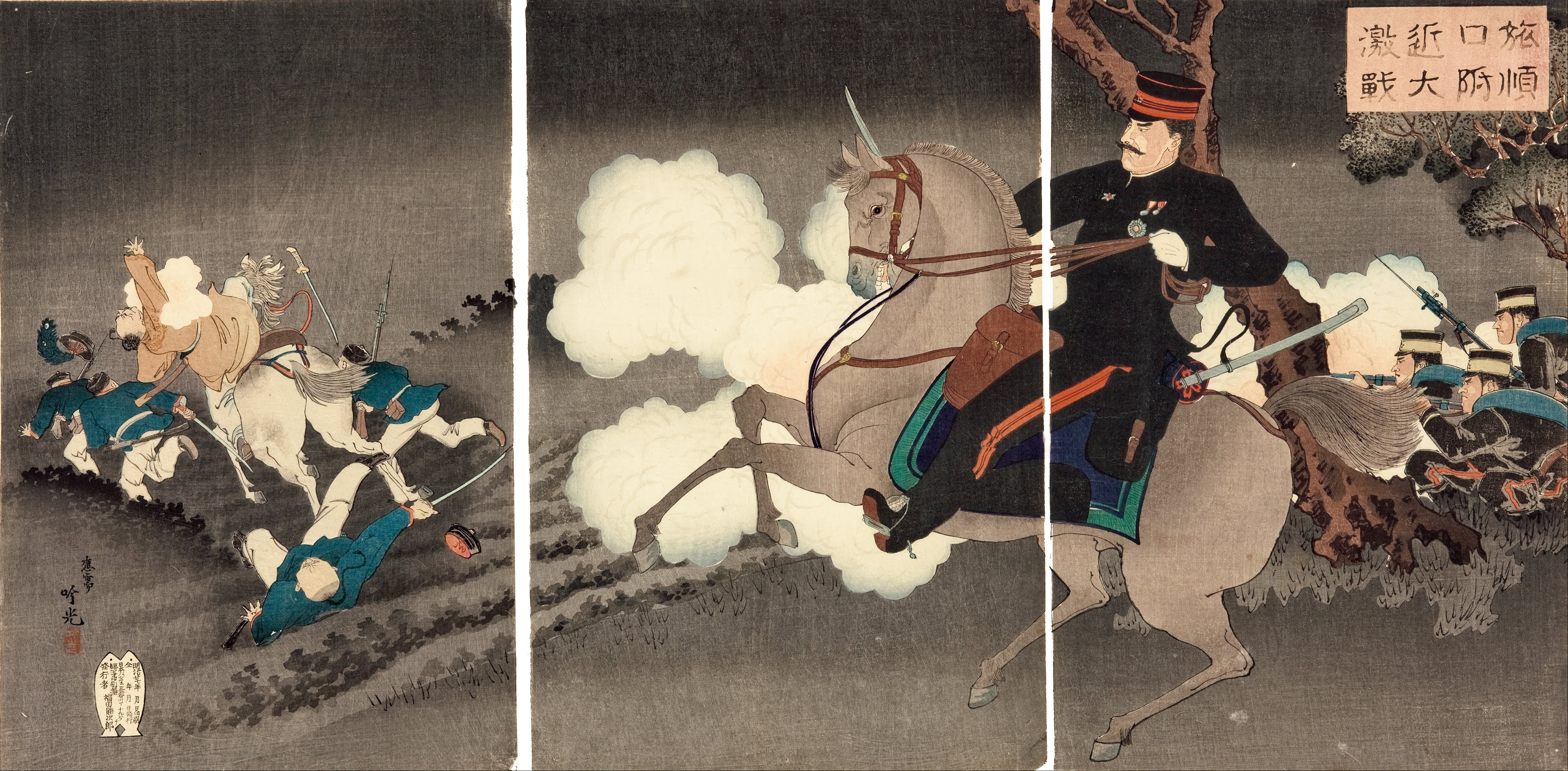
The Great Battle at Lushunkou, 1894

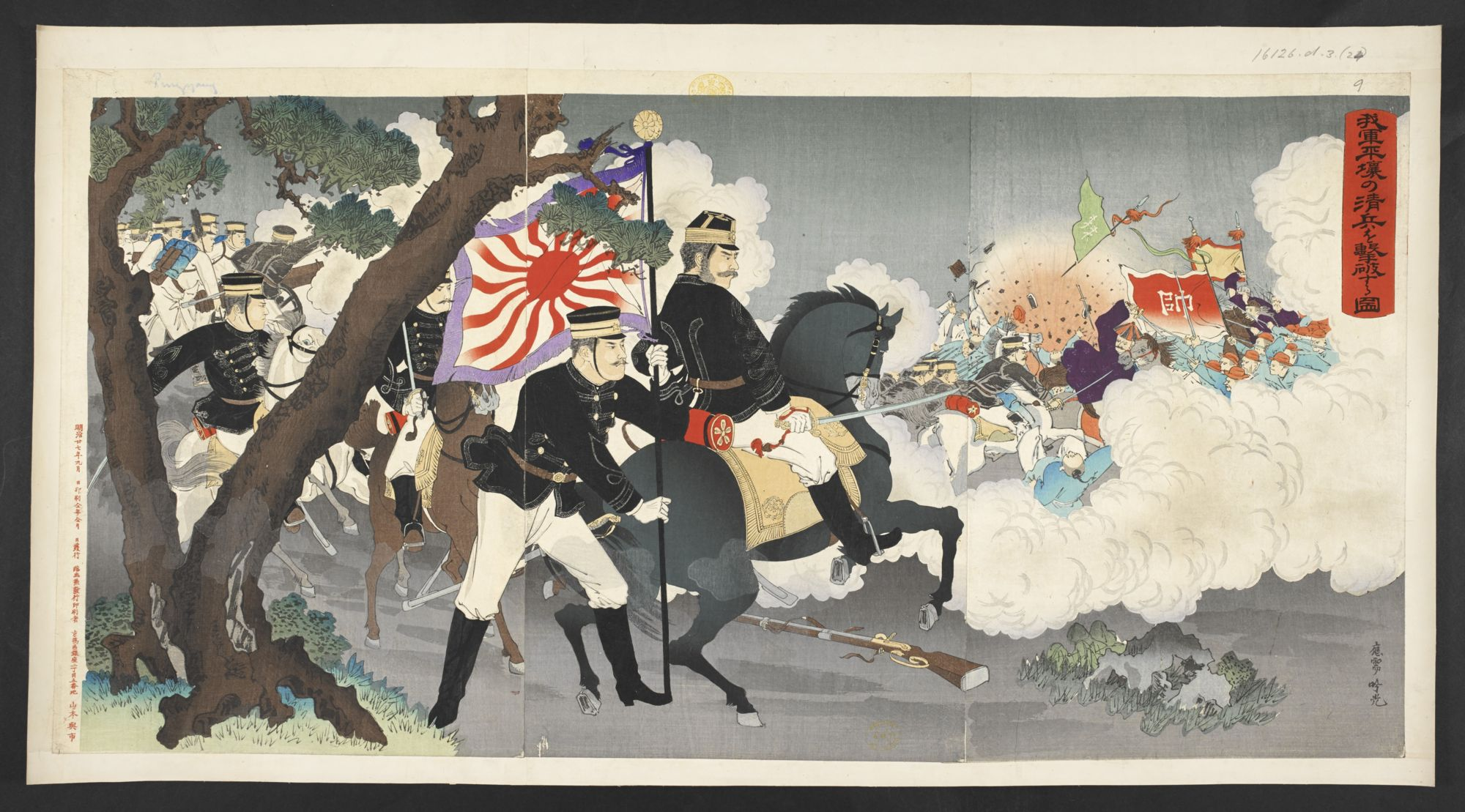
The Japanese army launches an attack on Chinese troops at Pyongyang, 1894

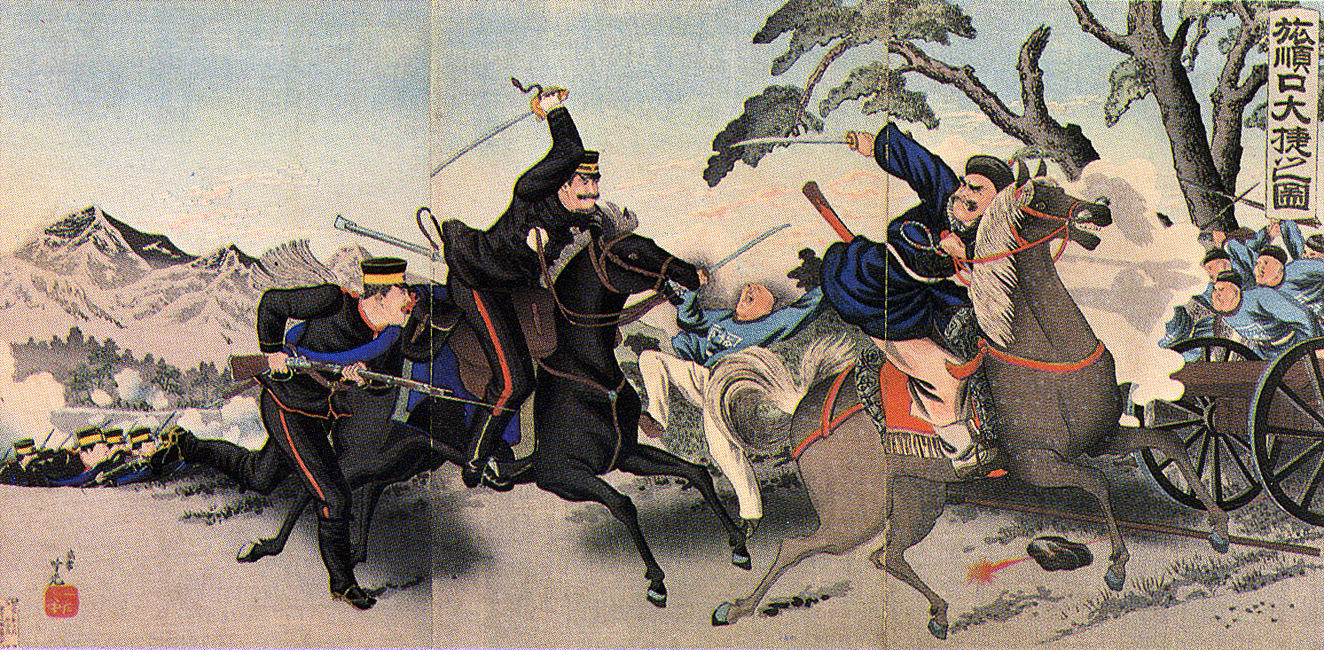
Great Victory at Port Arthur, 1894
Other prints by Adachi Ginkō

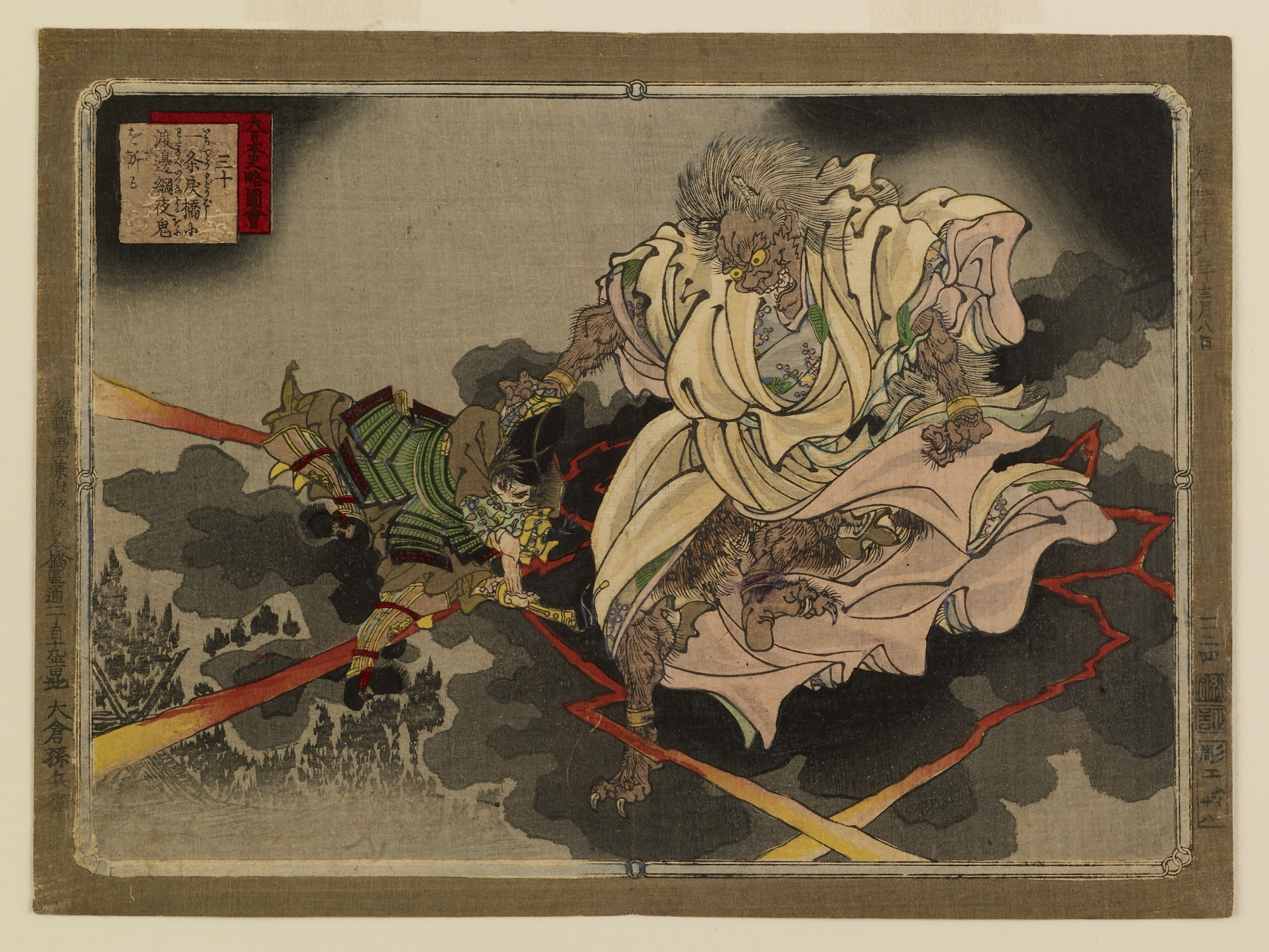
Okura Sonbei, 1885, from Pictorial Outline of Japanese History

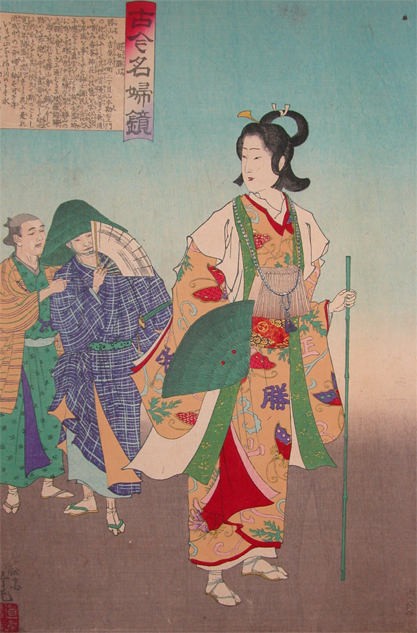
The Prostitute Katsuyama

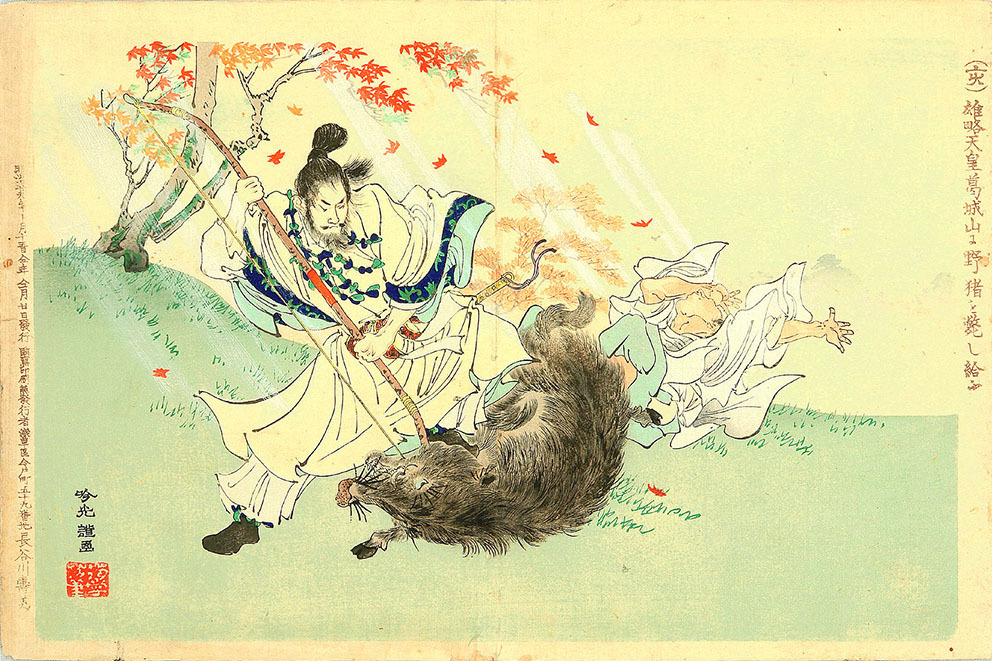
Emperor Yūryaku and a Boar, 1896
