= Adachi Morinaga =

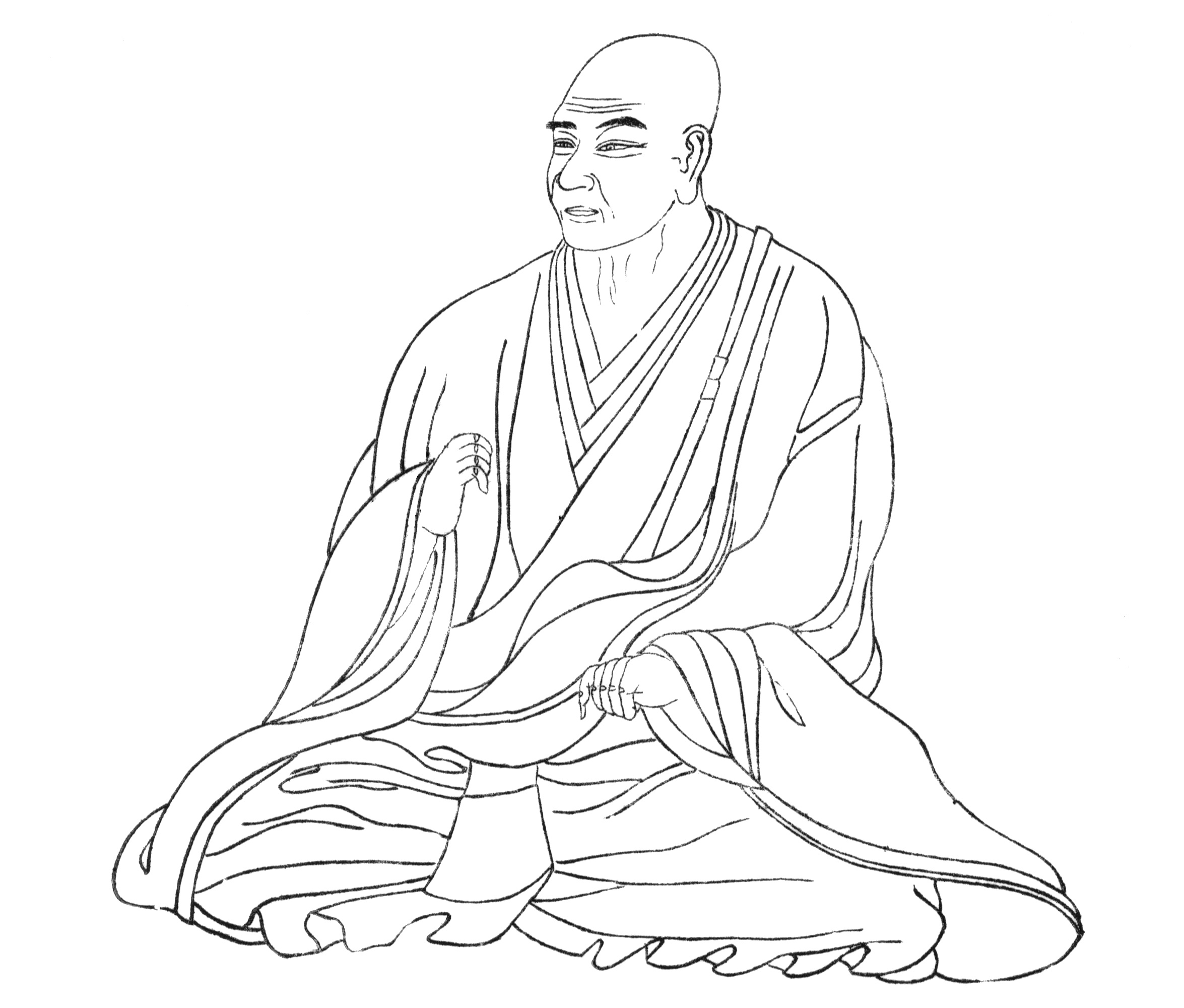
- Portrait of Adachi Morinaga
- Born: 1135
- Died: 1200 (aged 64–65)
- Occupation: Warrior
- Known for: Fought for Minamoto no Yoritomo against the Taira
- Children: Adachi Kagemori

Adachi Morinaga (安達 盛長) (1135–1200) was a Japanese warrior from the Adachi clan who fought for Minamoto no Yoritomo against the Taira. Morinaga had already supported Yoritomo while he lived in exile in Izu Province. In 1180, he was sent by Yoritomo to offers prayers at Mishima Shrine on Yoritomo's behalf.

After the wars, he became a monk and took the name Rensai (蓮西).
