= Yoshida, Shizuoka =

Yoshida 吉田町
- Town
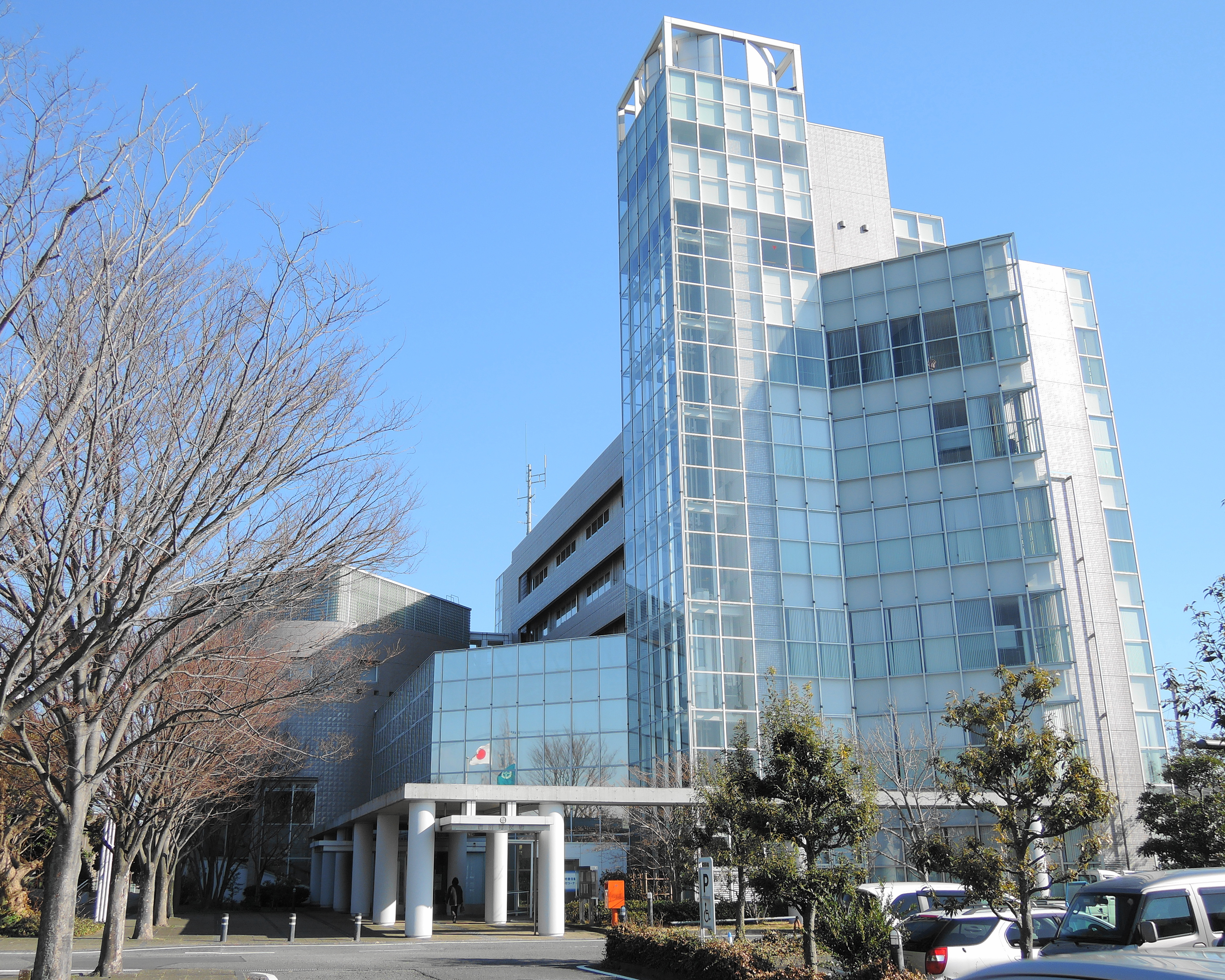
- Yoshida Town hall

- Flag Seal

- Location of Yoshida in Shizuoka Prefecture

- Coordinates: 34°46′N 138°15′E
- Country: Japan
- Region: Chūbu; Tōkai
- Prefecture: Shizuoka
- District: Haibara

Area
  - Total: 20.73 km^{2} (8.00 sq mi)

Population (July 2019)
  - Total: 29,593
  - Density: 1,428/km^{2} (3,697/sq mi)
- Time zone: UTC+9 (Japan Standard Time)
- Tree: Pine
- Flower: Chrysanthemum
- Phone number: 548-33-1111
- Address: 87 Sumiyoshi, Yoshida-chō, Haibara-gun, Shizuoka-ken 421-0395
- Website: Official website

Yoshida (吉田町, Yoshida-chō) is a town located in Haibara District, southern Shizuoka Prefecture, Japan. As of 1 August 2019, the town had an estimated population of 29,593 in 11,359 households, and a population density of 1400 persons per km^{2}. The total area of the town is 20.73 square kilometres (8.00 sq mi).

== Geography ==
Yoshida is located on the coastal plains of southwest Shizuoka Prefecture, facing Suruga Bay on the Pacific Ocean. The Ōi River passes to the west of town. Warmed by the Kuroshio Current, the area enjoys a temperate maritime climate with hot, humid summers and mild, cool winters.

=== Surrounding municipalities ===
Shizuoka Prefecture

- Makinohara
- Shimada
- Yaizu

== Demographics ==
Per Japanese census data, the population of Yoshida has been increasing over the past 50 years.

Historical population
Year	Pop.	±%
1940	14,303	—
1950	17,962	+25.6%
1960	18,171	+1.2%
1970	19,241	+5.9%
1980	21,474	+11.6%
1990	25,147	+17.1%
2000	27,492	+9.3%
2010	28,816	+4.8%

=== Climate ===
The city has a climate characterized by hot and humid summers, and relatively mild winters (Köppen climate classification Cfa). The average annual temperature in Yoshida is 16.4 °C. The average annual rainfall is 2151 mm with September as the wettest month. The temperatures are highest on average in August, at around 27.1 °C, and lowest in January, at around 6.3 °C.

== History ==
Located in former Tōtōmi Province, Yokosuka was a castle town in the Sengoku period, with Koyama castle built by the Takeda clan in 1568. The castle was destroyed by Tokugawa Ieyasu in 1582 and never rebuilt, although the town continued to prosper during the Edo period as a regional commercial center due to its proximity to the Tōkaidō highway connecting Edo with Kyoto. With the establishment of the modern municipalities system in the early Meiji period in 1889, the area was reorganized into Yoshida Village from the merger of six pre-Meiji hamlets. It was elevated to town status on April 1, 1889.

== Economy ==
Yoshida has a mixed economy based on agriculture, commercial fishing and light industry. Local specialities include eel, melons and iceberg lettuce. Several industries are located along the Tōmei Expressway, which passes through the town. These include Fujifilm, AGC Technologies, Sony and Kurita Kogyo.

== Education ==
Yoshida has three public elementary schools and one public junior high school operated by the town government and one public high school operated by the Shizuoka Prefectural Board of Education. The town also has a private high school. The prefecture also operates one special education school for the handicapped.

== Transportation ==
=== Railway ===
Yoshida has no passenger railway service. The nearest railway station is Shimada; busses connected Yoshida with this station.

=== Highway ===
- Tōmei Expressway
- National Route 150

== Sister cities ==
Yoshida had formerly established sister city relations with other cities of the same name around Japan. All of these cities have now been merged into other cities and no longer exist as independent municipalities.

- Yoshida (Saitama Prefecture), became a sister city in 1995 (now the city of Chichibu)
- Yoshida (Niigata Prefecture), became a sister city in 1995 (now the city of Tsubame)
- Yoshida (Hiroshima Prefecture), became a sister city in 1995 (now the city of Akitakata)
- Yoshida (Ehime Prefecture), became a sister city in 1995 (now the city of Uwajima)
- Yoshida (Kagoshima Prefecture), became a sister city in 1995 (now the city of Kagoshima)
