= Chichibu (disambiguation) =

Chichibu (秩父) may refer to:

- A region name that mostly corresponds to the combined areas of Chichibu City and Chichibu District in Saitama, Japan:
  - Chichibu, Saitama, a city
  - Chichibu District, Saitama
- Prince Chichibu, a member of the Japanese imperial family
  - Chichibunomiya Rugby Stadium, a stadium in Tokyo named after Prince Chichibu
