= Buko (disambiguation) =

Buko is a village and former municipality in the district of Wittenberg, Germany.

Buko may also refer to:

== People ==
- Bukō Shimizu (1913–1995), Japanese photographer
- David Buko, Papua New Guinean rugby league player
- Andrzej Buko (born 1947), Polish medieval archaeologist

== Food ==
- "Buko" is the Philippine English term for young green coconut

- Buko juice, coconut water from young green coconuts in Philippine English
- Buko pie, a traditional Filipino baked young-coconut custard pie
- Buko salad, a Filipino salad desert made with young coconut and milk or cream and various other ingredients

== Other ==
- Buko (cleaver), a traditional parang (knife) that originates from Borneo
- BuKo, Philippine TV channel
- Mount Bukō, a mountain in Japan
- Toda-ha Bukō-ryū, a Japanese koryū martial art
- BUKO Pharma-Kampagne, a watchdog for German pharmaceutical companies
- Buko (film), a 2022 Czech film
