= Ogano =

Ogano 小鹿野町
- Town
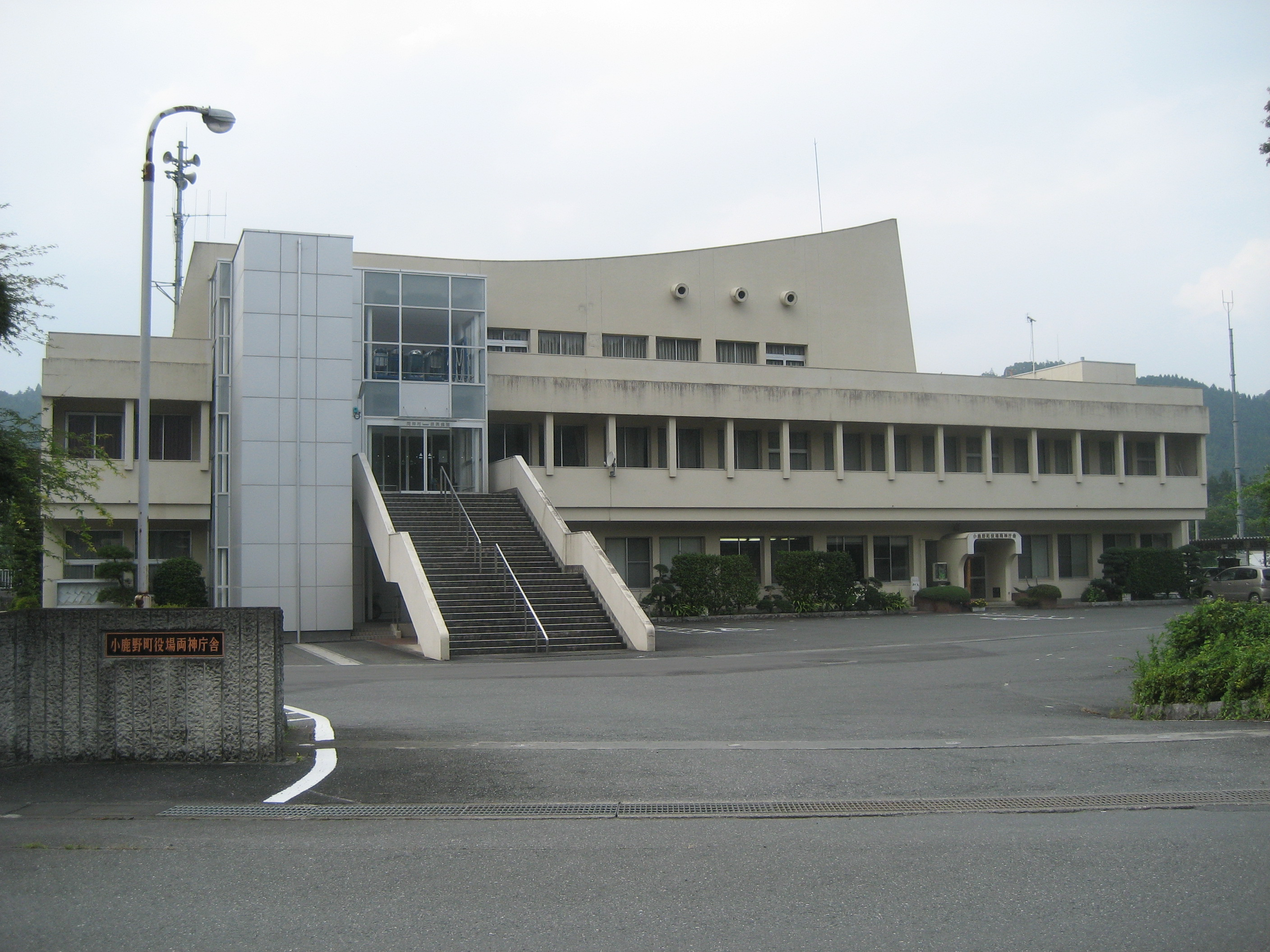
- Ogano town office

- Flag Seal

- Location of Ogano in Saitama Prefecture

- Coordinates: 36°1′1.6″N 139°0′30.9″E
- Country: Japan
- Region: Kantō
- Prefecture: Saitama
- District: Chichibu

Area
  - Total: 171.26 km^{2} (66.12 sq mi)

Population (February 2021)
  - Total: 11,192
  - Density: 65.351/km^{2} (169.26/sq mi)
- Time zone: UTC+9 (Japan Standard Time)
- Tree: Acer
- Flower: Shibateranthis pinnatifida
- Bird: Japanese bush warbler
- Phone number: 0494-75-1221
- Address: Ogano 89, Ogano-cho, Chichibu-gun, Saitama-ken 368-0192
- Website: Official website

Ogano (小鹿野町, Ogano-machi) is a town located in Saitama Prefecture, Japan. As of 1 January 2021, the town had an estimated population of 11,192 in 4657 households and a population density of 65 persons per km^{2}. The total area of the town is 171.26 square kilometres (66.12 sq mi). Parts of the town are within the borders of the Chichibu Tama Kai National Park.

== Geography ==
Ogano is located in the mountainous far western Saitama Prefecture, surrounded by the city of Chichibu on the north, east and south and by Gunma Prefecture to the west.

=== Surrounding municipalities ===
Gunma Prefecture

- Kanna
- Ueno

Saitama Prefecture

- Chichibu

=== Climate ===
Ogano has an oceanic climate (Köppen Cfb) characterized by warm summers and cool winters with light snowfall. The average annual temperature in Ogano is 10.4 °C. The average annual rainfall is 2222 mm with September as the wettest month. The temperatures are highest on average in August, at around 21.9 °C, and lowest in January, at around minus 1.2 °C.

== Demographics ==
Per Japanese census data, the population of Ogose has declined at an accelerating rate in recent decades.

Historical population
Year	Pop.	±%
1920	18,256	—
1930	18,625	+2.0%
1940	17,777	−4.6%
1950	20,282	+14.1%
1960	18,723	−7.7%
1970	16,477	−12.0%
1980	16,190	−1.7%
1990	15,919	−1.7%
2000	15,061	−5.4%
2010	13,436	−10.8%
2020	10,928	−18.7%

== History ==
The town of Ogano was created within Chichibu District, Saitama with the establishment of the modern municipalities system on April 1, 1889, and annexed the neighboring village of Nagawaka on April 1, 1955, followed by the villages of Mitagawa and Kurao on March 31, 1956. On October 1, 2005, the village of Ryōkami was merged into Ogano.

== Government ==
Ogano has a mayor-council form of government with a directly elected mayor and a unicameral town council of 12 members. Ogano, together with the towns of Higashichichibu, Minano, Nagatoro and Yokoze, contributes one member to the Saitama Prefectural Assembly. In terms of national politics, the town is part of Saitama 11th district of the lower house of the Diet of Japan.

== Economy ==
Ogano is largely a bedroom community due to its proximity to the city of Chichibu.

== Education ==
Ogano has four public elementary schools and one public middle school operated by the town government, and one public high school operated by the Saitama Prefectural Board of Education.

== Transportation ==
=== Railway ===
Ogano has no passenger rail service. The nearest station is Chichibu Station, in the neighboring city of Chichibu.

=== Highway ===
- National Route 299

== Local attractions ==
- Chichibu 34 Kannon Sanctuary
- Chichibu Muse Park
- Mount Ryōkami (one of the 100 Famous Japanese Mountains)
- Ogano Kabuki Theater
