= Streptomyces blastmyceticus =

Scientific classification
- Domain: Bacteria
- Kingdom: Bacillati
- Phylum: Actinomycetota
- Class: Actinomycetes
- Order: Streptomycetales
- Family: Streptomycetaceae
- Genus: Streptomyces
- Species: S. blastmyceticus

Binomial name
- Streptomyces blastmyceticus Witt and Stackebrandt 1991

Type strain
- 455 D1, 68, AS 4.1647, ATCC 19731, BCRC 13387, CBS 470, CBS 470.68, CCRC 13387, CECT 3257, CEST 3257, CGMCC 4.1647, CIP 108151, DSM 40029, DSMZ 40029, ETH 31571, IFO 12747, IPV 1994, ISP 5029, JCM 4184, JCM 4565, KCC S-0184, KCC S-0565, KCCS-0184, KCTC 9886, NBRC 12747, NCB 77, NCIB 9800, NCIMB 9800, NRRL B-5480, NRRL-ISP 5029, RIA 1012, RIA 1625, VKM Ac-766, Yonehara 455D1

Synonyms
- Streptoverticillium blastmyceticum (Watanabe et al. 1957) Locci et al. 1969 (Approved Lists 1980); "Streptomyces blastmyceticus" Watanabe et al. 1957

Species of bacterium

Streptomyces blastmyceticus is a bacterium species from the genus of Streptomyces which has been isolated from soil in the Chichibu District in Japan. Streptomyces blastmyceticus produces blastmycin.

== See also ==
- List of Streptomyces species
