= Musashi Province =

Former province of Japan

Map of Japanese provinces with province highlighted

Musashi Province (武蔵国, Musashi no Kuni; Japanese pronunciation: [mɯ̈́.sä̀.ɕì (nò̞ kɯ̈̀.ɲ̟ì)]) was a province of Japan, which today comprises Tokyo Metropolis, most of Saitama Prefecture and part of Kanagawa Prefecture. It was sometimes called Bushū (武州). The province encompassed Kawasaki and Yokohama. Musashi bordered on Kai, Kōzuke, Sagami, Shimōsa, and Shimotsuke Provinces.

Musashi was the largest province in the Kantō region.

== History ==
Musashi had its ancient capital in modern Fuchū, Tokyo, and its provincial temple in what is now Kokubunji, Tokyo. By the Sengoku period, the main city was Edo, which became the dominant city of eastern Japan. Edo Castle was the headquarters of Tokugawa Ieyasu before the Battle of Sekigahara and became the dominant city of Japan during the Edo period, being renamed Tokyo during the Meiji Restoration.

Hikawa-jinja was designated as the chief Shinto shrine (ichinomiya) of the province; and there are many branch shrines.

The former province gave its name to the battleship Musashi of the Second World War.

=== Timeline of important events ===
- 534 (Ankan 1, 12th month): The Yamato court sends a military force to appoint Omi as the governor of Musashi Province, his rival, Wogi was executed by the court. Omi presented four districts of Musashi Province to the court as royal estates.
- July 18, 707 (Keiun 4, 15th day of the 6th month): Empress Genmei is enthroned at the age of 48.

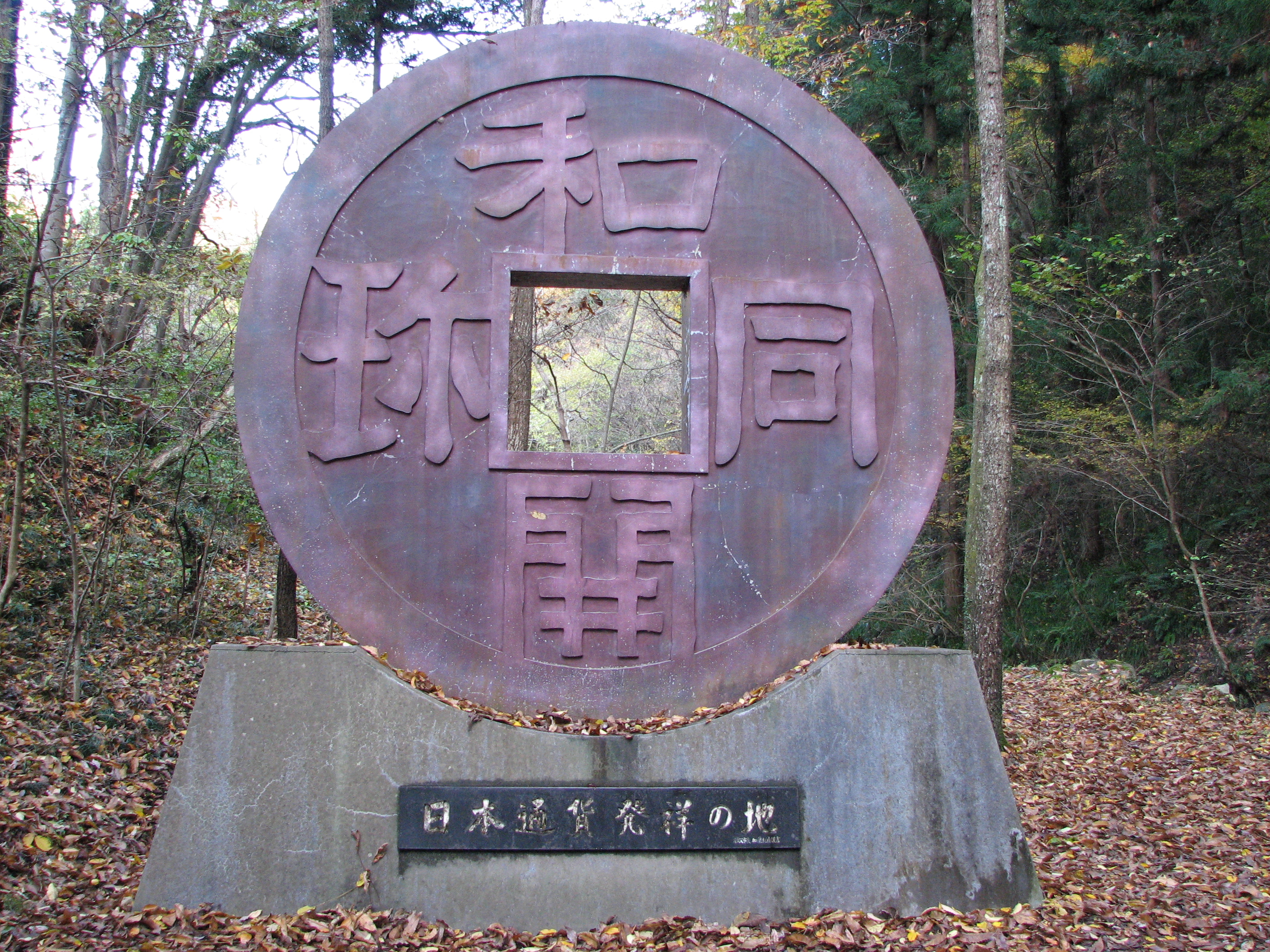
Wadōkaichin monument in Saitama

- 707 (Keiun 4): Copper was reported to have been found in Musashi province in the region which includes modern day Tokyo.
- 708 (Keiun 5): The era name was about to be changed to mark the accession of Empress Genmei; but the choice of Wadō as the new nengō for this new reign became a way to mark the welcome discovery of copper in the Chichibu District of what is now Saitama Prefecture. The Japanese word for copper is dō (銅); and since this was indigenous copper, the "wa" (the ancient Chinese term for Japan) could be combined with the "dō" (copper) to create a new composite term—"wadō"—meaning "Japanese copper".
- May 5, 708 (Wadō 1, 11th day of the 4th month): A sample of the newly discovered Musashi copper was presented in Genmei's Court where it was formally acknowledged as Japanese copper. The Wadō era is famous for the first Japanese coin (和同開珎; wadokaiho or wadokaichin).
- 1590 (Tenshō 18): Siege of Odawara. Iwatsuki Domain and Oshi Domain founded in Musashi Province.

== Historical districts ==
Musashi Province had 21 districts and then added one later.

- Saitama Prefecture
  - Chichibu District (秩父郡)
  - Hanzawa District (榛沢郡) – merged into Ōsato District (along with Hatara and Obusama Districts) on March 29, 1896
  - Hatara District (幡羅郡) – merged into Ōsato District (along with Hanzawa and Obusama Districts) on March 29, 1896
  - Hiki District (比企郡) – absorbed Yokomi District on March 29, 1896
  - Iruma District (入間郡) – merged into Koma District on March 29, 1896
  - Kami District (賀美郡, 加美郡) – merged into Kodama District (along with Naka District) on March 29, 1896
  - Kodama District (児玉郡) – absorbed Kami and Naka Districts on March 29, 1896
  - Koma District (高麗郡) – merged into Iruma District on March 29, 1896
  - Naka District (那珂郡) – merged into Kodama District (along with Kami District) on March 29, 1896
  - Niikura District (新座郡, 新倉郡, 新羅郡) – merged into Kitaadachi District on March 29, 1896
  - Obusuma District (男衾郡) – merged into Ōsato District (along with Hanzawa and Hatara Districts) on March 29, 1896
  - Ōsato District (大里郡) – absorbed Hanzawa, Hatara and Obusama Districts on March 29, 1896
  - Saitama District (埼玉郡)
    - Kitasaitama District (埼玉郡) – dissolved
    - Minamisaitama District (埼玉郡)
  - Yokomi District (横見郡) – merged into Hiki District on March 29, 1896
- Tokyo Metropolis (-to) (until 1943: Tokyo Prefecture (-fu))
  - Ebara District (荏原郡) – merged into Tokyo (City/-shi) in 1932
  - Toshima District (豊嶋郡)
    - Kitatoshima District (北豊島郡) – merged into Tokyo City in 1932
    - Minamitoshima District (南豊島郡) – merged with Higashitama District to become Toyotama District on April 1, 1896, merged into Tokyo City in 1932
- Kanagawa Prefecture
  - Kuraki District (久良岐郡) – dissolved
  - Tachibana District (橘樹郡) – dissolved
  - Tsuzuki District (都筑郡) – dissolved
- Mixed
  - Adachi District (足立郡)
    - Kitaadachi District (Saitama) (北足立郡) – absorbed Niikura District on March 29, 1896
    - Minamiadachi District (Tokyo) (南足立郡) – merged into Tokyo City on October 1, 1932
  - Katsushika District (葛飾郡) – Transfer from Shimōsa Province in 1683 (some say 1622–1643) for the river improvement of Naka River.
    - Kitakatsushika District (Saitama) (北葛飾郡) – absorbed Nakakatsushika District (Shimōsa, Saitama) on March 29, 1896
    - Minamikatsushika District (Tokyo) (南葛飾郡) – merged into the Tokyo City on October 1, 1932
  - Tama District (多摩郡, 多麻郡, 多磨郡)
    - Higashitama District (東多摩郡, Higashi-Tama-gun, "East Tama District") – part of Tokyo since its creation, merged with Minamitoshima District to become Toyotama District (豊多摩郡) on April 1, 1896, in turn merged into Tokyo City in 1932
    - Kitatama District (北多摩郡, Kita-Tama-gun, "North Tama District") – was part of Kanagawa in 1878 until being transferred to Tokyo in 1893; North Tama's last towns became [by definition: district-independent] cities in 1970
    - Minamitama District (南多摩郡, Minami-Tama-gun, "South Tama District") – was part of Kanagawa in 1878 until being transferred to Tokyo in 1893; South Tama's last towns were turned into cities in 1971
    - Nishitama District (西多摩郡, Nishi-Tama-gun, "West Tama District") – was part of Kanagawa in 1878 until being transferred to Tokyo in 1893

== See also ==
- Chichibu Province
- Miyamoto Musashi
- City of Musashino
- Musashino Terrace
- Musashi Kokufu
- Japanese battleship Musashi
