= Bukō Shimizu =

Japanese photographer

Bukō Shimizu (清水 武甲, Shimizu Bukō; 1913–1995) was a Japanese photographer who lived in and photographed Chichibu (Saitama).

Shimizu was born on 12 October 1913 in Chichibu, the eldest son of the family running a photography studio in Kumaki, Chichibu. His unusual given name, Bukō, is written with the same characters as those used for Mount Bukō; the family had intended it to be pronounced Takekatsu, but when interviewed in his late seventies Shimizu did not remember "Takekatsu" as having been used. In 1929, Shimizu's father suddenly gave up working at the family's photography studio in Chichibu, and the 16-year-old Bukō had to teach himself photographic technique (even the manufacture of photographic paper) from books bought second hand in order to keep the business running From around 1937 he also energetically photographed the topography and people of Chichibu.

Shimizu provided the photographs for a large number of books about the Chichibu area. In 1972 he won the annual award of the Photographic Society of Japan.

Shimizu also wrote much about Chichibu; a three-volume collection of his writings was published in 1983. He worked on behalf of the area's libraries and drama, and towards creation of Chichibu National Park.

Shimizu died on 23 January 1995.

Photographs by Shimizu are in the permanent collection of the Tokyo Metropolitan Museum of Photography.

== Books by Shimizu ==
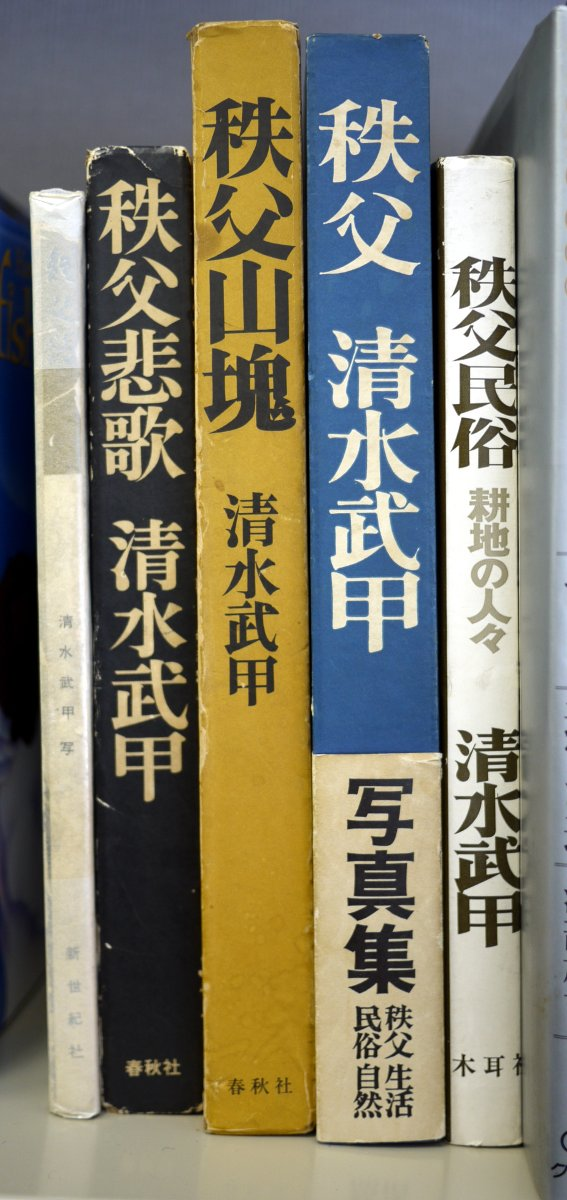
Some photobooks by Bukō Shimizu

- Chichibu no kao hyakunin (秩父の顔百人). Chichibu: Chichibu no kao hyakunin-shū Dōjinsha, 1954.
- Chichibu-ji (秩父路). Tokyo: Shinseiki-sha, 1958.
- Oku-Chichibu: Yamatabi to fūdo (奥秩父 山旅と風土). Yamakei Bunko. Tokyo: Yamato Keikoku-sha, 1962. With Seiichirō Asami (浅見清一郎).
- Chichibu gensōkō: Kannon reijō, sono kokoro to fūdo (秩父幻想行 観音霊場、そのこころと風土). Tokyo: Mokujisha, 1968.
- Chichibu: Shimizu Bukō sakuhinshū (秩父 清水武甲作品集). Tokyo: Mokujisha, 1969.
- Chichibu hika: Chichibu jiken no kokoro to fūdo (秩父悲歌 秩父事件の心と風土). Tokyo: Shinjūsha, 1971.
- Chichibu minzoku: Kōchi no hitobito (秩父民俗 耕地の人々). Tokyo: Mokujisha, 1971.
- Chichibu: Furusato no kokoro (秩父 ふるさとの心). 2nd ed. Tokyo: Mokujisha, 1972.
- Chichibu sankei (秩父山塊). Tokyo: Shinjūsha, 1974.
- Chichibu jōdo: Chichibu kannon reijō shashinshū (秩父浄土 秩父観音霊場写真集). Tokyo: Shinjūsha, 1976.
- Bukō-zan (武甲山). Tokyo: Mokujisha, 1976.
- Chichibu senchū no kiroku (秩父戦中の記録). Tokyo: Mokujisha, 1977.
- Mitsumine-san: Shashinshū (三峰山 写真集). Tokyo: Mokujisha, 1978.
- Chichibu matsuri (秩父祭). Chichibu: Chichibu Matsuri Hozon Iinkai, 1979. With Hisashi Chishima (千嶋寿). Expanded edition. Tokyo: Gensōsha, 1984.
- Ningen Chichibu: Kage to hida no naka ni (にんげん秩父 蔭と襞の中に). Tokyo: Shinjūsha, 1980.
- Chichibu (秩父). Furusato no omoide: Shashinshū Meiji–Taishō–Shōwa. Tokyo: Kokusho Kankō-kai, 1983. Edited by Shimizu and Hisashi Chishima.
- Chichibu: Shimizu Bukō-shū (秩父 清水武甲文集). 3 vols. Tokyo: Gensōsha, 1983. Writing by Shimizu.
  - 1. Fūdokō (風土考).
  - 2. Yama to seikatsu (山と生活).
  - 3. Shashin saijiki (写真歳時記).
- Chichibu bandō kannon reijō (秩父坂東観音霊場). Shin-jinbutsu-ōrai-sha, 1984. ISBN 4-404-01236-5.
- Chichibu-gaku nyūmon: Waga-ai suru fūdo e (秩父学入門 わが愛する風土へ). Sakitama Sōsho. Urawa: Sakitama Shuppankai, 1984. ISBN 4-87891-027-5. Edited by Shimizu.
- Chichibu-ji 50-nen (秩父路50年). Tonbo no Hon. Tokyo: Shinchōsha, 1986. ISBN 4-10-601933-7. With Hisashi Chishima.
- Chichibu jinja (秩父神社). Sakitama Bunko 2. Urawa: Sakitama Shuppankai, 1989. ISBN 4-87891-202-2. Text by Hisashi Chishima.
- Shimizu Bukō sensei kenshō-hi shunkō kinenshi (清水武甲先生顕彰碑竣工記念誌). Chichibu: Shimizu Bukō sensei kenshō-kai, 1998.
