= Ōtaki, Saitama =

Dissolved municipality in Saitama prefecture, Japan

Ōtaki (大滝村, Ōtaki-mura) was a village located in Chichibu District, Saitama Prefecture, Japan.

As of 2003, the village had an estimated population of 1,499 and a density of 4.53 persons per km^{2}. The total area was 330.98 km^{2}.

On April 1, 2005, Ōtaki, along with the town of Yoshida, and the village of Arakawa (all from Chichibu District), was merged into the expanded city of Chichibu and no longer exists as an independent municipality.
