= Chichibu =

Chichibu 秩父市
- City
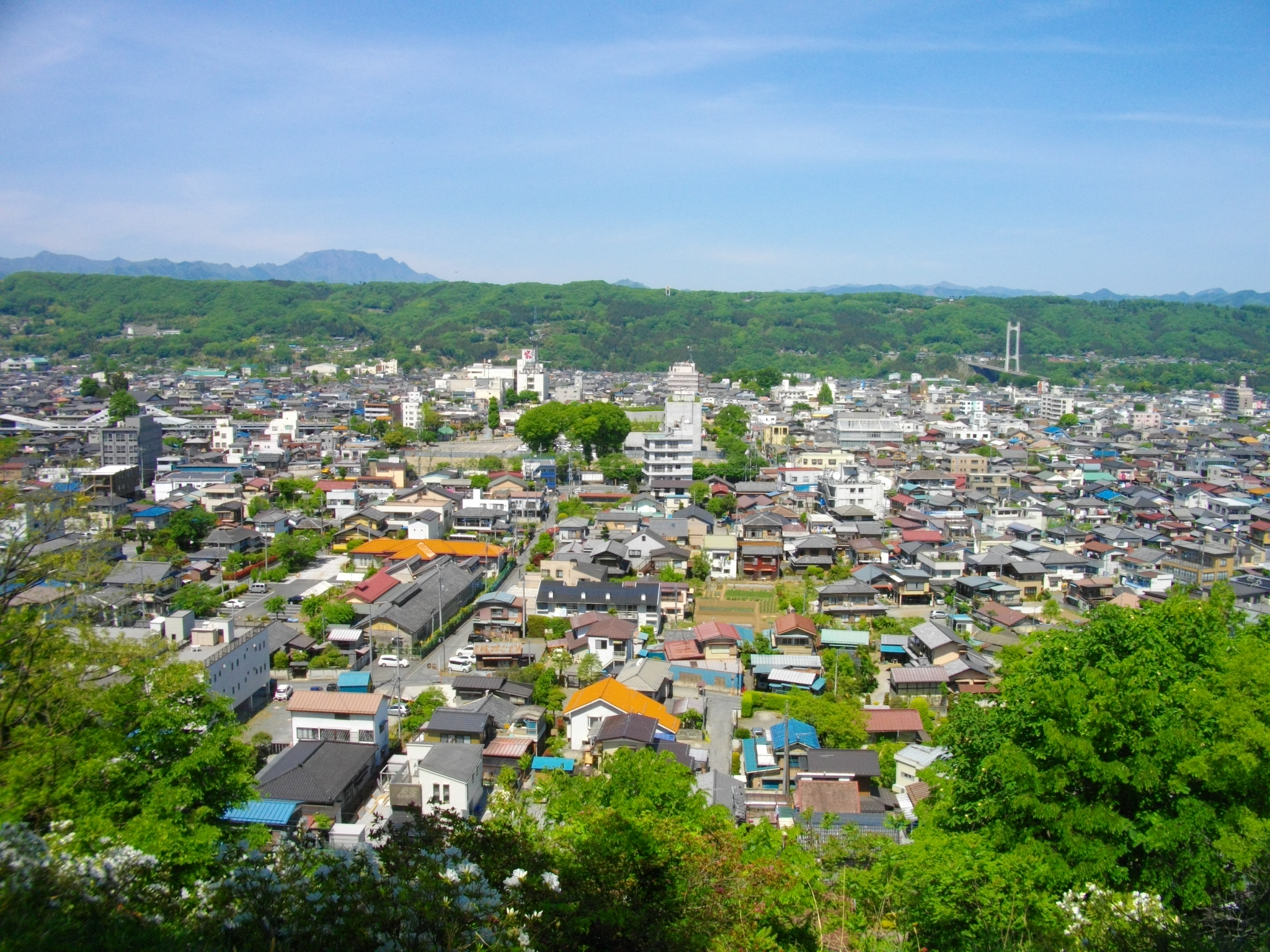
- View of central Chichibu, from Hitsujiyama Park

- Flag Seal

- Location of Chichibu in Saitama Prefecture

- Location within Japan Location within Kanto Area Location within Saitama Prefecture
- Coordinates: 35°59′30.4″N 139°5′7.7″E
- Country: Japan
- Region: Kantō
- Prefecture: Saitama
- First official recorded: 88 BC (official)
- City established: April 1, 1950

Government
  - Mayor: Kazuhiko Kiyono (since May 2025)

Area
  - Total: 577.83 km^{2} (223.10 sq mi)

Population (January 1, 2021)
  - Total: 61,159
  - Density: 105.84/km^{2} (274.13/sq mi)
- Time zone: UTC+9 (Japan Standard Time)
- Phone number: 0494-22-2211
- Address: 8-15 Kumaki, Chichibu, Saitama 368-8686
- Climate: Cfa
- Website: Official website
- Symbols
- Bird: Blue-and-white flycatcher
- Flower: Shiba-zakura
- Tree: Kaede

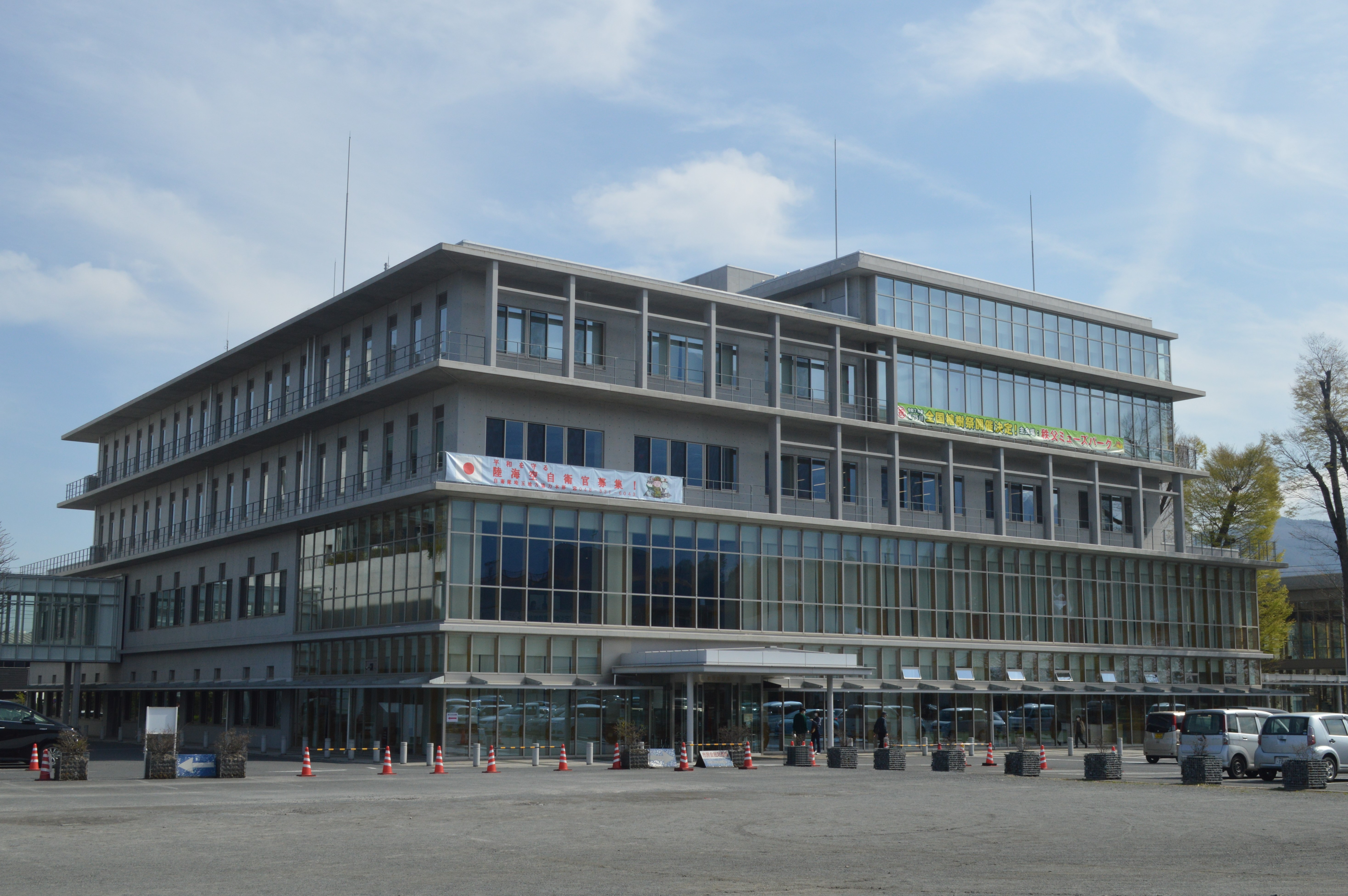
Chichibu City Hall

Chichibu (Japanese: 秩父市, Hepburn: Chichibu-shi) is a city located in Saitama Prefecture, Japan. As of 1 January 2021, the city had an estimated population of 61,159 in 26,380 households and a population density of 110 inhabitants per square kilometre (280/sq mi). The total area of the city is 577.83 square kilometres (223.10 sq mi).

== Geography ==
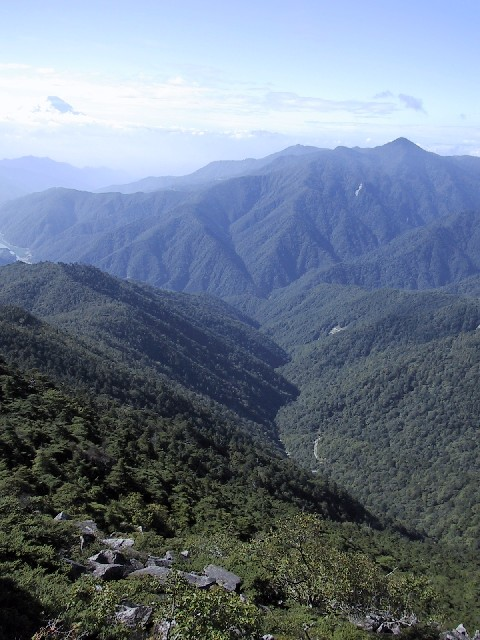
Oku-Chichibu ("Further Chichibu") Mountains

Chichibu is in the westernmost part of Saitama. Unlike other parts of the prefecture, it is largely mountainous and the population is concentrated in river terraces along the Arakawa River. It is Saitama's largest municipality in terms of surface area and shares borders with Tokyo, Yamanashi, Nagano and Gunma Prefectures. A large portion of the city belongs to Chichibu Tama Kai National Park.

Because the region is not suitable for growing rice, many people have traditionally depended on sericulture (silk farming). Limestone from Mount Bukō, which rises south of the city center, is another major source of income for the region. The city is shifting its focus toward sightseeing, taking advantage of its rich natural environment and relative closeness to the Tokyo metropolitan area. The city is also famous for its brewing industry.

=== Surrounding municipalities ===
Gunma Prefecture

- Fujioka
- Kanna
- Ueno

Nagano Prefecture

- Kawakami

Saitama Prefecture

- Hannō
- Higashichichibu
- Kamikawa
- Minano
- Ogano
- Tokigawa
- Yokoze

Tokyo Metropolis

- Okutama

Yamanashi Prefecture

- Kōshū
- Tabayama
- Yamanashi

=== Climate ===
Chichibu has a humid subtropical climate (Köppen Cfa) characterized by warm summers and cool winters with light to no snowfall. The average annual temperature in Chichibu is 13.2 °C. The average annual rainfall is 1325 mm with September as the wettest month. The temperatures are highest on average in August, at around 25.8 °C, and lowest in January, at around 6.0 °C.

Climate data for Chichibu (1991−2020 normals, extremes 1926−present)
Month	Jan	Feb	Mar	Apr	May	Jun	Jul	Aug	Sep	Oct	Nov	Dec	Year
Record high °C (°F)	23.0 (73.4)	26.6 (79.9)	27.6 (81.7)	33.0 (91.4)	37.2 (99.0)	38.4 (101.1)	39.2 (102.6)	40.0 (104.0)	38.0 (100.4)	32.4 (90.3)	26.5 (79.7)	25.1 (77.2)	40.0 (104.0)
Mean maximum °C (°F)	15.3 (59.5)	19.0 (66.2)	22.2 (72.0)	27.7 (81.9)	31.5 (88.7)	33.1 (91.6)	36.4 (97.5)	36.7 (98.1)	33.6 (92.5)	28.1 (82.6)	22.3 (72.1)	17.7 (63.9)	37.5 (99.5)
Mean daily maximum °C (°F)	8.9 (48.0)	10.0 (50.0)	13.5 (56.3)	19.1 (66.4)	23.8 (74.8)	26.0 (78.8)	29.8 (85.6)	31.0 (87.8)	26.4 (79.5)	20.8 (69.4)	15.9 (60.6)	11.2 (52.2)	19.7 (67.5)
Daily mean °C (°F)	1.8 (35.2)	3.0 (37.4)	6.6 (43.9)	12.2 (54.0)	17.3 (63.1)	20.8 (69.4)	24.6 (76.3)	25.5 (77.9)	21.5 (70.7)	15.5 (59.9)	9.2 (48.6)	4.0 (39.2)	13.5 (56.3)
Mean daily minimum °C (°F)	−3.8 (25.2)	−2.9 (26.8)	0.7 (33.3)	5.9 (42.6)	11.5 (52.7)	16.5 (61.7)	20.6 (69.1)	21.5 (70.7)	17.7 (63.9)	11.3 (52.3)	4.0 (39.2)	−1.6 (29.1)	8.5 (47.2)
Mean minimum °C (°F)	−7.6 (18.3)	−7.3 (18.9)	−4.8 (23.4)	−1.1 (30.0)	4.8 (40.6)	10.7 (51.3)	17.1 (62.8)	17.7 (63.9)	11.3 (52.3)	4.3 (39.7)	−1.8 (28.8)	−5.9 (21.4)	−8.0 (17.6)
Record low °C (°F)	−15.8 (3.6)	−14.4 (6.1)	−12.5 (9.5)	−5.4 (22.3)	−0.9 (30.4)	4.4 (39.9)	9.1 (48.4)	10.8 (51.4)	6.1 (43.0)	−0.9 (30.4)	−6.5 (20.3)	−11.7 (10.9)	−15.8 (3.6)
Average precipitation mm (inches)	40.3 (1.59)	30.8 (1.21)	69.0 (2.72)	88.0 (3.46)	102.4 (4.03)	145.4 (5.72)	192.0 (7.56)	188.4 (7.42)	236.7 (9.32)	204.1 (8.04)	47.5 (1.87)	30.7 (1.21)	1,375.3 (54.15)
Average snowfall cm (inches)	15 (5.9)	12 (4.7)	6 (2.4)	1 (0.4)	0 (0)	0 (0)	0 (0)	0 (0)	0 (0)	0 (0)	0 (0)	2 (0.8)	36 (14)
Average precipitation days (≥ 1.0 mm)	3.3	3.8	7.6	7.6	9.1	12.0	13.2	10.6	11.5	8.9	5.2	3.5	96.3
Average snowy days (≥ 3 cm)	2.0	1.6	1.3	0.2	0	0	0	0	0	0	0	0.3	5.4
Average relative humidity (%)	64	62	64	67	71	79	81	80	83	82	79	71	74
Mean monthly sunshine hours	205.5	193.1	189.7	186.3	179.5	123.0	133.4	152.4	113.6	128.7	163.7	192.3	1,968.1
Source: JMA

== Demographics ==
Per Japanese census data, the population of Chichibu has decreased gradually over the past 60 years.

Historical population
Year	Pop.	±%
1950	78,285	—
1960	82,811	+5.8%
1970	78,764	−4.9%
1980	76,875	−2.4%
1990	75,845	−1.3%
2000	73,875	−2.6%
2010	66,955	−9.4%
2020	59,674	−10.9%

== History ==
Japanese archaeologists identified the remains of what may be the world's oldest artificial structure located on a hillside in Chichibu. This discovery offers new perspectives on early architectural practices in Asia. The shelter is believed to have been constructed by Homo erectus, an early human ancestor known for the use of stone tools. According to a report published in New Scientist, the archaeological site has been dated to approximately 500,000 years ago. The structure consists of ten post holes forming two irregular pentagons, suggesting the former existence of two distinct huts. In addition to the ground markings, thirty stone tools were found scattered across the vicinity. Prior to this find, the oldest known remains of a human-made structure were those identified at Terra Amata in France. Those French archaeological remains date back to a period between 200,000 and 400,000 years ago, making the Chichibu discovery significantly older.

Chichibu was incorporated as a city on April 1, 1950, although Chichibu Province had already existed since before the Nara period and the region has developed many local traditions. Chichibu Province was incorporated into Musashi Province in the 7th century AD. During premodern times, the town developed as a marketplace of the district as well as the town around Chichibu Shrine. The city's older name, Ōmiya ("big shrine"), was derived from the shrine. Since its incorporation in 1950, the area of the city has grown through a series of mergers, the most recent in 2005.

=== Timeline ===
- 708: Deposits of copper are discovered in the region and offered to the Imperial Court. The era name Wadō (和銅, meaning "Japanese copper") is proclaimed in recognition of this welcome event in the initial months of Empress Genmei's reign. The copper is used to mint Wadō Kaihō or Wadōkaichin, which are amongst the oldest examples of coinage in Japan.-- see image of Wado Kaichin from Japan Mint Museum
- 1884: The Chichibu incident: uprising of impoverished peasants under the influence of the Freedom and People's Rights Movement. Seven are sentenced to death and over 4,000 people punished.
- 1889: Ōmiya Town was founded within Chichibu District, Saitama with the establishment of the municipalities system
- 1914: The Chichibu Railway opened.
- 1916: Ōmiya Town was renamed Chichibu Town.
- 1950: Chichibu was elevated to city status.
- 1954: Chichibu absorbed the villages of Odamaki, Haraya and Kuna.
- 1957: Chichibu absorbed the villages of Takashino and Ōta.
- 1958: Chichibu absorbed the town of Kagemori.
- 1969: The Seibu Chichibu Line opened.
- 2005: Chichibu absorbed the town of Yoshida, and the villages of Arakawa and Ōtaki (all from Chichibu District).

== Government ==
Chichibu has a mayor-council form of government with a directly elected mayor and a unicameral city council of 22 members. Chichibu contributes one member to the Saitama Prefectural Assembly. In terms of national politics, the city is part of Saitama 11th district of the lower house of the Diet of Japan.

== Economy ==
The local economy of Chichibu remains based on agriculture and forestry, as well as tourism.

== Education ==
Chichibu has 14 public elementary schools and eight public middle schools operated by the city government, and two public high schools operated by the Saitama Prefectural Board of Education. The prefecture also operates two special education schools for the handicapped.

== Transportation ==
=== Railway ===
Two lines serve the city: the Chichibu Main Line and Seibu Chichibu Line. The Chichibu Railway was constructed along the Arakawa River and first opened in 1914. Seibu Railway reached the city in 1969 and considerably reduced the travel time to Tokyo. It takes approximately one and a half hours to travel from Seibu-Chichibu Station to Ikebukuro Station, one of the major train terminals in Tokyo. These lines carry people as well as limestone from Mount Bukō. The two lines were directly connected on April 1, 1989. Chichibu Railway also operated the Mitsumine Ropeway, which carried passengers visiting Mitsumine Shrine. The ropeway was taken out of service since May 19, 2006, and was officially abandoned on December 1, 2007.

Seibu Railway – Seibu Chichibu Line

- Seibu-Chichibu

Chichibu Railway – Chichibu Main Line

- Wadō-Kuroya – Ōnohara – Chichibu – Ohanabatake – Kagemori – Urayamaguchi – Bushū-Nakagawa – Bushū-Hino – Shiroku – Mitsumineguchi

=== Highway ===
Two national roads, Route 140 and 299, serve the city. Route 140 connects the city to its nearest expressway interchange, Hanazono Interchange of the Kan-Etsu Expressway. The city had no road communication to Yamanashi Prefecture due to steep Okuchichibu Mountains, but the opening of the Karisaka Tunnel in 1998 enabled the city to connect to Yamanashi.

- National Route 140
- National Route 299

== Sister cities ==
- (Japan) Toshima, Tokyo, since October 14, 1983
- (Japan) Sanyō-Onoda, Yamaguchi, since May 20, 1996
- Antioch, California, United States, since September 16, 1967
- Gangneung, Gangwon-do, South Korea, since February 16, 1983
- Linfen, Shanxi Province, China, since October 7, 1988
- Warringah, Australia, since April 26, 1996
- Yasothon, Yasothon Province, Thailand, since May 6, 1999

== Local attractions ==
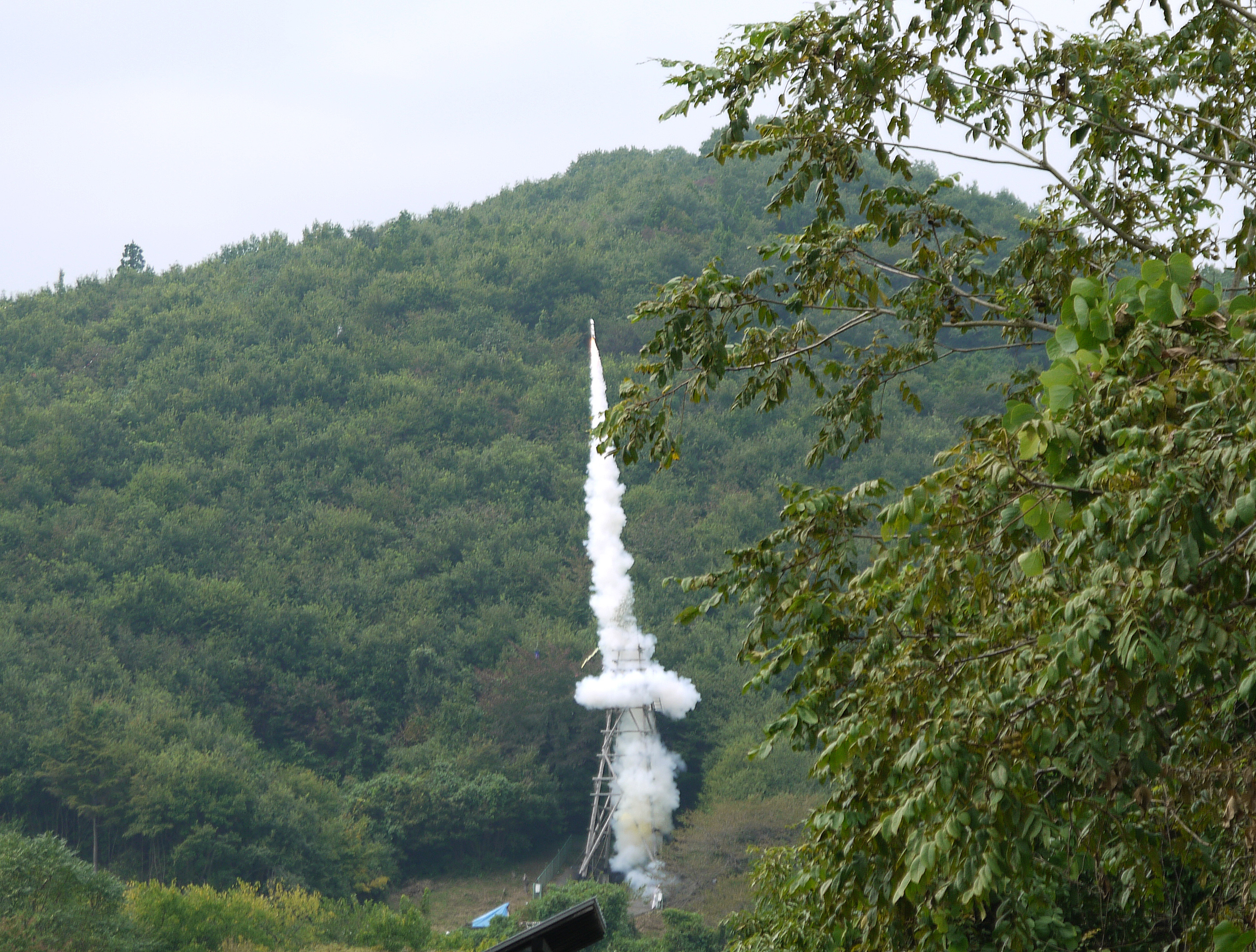
Ryusei festival in Yoshida town

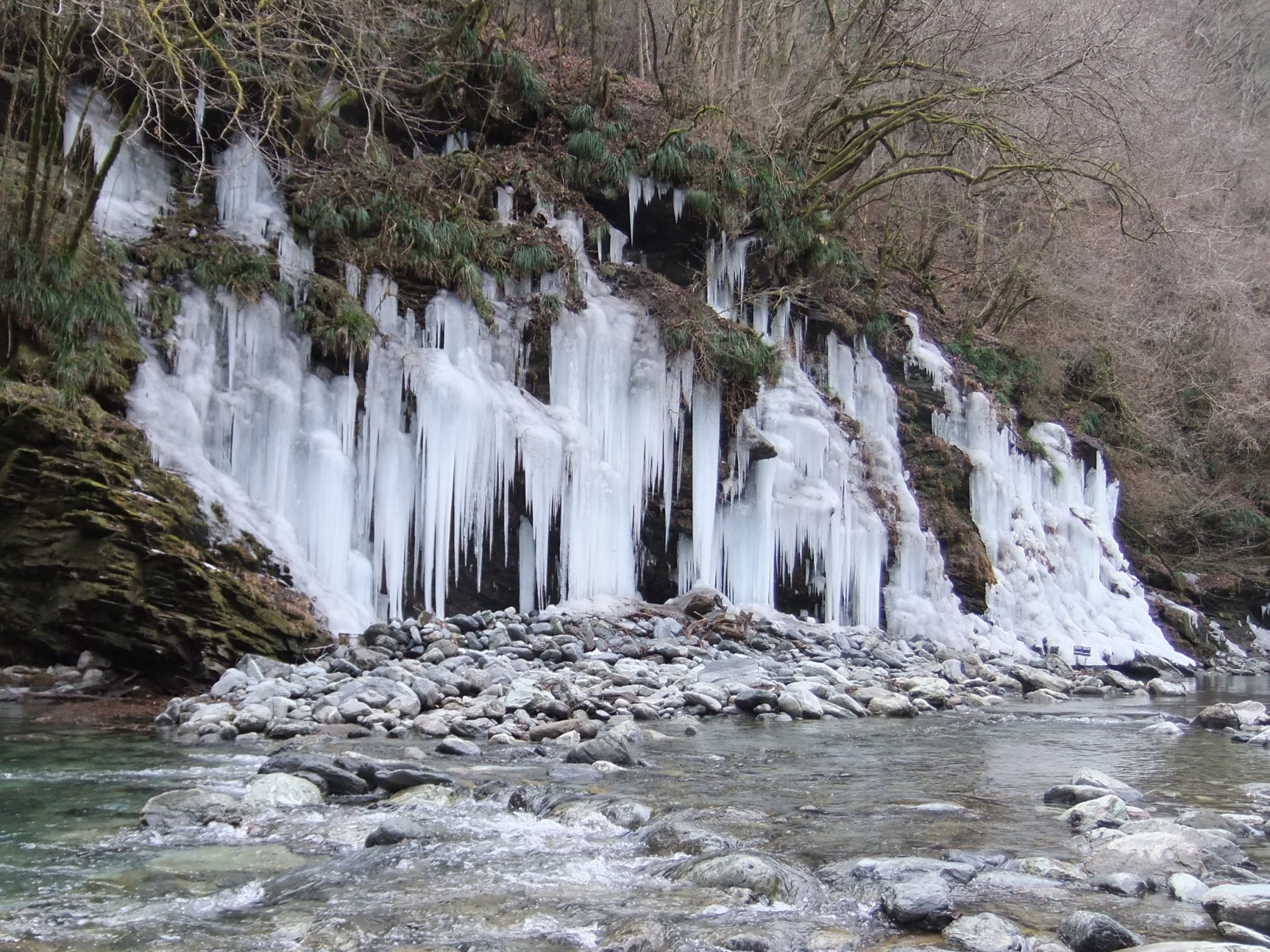
Icicles of the Misotsuchi

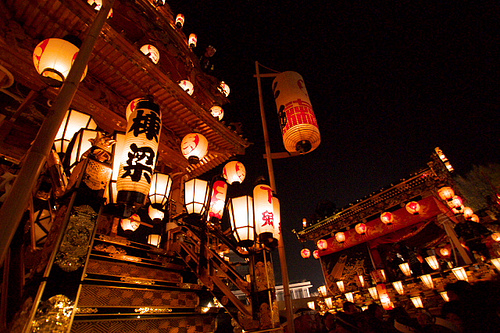
Chichibu Night Traditional Festival

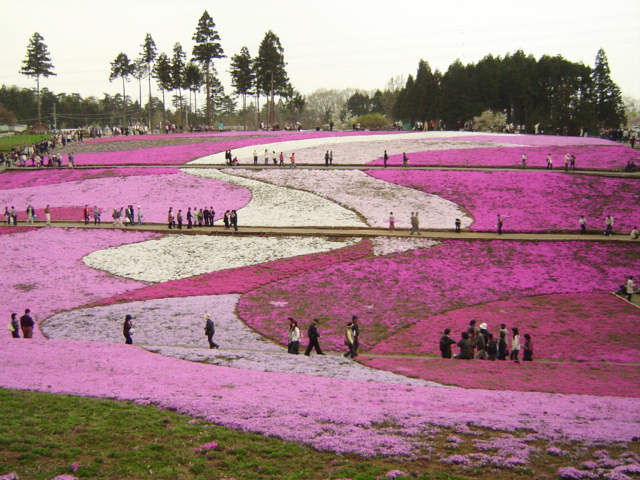
Hitsujiyama-park Phlox subulata

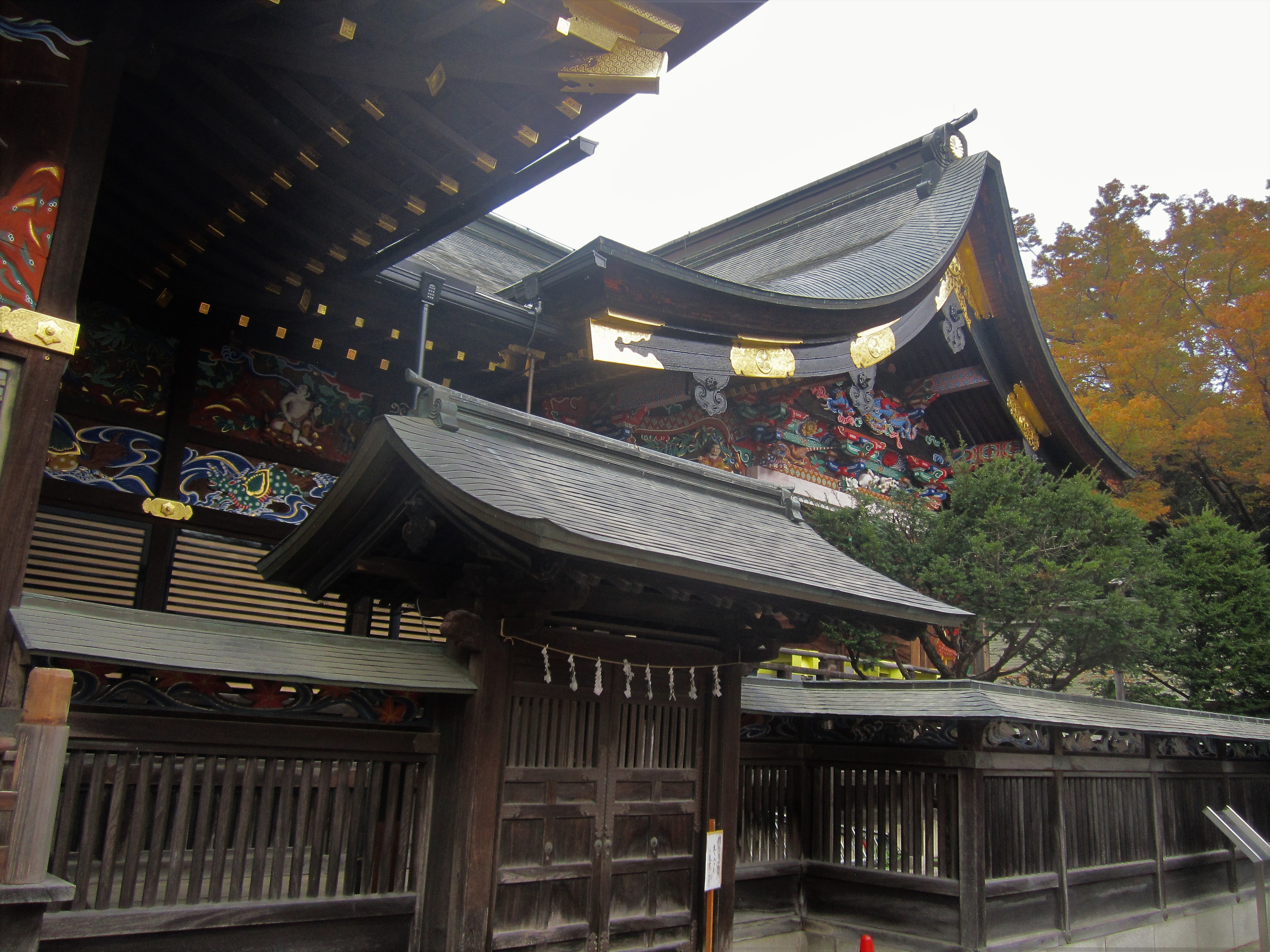
A main gate in Chichibu Shrine

On December 3, Chichibu holds an annual night festival (Intangible cultural heritage). It attracts crowds from Chichibu, Saitama prefecture, neighboring Tokyo, and the Kantō region. Kawase matsuri is Chichibu shrine's summer festival. It takes place every July 19 and July 20. Eight groups carrying special dashi floats march along to festival music around the city. Mikoshi (sacred portable shrines) are brought to special places in each neighborhood where they are enshrined. Neighborhood association heads wash the mikoshi in the Arakawa River.

Other attractions of the city include:

- Chichibu 34 Kannon Pilgrimage
- Chichibu Muse Park
- Chichibu Shrine
- Hitsujiyama Park
- Lake Chichibu
- Mitsumine Shrine
- Nakatsugawa Gorge
- Okuchichibu Mountains

== In popular media ==
As a picturesque area within fairly easy reach of Tokyo, Chichibu has been much photographed. However, the photography of Chichibu by the Chichibu native Bukō Shimizu (1913–1995) is particularly extensive: Shimizu presented photographs of the mountains, people and customs of Chichibu in numerous books for the Japanese market, starting in 1954.

The town of Chichibu is the setting for the popular anime series Anohana: The Flower We Saw That Day and the anime films The Anthem of the Heart and Her Blue Sky, all of which were written by Mari Okada who was born in Chichibu.

The town is also prominently featured in the manga and anime series Botan Kamiina Fully Blossoms When Drunk.

=== Possible connection with The Mikado ===
The city considers itself as the inspiration for Gilbert and Sullivan's 1885 comic opera, The Mikado; the name of the opera's setting, "Titipu", is pronounced "Chichipu" in Japanese. Rokusuke Ei, a popular essayist, was convinced that Chichibu, the site of a peasant uprising in 1884, inspired the author, W. S. Gilbert, to set the opera in Japan. Other Japanese researchers have concluded that Gilbert may simply have heard of Chichibu silk, an important export in the 19th century. A theatre company from Chichibu first presented The Mikado in Japanese in Chichibu on March 10, 2001, performed by local actors, and throughout other locations in Japan. In August 2006, it travelled with this production to the International Gilbert and Sullivan Festival in Buxton, England.

== Notable people ==
- Seijuro Arafune, Former Minister of Transport
- Tatsuya Fujiwara, actor
- Wakachichibu Komei, former sumo wrestler
- Arisa Nakajima, professional wrestler
- Mari Okada, screenwriter and director
- Akihito Ozawa, footballer
- Bukō Shimizu, photographer
- Akira Taue, professional wrestler

== See also ==
- Tabidachi no Hi ni - Popular Japanese graduation song that originated in the city
