= Arakawa, Saitama =

Dissolved municipality in Saitama prefecture, Japan

Coordinates: 35.950°N 139.033°E

Arakawa (荒川村, Arakawa-mura) was a village located in Chichibu District, Saitama Prefecture, Japan.

== History ==
As of 2003, the village had an estimated population of 6,184 and a density of 131.66 persons per km^{2}. The total area was 46.97 km^{2}.

On April 1, 2005, Arakawa, along with the town of Yoshida, and the village of Ōtaki (all from Chichibu District (all from Chichibu District), was merged into the expanded city of Chichibu and no longer exists as an independent municipality.
