= Mount Ryōkami =

Mountain in Saitama Prefecture, Japan

- 両神山
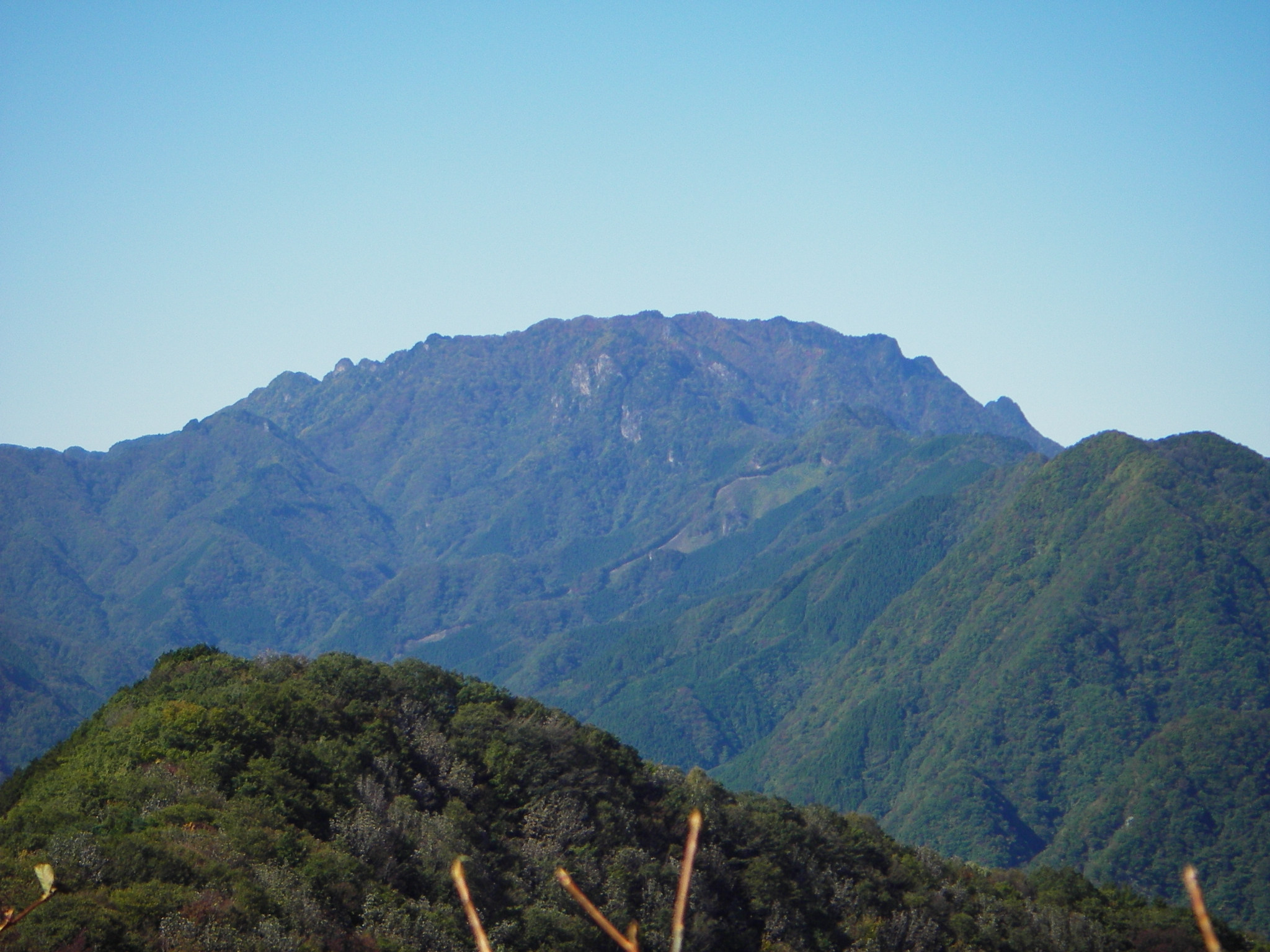
- The south east side of Mount Ryōkami

Highest point
- Elevation: 1,723 m (5,653 ft)
- Coordinates: 36°1′24″N 138°50′29″E

Geography
- Location: Kantō region, Japan

Mount Ryōkami (両神山, Ryōkamisan) is a mountain located in the Saitama Prefecture (Chichibu District), at the northern end of the Okuchichibu Mountains.
