= Ryōkami =

Village in Chichibu, Saitama, Japan

Ryōkami (両神村, Ryōkami-mura) was a village located in Chichibu District, Saitama Prefecture, Japan.

As of 2003, the village had an estimated population of 2,920 and a density of 40.88 persons per km^{2}. The total area was 71.42 km^{2}.

On October 1, 2005, Ryōkami was merged into the expanded town of Ogano and no longer exists as an independent municipality.
