= Blastmycin =

Names
- IUPAC name [(6S,7S,8R)-8-butyl-3-[(3-formamido-2-hydroxybenzoyl)amino]-2,6-dimethyl-4,9-dioxo-1,5-dioxonan-7-yl] 3-methylbutanoate
- Other names Antimycin A3

Identifiers
CAS Number	116095-17-1
3D model (JSmol)	Interactive image
ChemSpider	215110
EC Number	208-335-6
PubChem CID	10652
UNII	97YBD5W80B
- InChI: InChI=1S/C26H36N2O9/c1-6-7-9-18-23(37-20(30)12-14(2)3)16(5)36-26(34)21(15(4)35-25(18)33)28-24(32)17-10-8-11-19(22(17)31)27-13-29/h8,10-11,13-16,18,21,23,31H,6-7,9,12H2,1-5H3,(H,27,29)(H,28,32)/t15?,16-,18+,21?,23+/m0/s1 Key: PVEVXUMVNWSNIG-PVWHJNASSA-N
- SMILES: CCCC[C@@H]1[C@@H]([C@@H](OC(=O)C(C(OC1=O)C)NC(=O)C2=C(C(=CC=C2)NC=O)O)C)OC(=O)CC(C)C

Properties
Chemical formula	C_{26}H_{36}N_{2}O_{9}
Molar mass	520.579 g·mol^{−1}
- Except where otherwise noted, data are given for materials in their standard state (at 25 °C [77 °F], 100 kPa). Infobox references

Blastmycin is an antibiotic with the molecular formula C_{26}H_{36}N_{2}O_{9} which is produced by the bacterium Streptomyces blastmyceticus.
