= Chichibu Shrine =

Shinto shrine in Saitama Prefecture, Japan

Chichibu Shrine 秩父神社
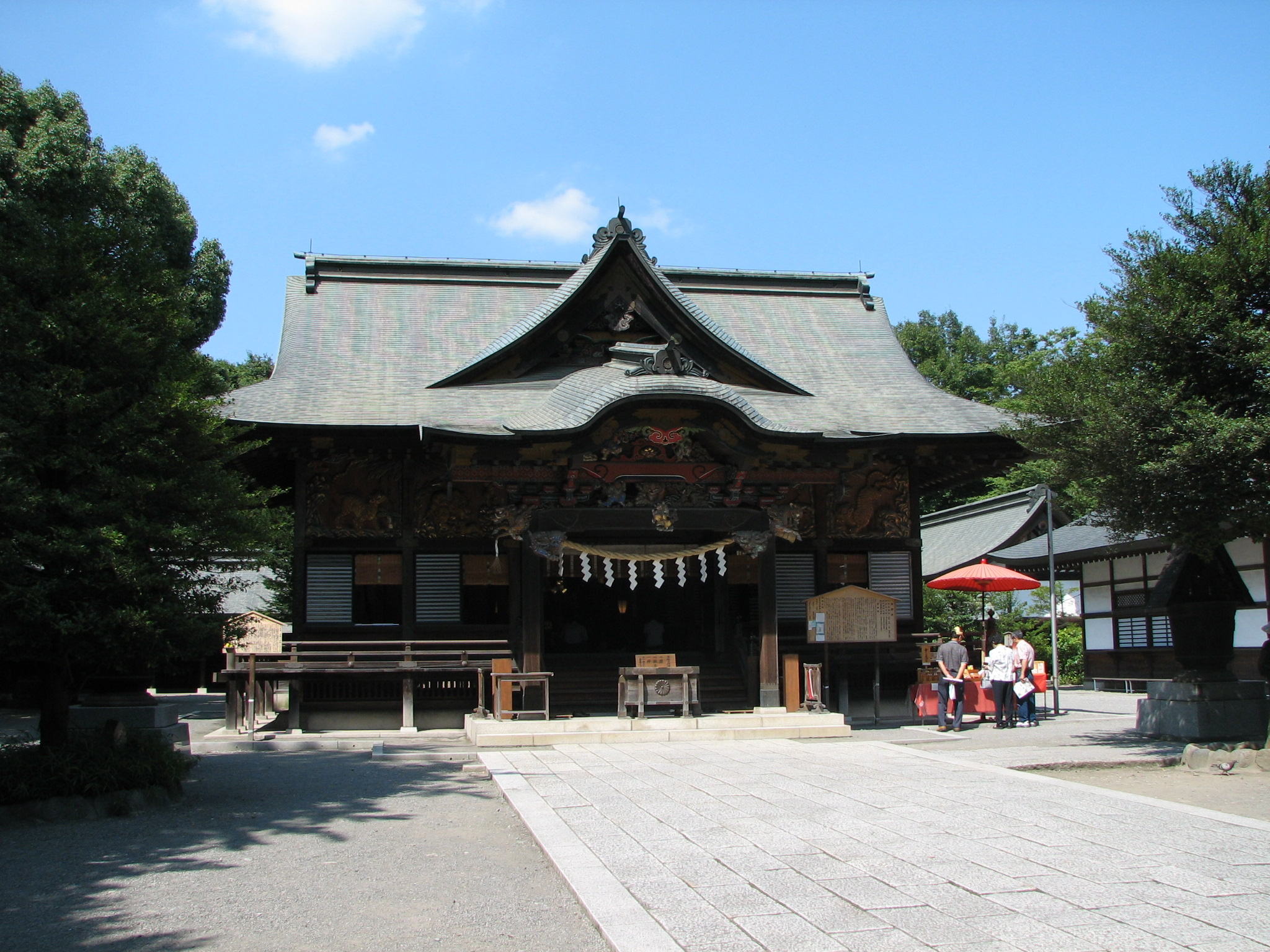
- The haiden (prayer hall)

- Location within Japan

Religion
- Affiliation: Shinto

Location
- Location: 1-3 Banba-machi, Chichibu, Saitama 368-0041
- Coordinates: 35°59′51″N 139°5′3″E

Website
- www.chichibu-jinja.or.jp

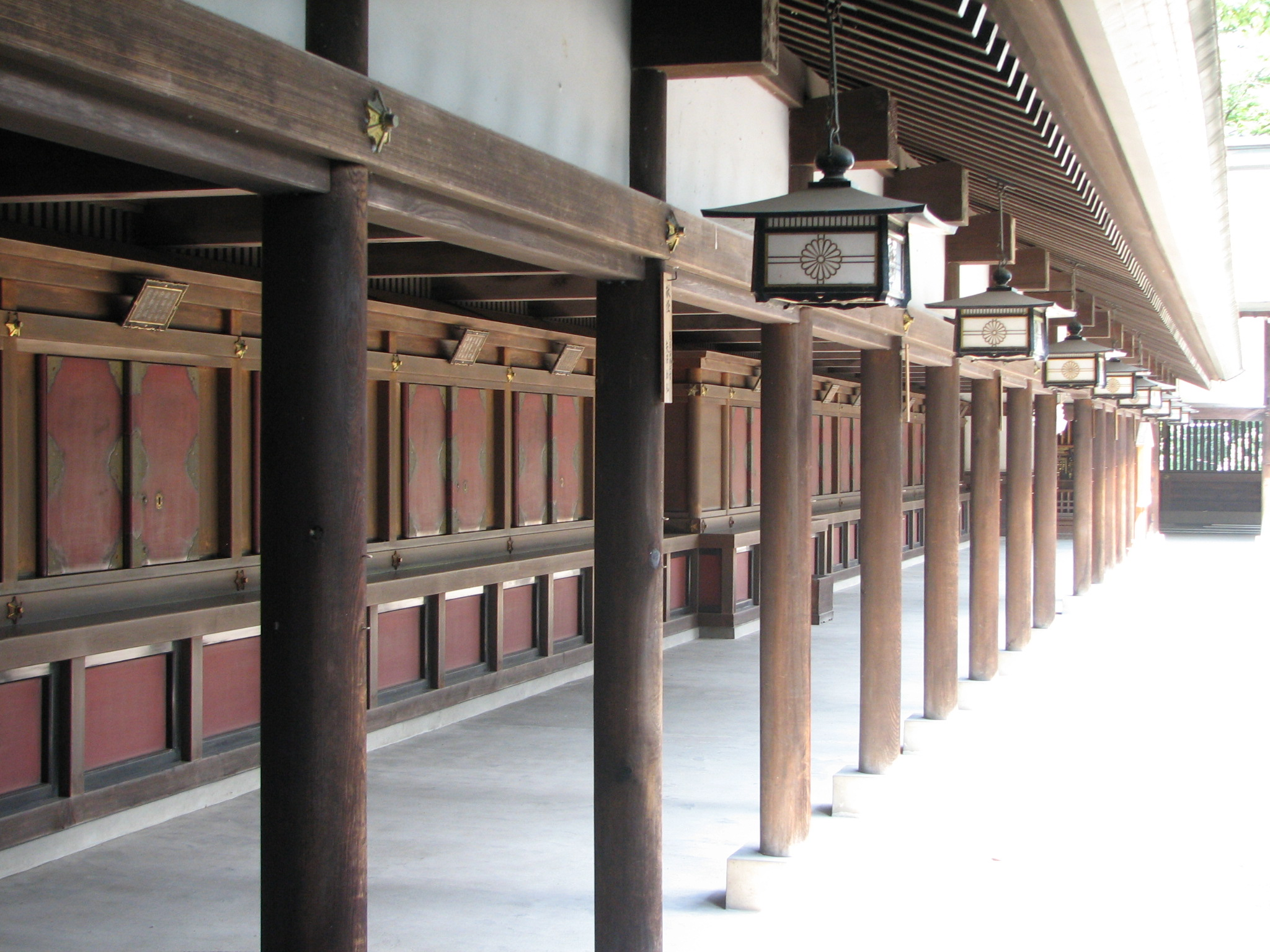
The Tenjin-chigisha is located on the grounds of the Chichibu Shrine.

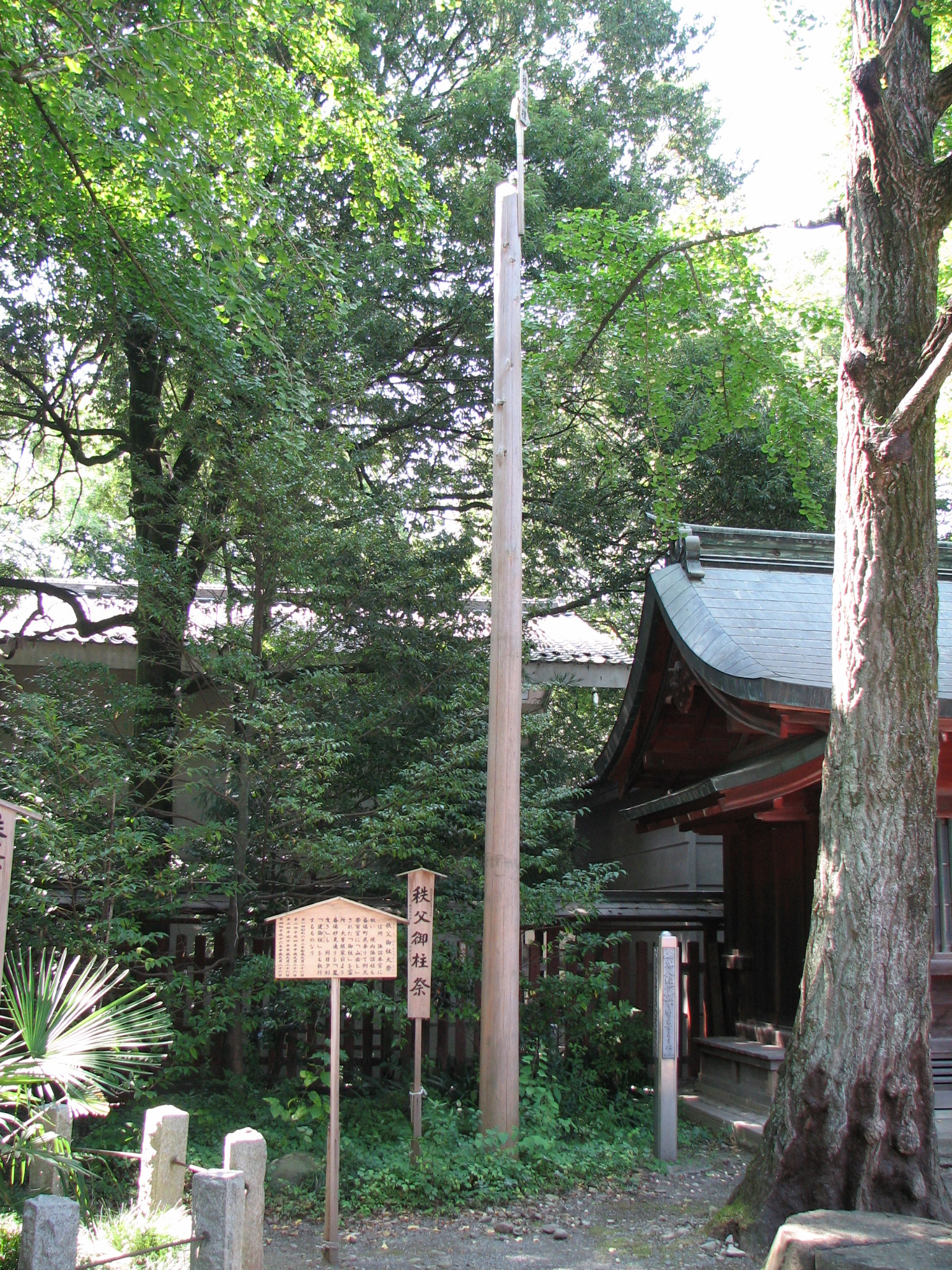
The onbashira is the focus of the Suwa Shrine festival.

The Chichibu Shrine (秩父神社, Chichibu-jinja) is a Japanese Shinto shrine at Chichibu in Saitama Prefecture.

== History ==
According to text in the Sendai Kuji Hongi (Kujiki), Chichibuhiko-no-mikoto, the tenth-generation descendant of the Kuni no miyatsuko of Chichibu Province, established the shrine in the tenth year of Emperor Sujin to worship Yagokoro-omoikane-no-mikoto. The shrine contains

- Yagokoroomoikane no mikoto (八意思兼命)
- Chichibuhiko no mikoto (知知夫彦命)
- Amenominakanushi-no-kami (天之御中主神)
- Prince Chichibu (秩父宮雍仁親王, Chichibu-no-Miya Yasuhito-shinnō)

During the Kamakura period, the shrine merged with a neighboring temple, and was known as Myōken-gū until the separation of Shinto and Buddhism (Shinbutsu bunri) in the late-19th century.

In the Edo period, it was one of 34 sacred sites of the old Chichibu Province or Chichibu District.

In the Meiji period it took the name Chichibu Shrine, with the characters 知知夫神社 appearing on the tablet of the torii.

In the system of ranked Shinto shrines, Chichibu was listed among the 3rd class of nationally significant shrines or kokuhei-shōsha (国幣小社).

The shrine's grounds include a number of subsidiary shrines. A Tenjin Shrine, Tōshō-gū, and a Suwa Shrine are among them.

== Events ==
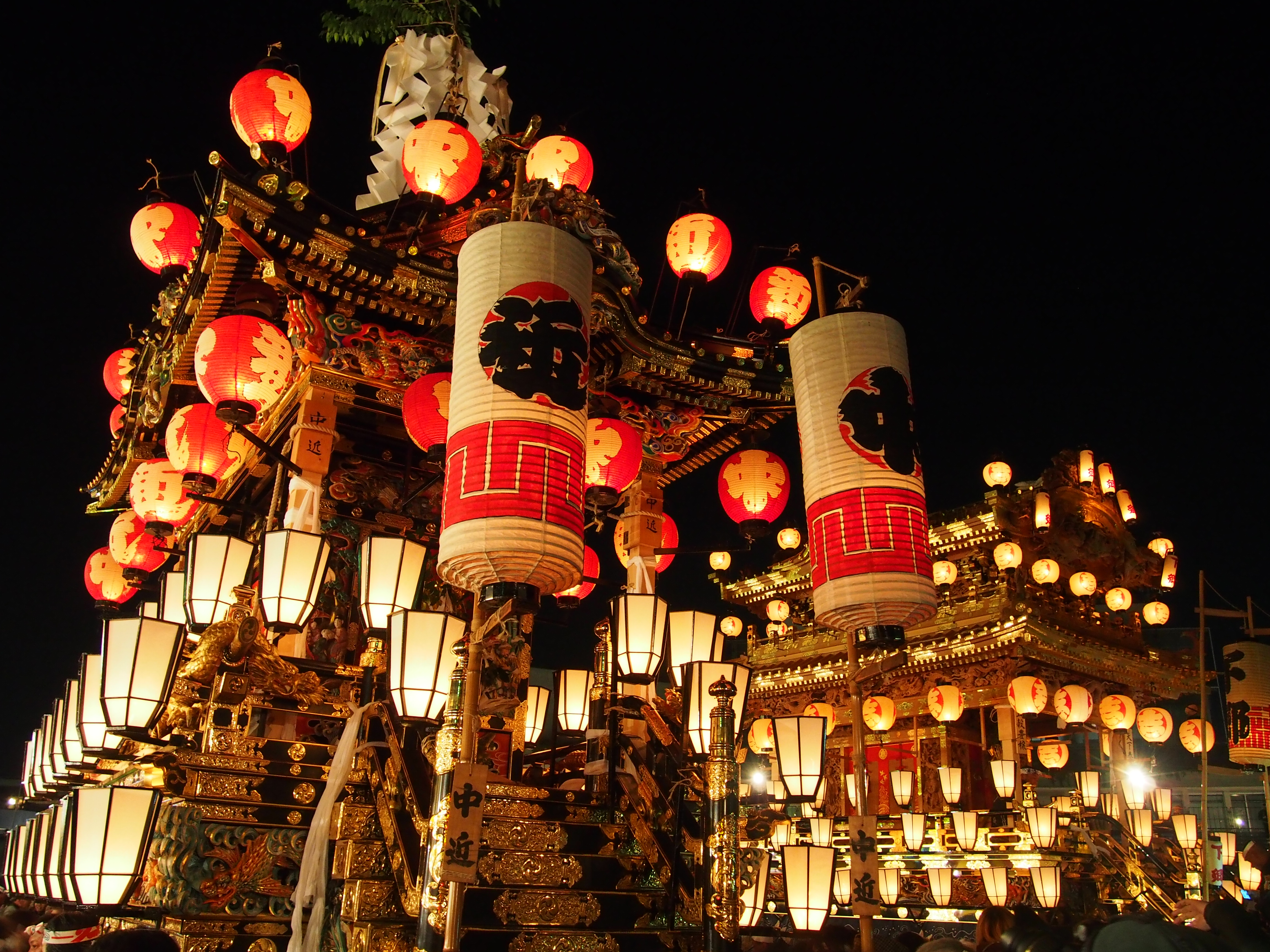
Chichibu's annual night festival

The shrine hosts a number of events. The rice-planting festival takes place annually on April 4. The mid-summer Kawase Festival is celebrated on July 19 and 20. The Banba-machi Suwa Shrine festival is not annual, but occasional. It resembles the Onbashira festival of the Suwa Taisha.

Chichibu's annual night festival draws the biggest crowds. Celebrated in December, it spans the first six days of the month. The parading of floats is listed as part of the national cultural heritage.

The national government has also recognized the shrine's sacred dance (kagura) as an important cultural asset. Similar honors have been awarded to its festival music, the floats, buildings and other possessions.

== See also ==
- List of Shinto shrines in Japan
- Modern system of ranked Shinto Shrines
