= Higashichichibu =

Higashichichibu 東秩父村
- Village
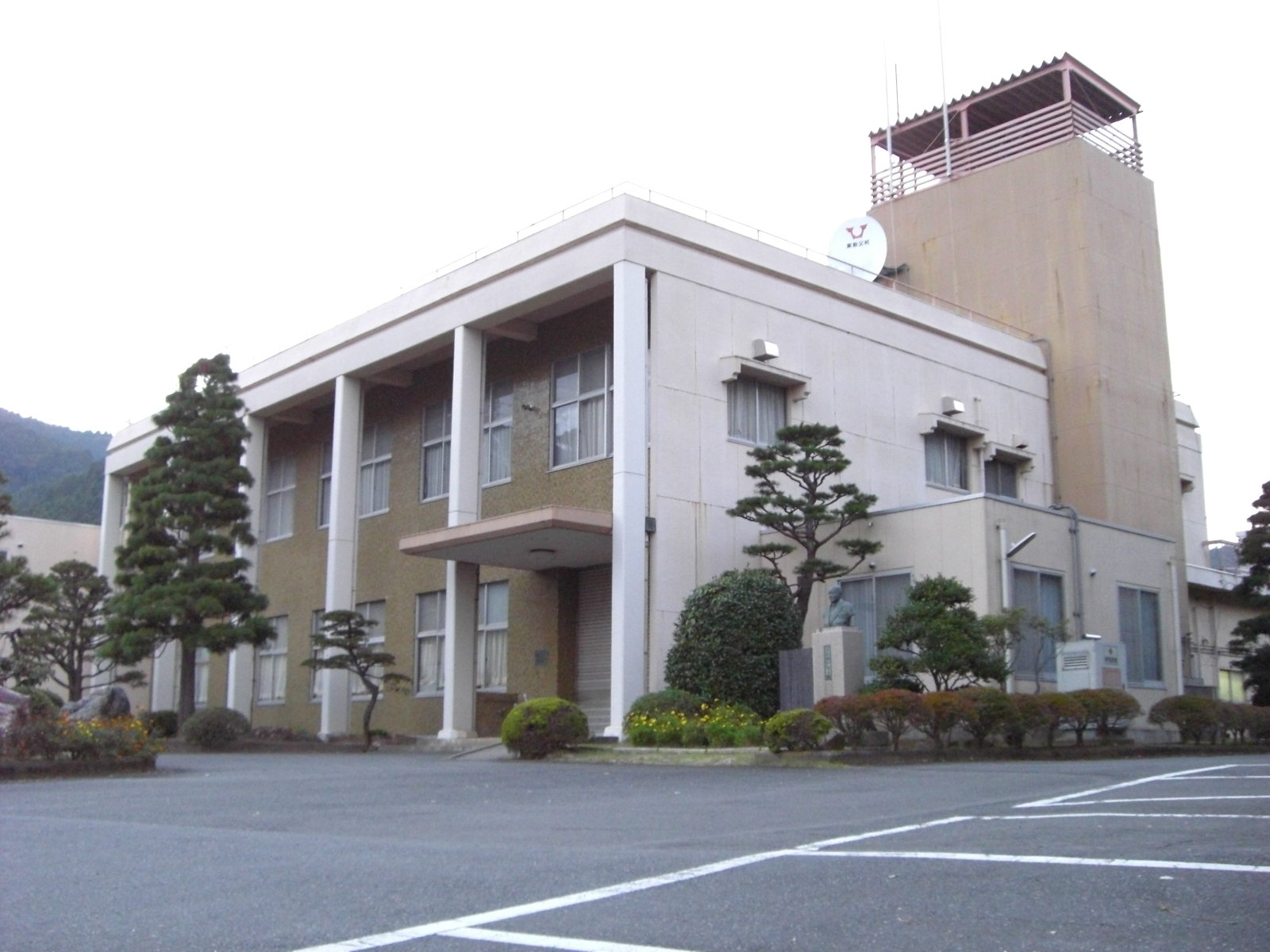
- Higashichichibu village hall

- Flag Seal

- Location of Higashichichibu in Saitama Prefecture

- Coordinates: 36°3′29.4″N 139°11′40.7″E
- Country: Japan
- Region: Kantō
- Prefecture: Saitama
- District: Chichibu

Area
  - Total: 37.06 km^{2} (14.31 sq mi)

Population (March 2021)
  - Total: 2,701
  - Density: 72.88/km^{2} (188.8/sq mi)
- Time zone: UTC+9 (Japan Standard Time)
- Tree: Zelkova serrata
- Flower: Azalea
- Bird: Japanese bush warbler
- Phone number: 0493-82-1221
- Address: Mido 634, Higashichichibu-mura, Chichibu-gun, Saitama-ken 355-0375
- Website: Official website

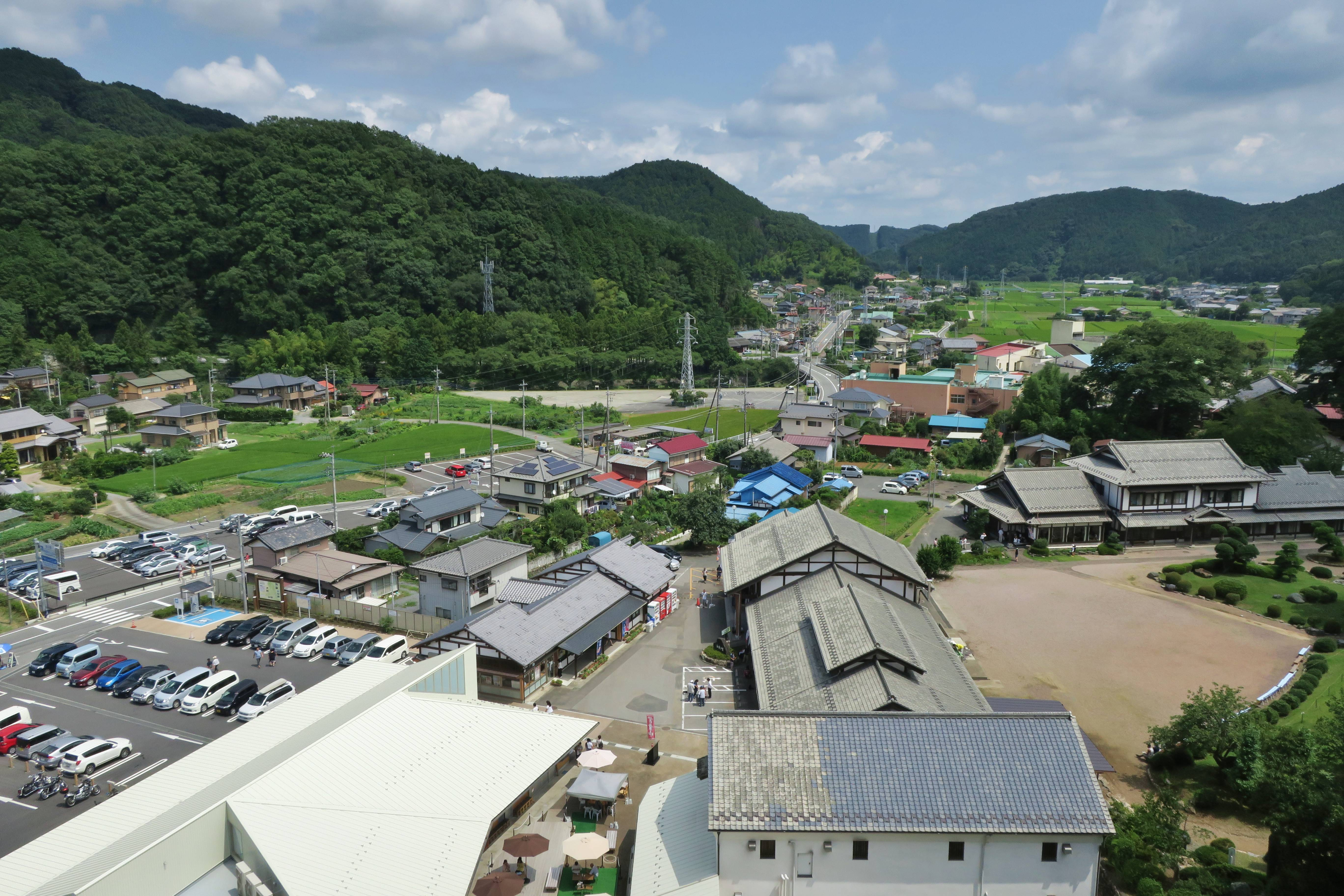
View from Michinoeki Washinosato

Higashichichibu (東秩父村, Higashichichibu-mura) is a village located in Saitama Prefecture, Japan. As of 1 March 2021, the village had an estimated population of 2,701 in 1083 households and a population density of 65 persons per km^{2}.

As of 1 February 2016, the village had an estimated population of 2,903, and a population density of 78.3 persons per km^{2}. Its total area is 37.06 square kilometres (14.31 sq mi). The area has historically been associated with washi (traditional Japanese paper).

== Geography ==
Higashichichibu is located in west-central Saitama Prefecture, in a valley isolated from the rest of the Chichibu plains by a range of low mountains.

=== Surrounding municipalities ===
Saitama Prefecture

- Chichibu
- Minano
- Ogawa
- Tokigawa
- Yorii

=== Climate ===
Higashichichibu has a humid continental climate (Köppen Cfa) characterized by warm summers and cool winters with light snowfall. The average annual temperature in Higashichichibu is 13.0 °C. The average annual rainfall is 1746 mm with September as the wettest month. The temperatures are highest on average in August, at around 21.9 °C, and lowest in January, at around minus 1.2 °C.

== Demographics ==
Per Japanese census data, the population of Higashichichibu has declined steadily over the past 70 years.

Historical population
Year	Pop.	±%
1920	5,716	—
1930	5,767	+0.9%
1940	5,674	−1.6%
1950	6,656	+17.3%
1960	5,881	−11.6%
1970	5,067	−13.8%
1980	4,704	−7.2%
1990	4,490	−4.5%
2000	4,119	−8.3%
2010	3,348	−18.7%
2020	2,709	−19.1%

== History ==
The villages of Okawara and Tsukikawa were created within Chichibu District, Saitama with the establishment of the modern municipalities system on April 1, 1889. The two villages merged to form Higashichichibu on August 1, 1956.

== Government ==
Higashichichibu has a mayor-council form of government with a directly elected mayor and a unicameral village council of eight members. Higashichichibu, together with the towns of Ogano, Minano, Nagatoro and Yokoze, contributes one member to the Saitama Prefectural Assembly. In terms of national politics, the village is part of Saitama 11th district of the lower house of the Diet of Japan.

== Economy ==
The economy of Higashichichibu is primarily agricultural with some light manufacturing. It is increasingly a bedroom community due to its proximity to the town of Ogawa.

== Education ==
Higashichichibu has one public elementary schools and one public middle school operated by the town government. The village does not have a high school.

== Transportation ==
=== Railway ===
Higashichichibu has no passenger rail service. The nearest station is Yorii Station, in the neighboring town of Yorii or Ogawamachi Station in the town of Ogawa.

=== Highway ===
Higashichichibu is not served by any of the Japanese national highways.

== Sister cities ==
- Ambert, Auvergne, France, since October 23, 1989
- (United States) Sterling, Colorado, USA, since March 17, 1997

== Local attractions ==
- Chichibu Washi no sato
