= Chichibu Province =

Former province of Japan

Coordinates: 36°01′25″N 139°00′54″E

Chichibu Province (知々夫国, Chichibu no Kuni; Japanese pronunciation: [tɕi̥ꜜ.tɕi.bɯ (no kɯ.ɲi), tɕi̥.tɕiꜜ.bɯ (no kɯ.ɲi), tɕi̥.tɕi.bɯ (no kɯ.ɲi)]) was an old province of Japan in the area that is today the western part of Saitama Prefecture.

== History ==
According to text in the Sendai Kuji Hongi (Kujiki), there was an area called Chichibu Province during the reign of Emperor Sujin. Since ancient times, Chichibu-jinja has been the main Shinto shrine in the area.

In the Edo period, a pilgrimage route linked together 34 sacred sites of the old Chichibu Province.

== See also ==
- Musashi Province
- Chichibu District, Saitama
- Thirteen Buddhas of Chichibu
