= Yoshida, Saitama =

Dissolved municipality in Saitama prefecture, Japan

Coordinates: 36.033°N 139.033°E

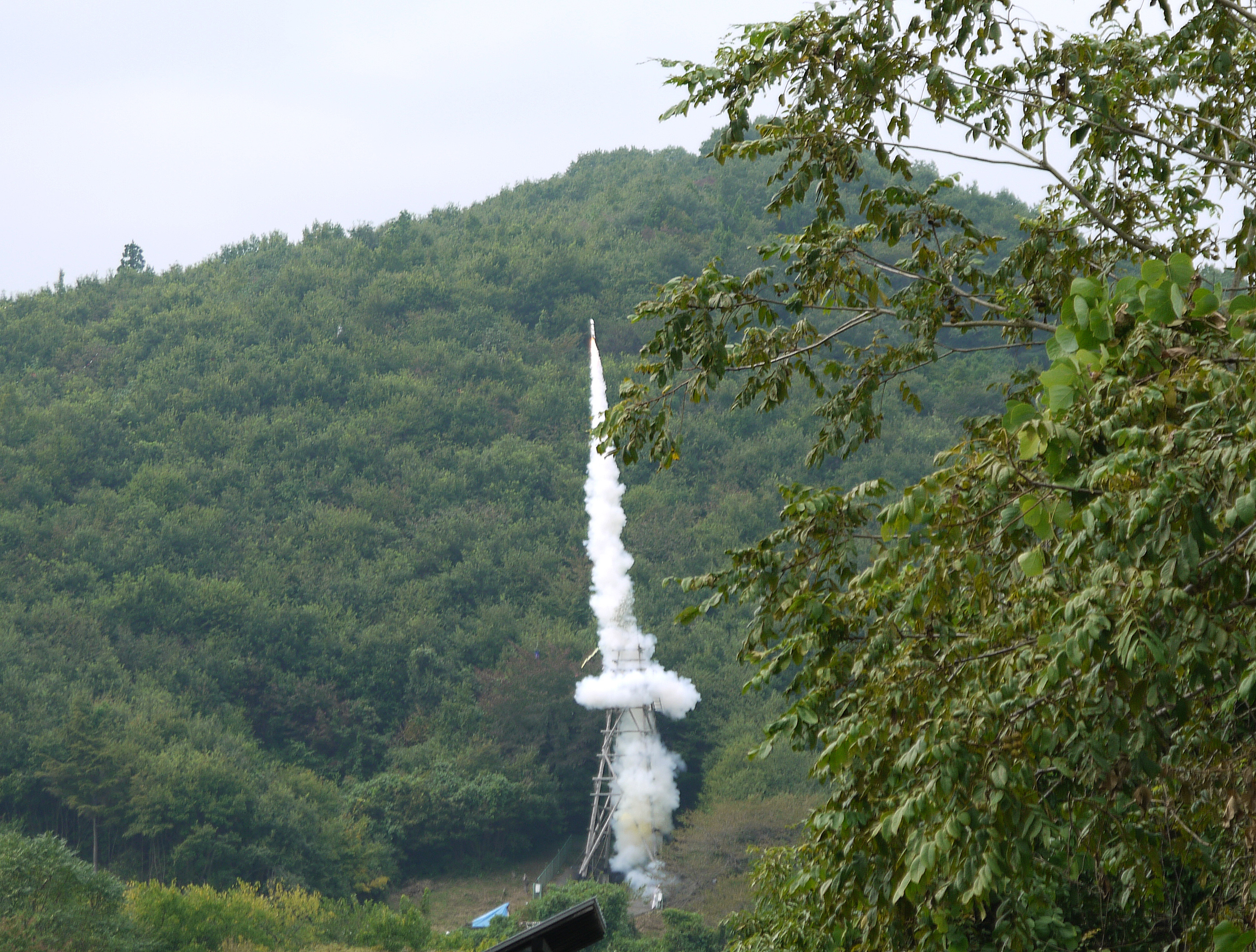
Ryusei Festival in Yoshida

Yoshida (吉田町, Yoshida-machi) was a town located in Chichibu District, Saitama Prefecture, Japan.

As of 2003, the town had an estimated population of 5,728 and a population density of 86.66 persons per km^{2}. The total area was 66.10 km^{2}.

On April 1, 2005, Yoshida, along with the villages of Arakawa and Ōtaki (all from Chichibu District), was merged into the expanded city of Chichibu and no longer exists as an independent municipality.
