= Chichibu incident =

1884 peasant revolt in Japan

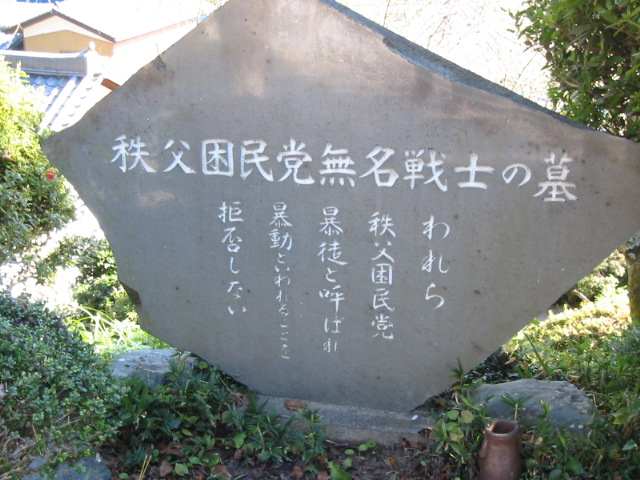
Memorial to the "unnamed dead" of the Chichibu Incident at Onraku-ji, Chichibu, Saitama

The Chichibu incident (秩父事件, Chichibu jiken), also known as Chichibu revolt, was a large-scale peasant revolt in November 1884 in Chichibu, Saitama, a short distance from Japan's capital. It lasted about two weeks.

It was one of many similar uprisings in Japan around that time, occurring in reaction to the dramatic changes to society in the wake of the 1868 Meiji Restoration. What set Chichibu apart was the scope of the uprising, and the severity of the government's response.

== Background ==
After the end of the Tokugawa shogunate with the Meiji Restoration of 1868, Japanese agriculture was dominated by a tenant farming system. The Meiji government based its industrialization program on tax revenues from private land ownership, and the Land Tax Reform of 1873 increased the process of landlordism, with many farmers having their land confiscated due to inability to pay the new taxes.

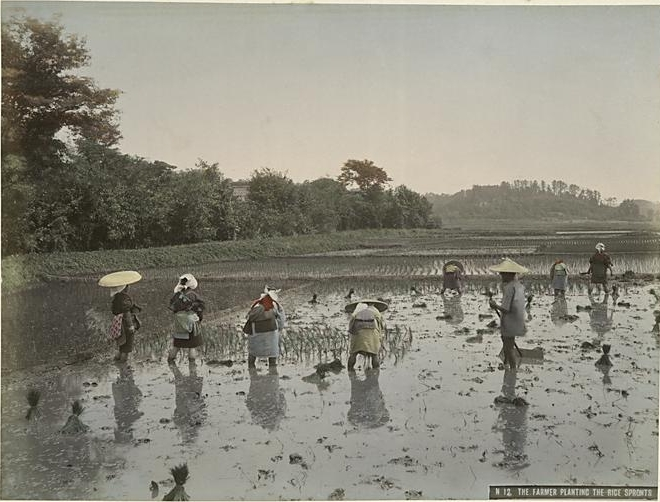
Rice planting in the 1890s. This scene remained virtually unchanged until the 1970s in some parts of Japan

This situation was worsened by the deflationary Matsukata Fiscal Policy from 1881, which severely depressed rice prices, leading to further bankruptcies. As tenants were forced to pay over half their crop as rent, they were often forced to send wives and daughters to textile mills or to sell daughters into prostitution to pay for taxes.

The rising discontent of the farmers (農民, nōmin) led to a number of peasant revolts in various impoverished rural areas around the country. The year 1884 saw roughly sixty riots; the total debt of the time of Japan's farmers is estimated to two hundred million yen, which corresponds to roughly two trillion yen in 1985 currency.

A number of these uprisings were organized and led through the "Freedom and People's Rights Movement" (自由民権運動, jiyū minken undō), a catch-all term for a number of disconnected meeting groups and societies throughout the country, consisting of citizens who sought more representation in government and basic rights. The national constitutions and other writings on freedom in the west were largely unknown among the Japanese masses at this time, but there were those in the movement who had studied the west and were able to conceive of democratic political ideology. Some societies within the movement wrote their own draft constitutions, and many saw their work as a form of yonaoshi (世直し, lit. "straightening the world"). Songs and rumors among the rebels often indicated their belief that the Liberal Party (自由党, Jiyūtō) would alleviate their problems.

== Uprising ==
While many groups and political parties across the country debated political issues peacefully, the self-titled "Revolutionary Army" erupted in revolt on 31 October 1884, in the Chichibu district of Saitama Prefecture. The uprising was triggered by the refusal of creditors to allow a moratorium on repayment of loans. The insurgents sought to attack a government building and loan shark offices and to destroy records of their debts.

Accounts of the size of the revolt varied widely, from 5,000 to over 10,000 men. Most of the rebels were armed with farming implements, bamboo spears, swords, wooden cannon, and hunting muskets. The rebels poured out of their small mountain villages, armed not only with weapons, but with banners and slogans; declaring "New Rule of Benevolence," and labeling the seized district office as the "Headquarters of the Revolutionary Army."

Having established a headquarters, the ringleaders adopted a new calendar, and began to issue decrees, labeling all as being issued in "Year One of Freedom and Self-Government." The revolutionaries also dispatched smaller groups to seek out and oust individual government officials in the neighboring villages before recalling their forces and marching toward Tokyo, where the movement first met with significant resistance.

The revolutionaries were met by the Tokyo Metropolitan Police and the new professional Imperial Japanese Army heavily armed with the newly engineered Murata rifle, and their advance ground to a halt under the overwhelming police and army firepower. Roughly ten days after the seizure of the district office, the Chichibu uprising was finally fully quashed at the foot of the Yatsugatake Mountains. The precise number of revolutionaries killed remains unknown. Many survivors were arrested, and nearly 3,000 were tried and convicted. Three hundred were convicted as felons, and the seven ringleaders were sentenced to death. Five of the seven were hanged less than three months later in February 1885.

Although this was the largest popular uprising of the Meiji period, or perhaps because of it, the government sought to dismiss it by describing the rebels as little more than hooligans.

== Legacy ==
Overall, the Chichibu Incident was caused by a combination of liberal, revolutionary ideologies and economic motivations. Though the traditional view of the event reduces the peasants' motivations to being purely economic, some scholars see it as part of a suppressed peoples' rights movement in this period. Irokawa Daikichi of Tokyo Keizai University, describes the incident in detail in his book, The Culture of the Meiji Period, and argues that it was not simply part of a yonaoshi movement, nor an ordinary uprising by poor peasants looking to absolve themselves of their debts. The leaders of the uprising, if not the majority of their followers, were active thinkers of the Freedom and People's Rights movements, and sought no less than to challenge the Meiji government itself. According to Irokawa, they were guided by "the revolutionary ideology of the Liberal Party; they had a revolutionary faith that they could 'reform the government, make freedom come to life, and join battle for the people.'"

Though a monument to the fallen was erected several decades later, a great number of the ringleaders and others who escaped formal punishment have never had their names officially cleared. A film, Kusa no Ran, appeared in 2004, directed by Seijirō Kōyama, commemorating the incident's 120th anniversary.

Some locals in Chichibu claim that the peasant revolt was the inspiration for the fictional setting of Titipu in the British comic opera The Mikado, while others suggested that the opera's librettist, W. S. Gilbert, was inspired by seeing kimonos made from Chichibu silk. In March 10, 2001, The Mikado was first performed in Chichibu by a cast of local actors.
