= Mount Bukō =

Mountain in Saitama Prefecture, Japan

- 武甲山
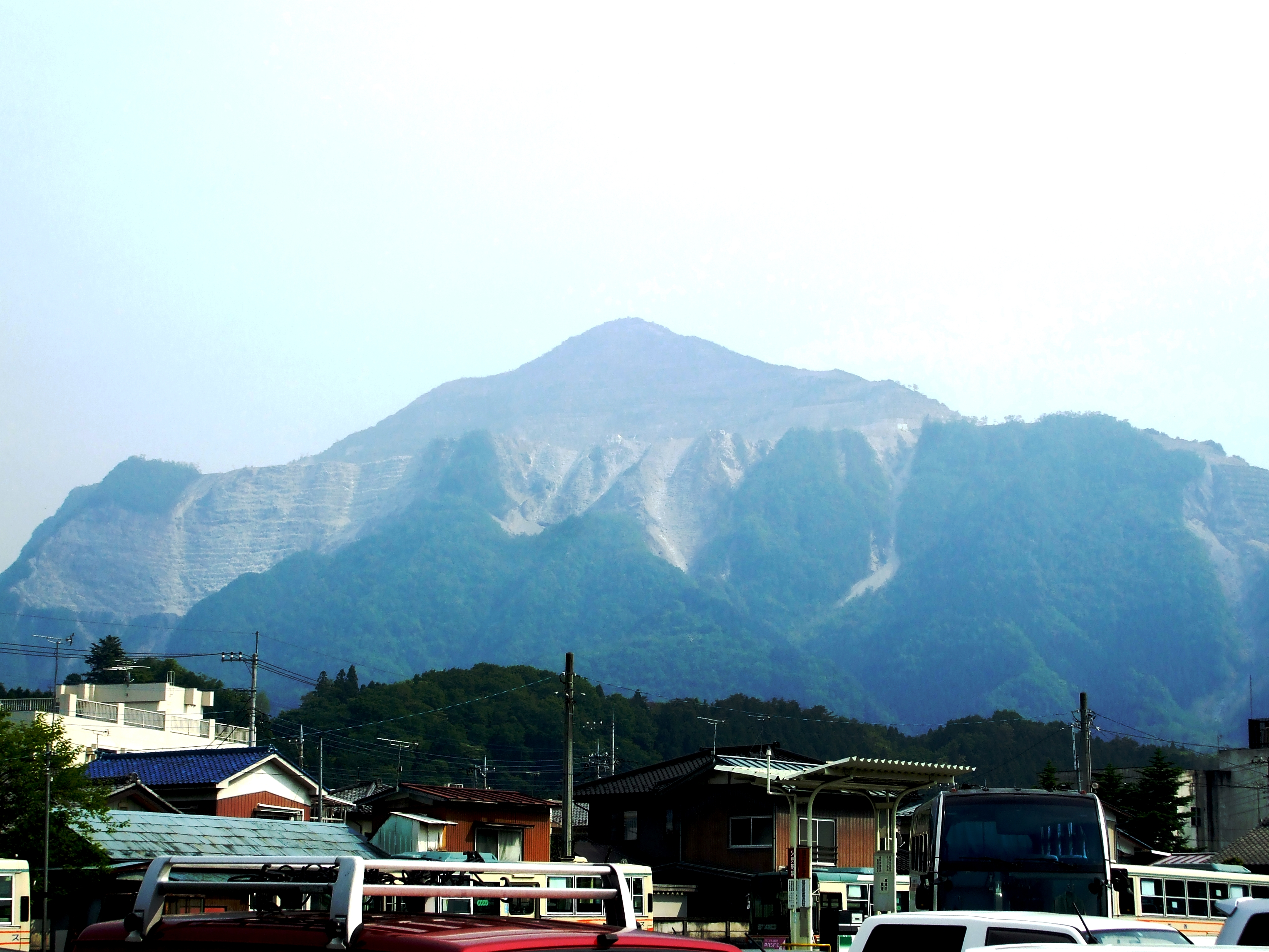
- Mount Bukō, with terracing from limestone mining clearly visible

Highest point
- Elevation: 1,304 m (4,278 ft)
- Coordinates: 35°57′06″N 139°05′52″E

Geography
- Location within Japan
- Location: Chichibu, Saitama, Japan

Mount Bukō (武甲山, Bukō-san) is a mountain in Chichibu, Saitama, Japan. A major regional source of limestone, it has been actively quarried since the Edo period.

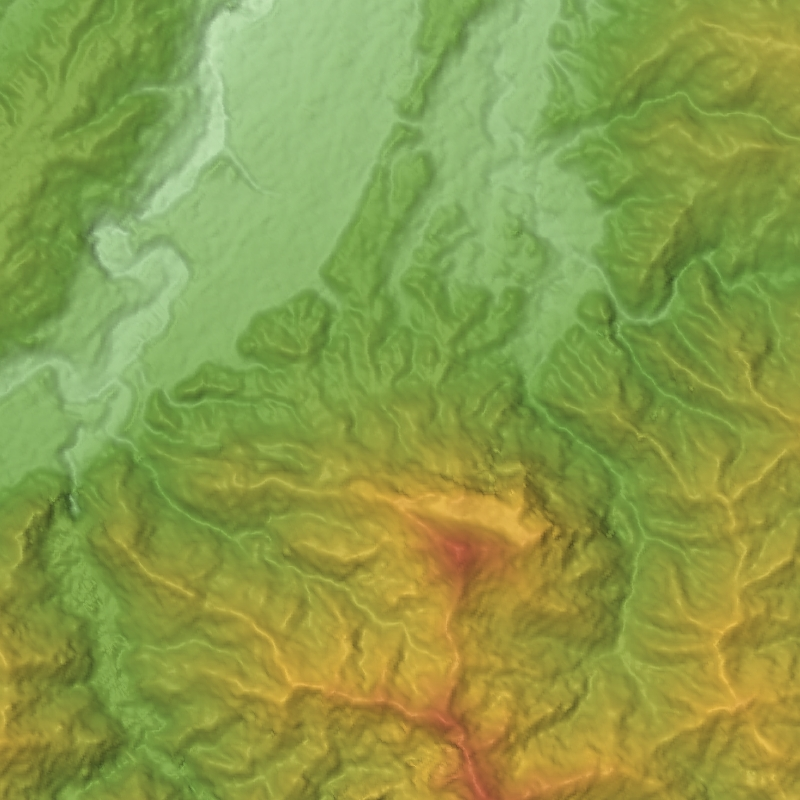
Relief map

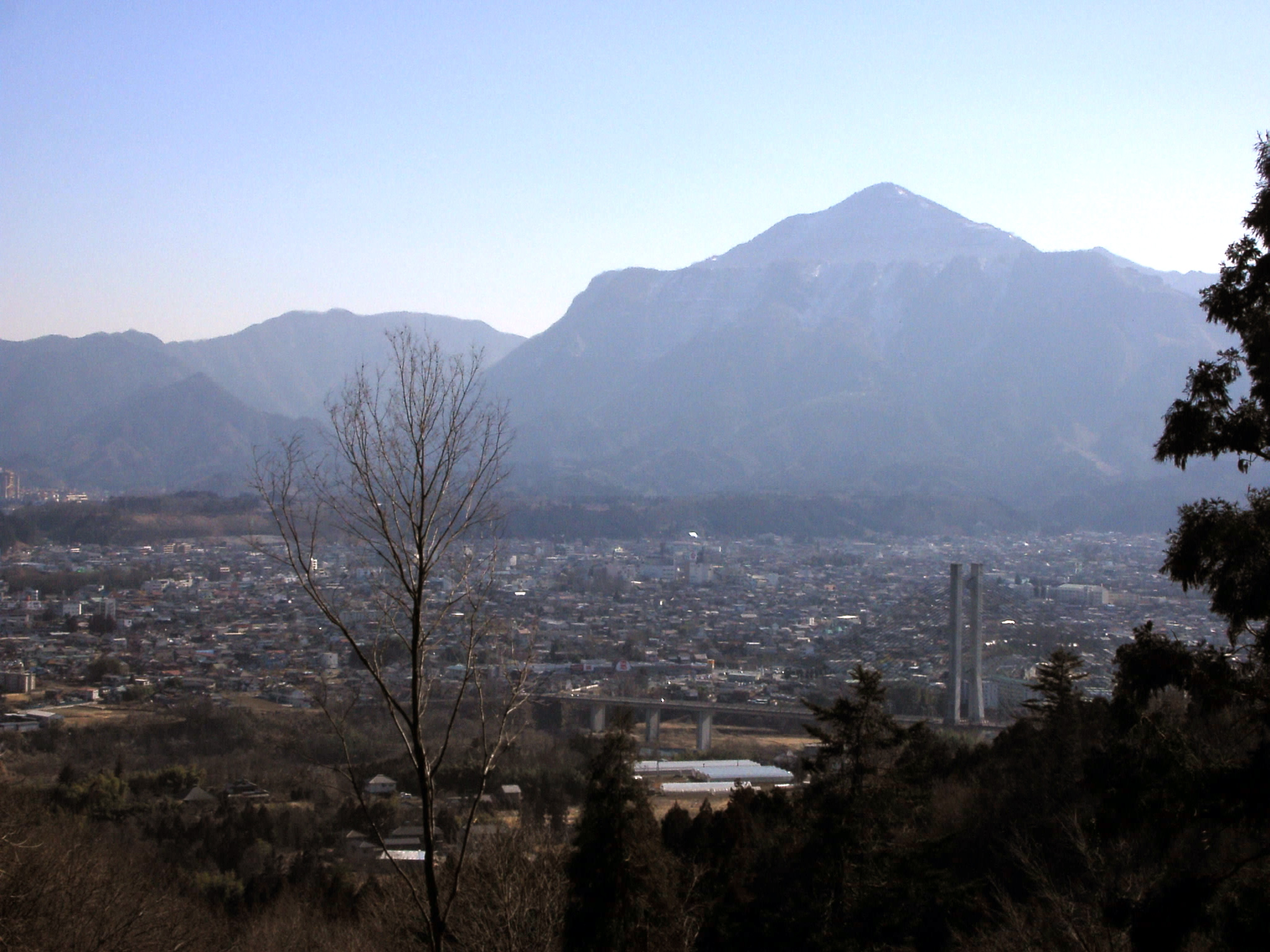
Downtown Chichibu

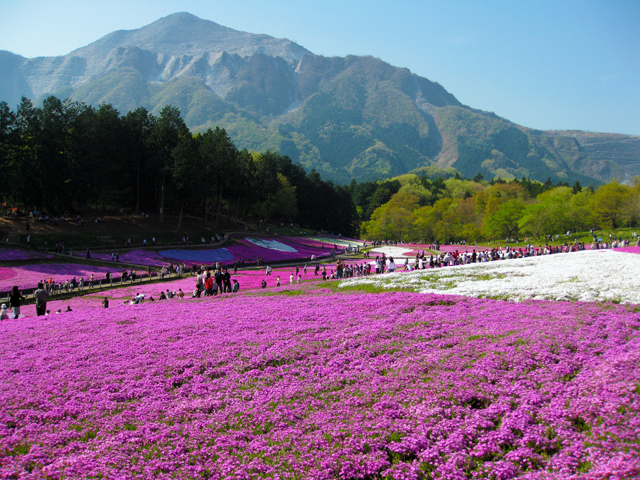
With Hitsujiyama Park
