= Chichibu District =

District in Saitama Prefecture, Japan

Coordinates: 36°01′25″N 139°00′54″E

Chichibu (秩父郡, Chichibu-gun) is a district located in Saitama Prefecture, Japan.

As of 2003, the district has an estimated population 755 and a density of 77.58 persons per km^{2}. The total area is 796.03 km^{2}.

== History ==
According to text in the Sendai Kuji Hongi (Kujiki), there was an area called Chichibu Province during the reign of Emperor Sujin. Since ancient times, Chichibu-jinja has been the main Shinto shrine in the district.

In the Nara period, copper was discovered in the district.

In the Edo period, a pilgrimage route linked together 34 sacred sites of the old Chichibu Province

== Timeline ==
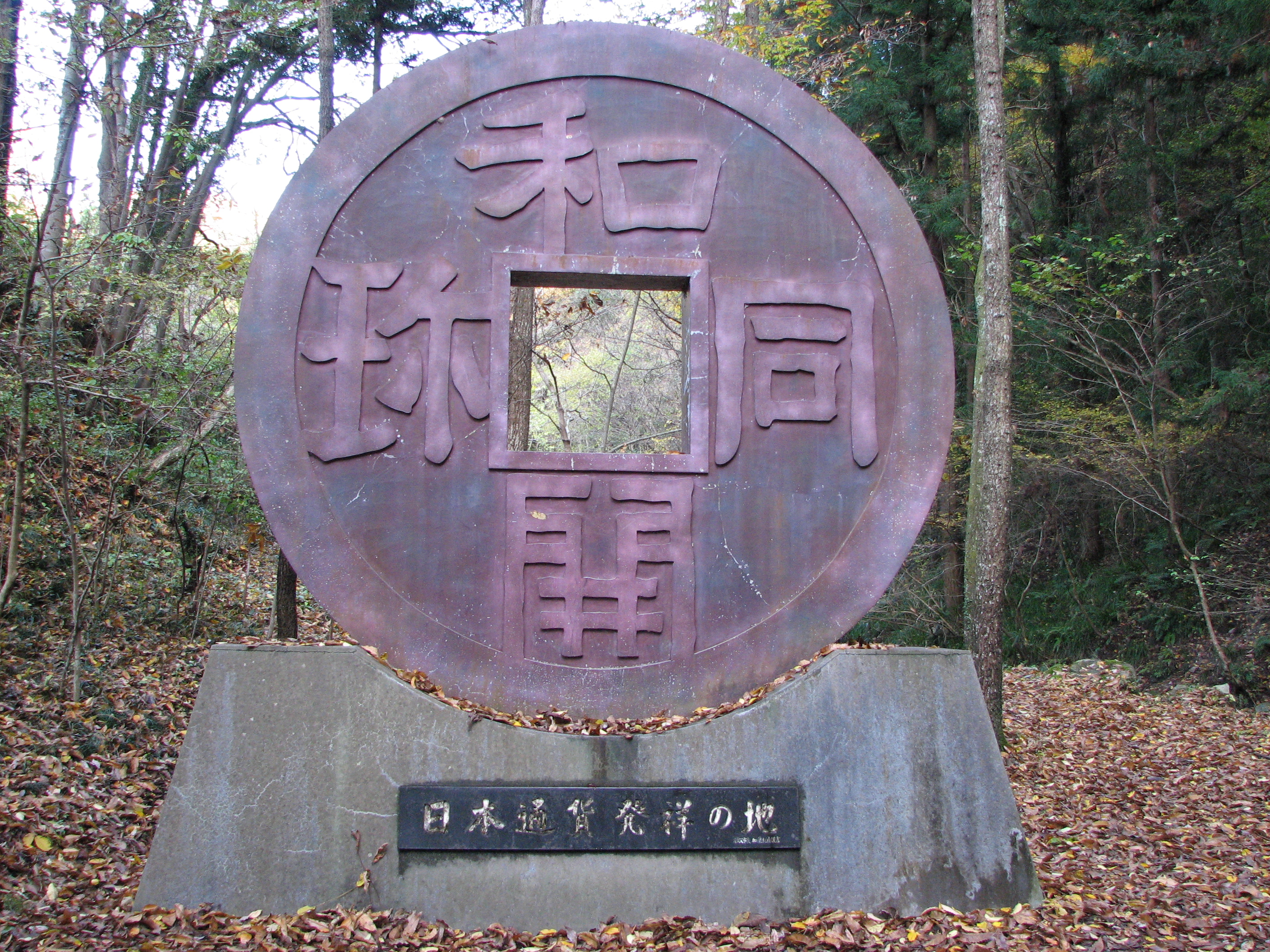
Wadōkaichin monument in Saitama

- 708: Deposits of the metal copper was discovered in the region and offered to the Imperial Court. The era name Wadō (和銅, meaning "Japanese copper") was proclaimed in recognition of this welcome event in the initial months of Empress Genmei's reign. The copper was used to mint Wadō Kaihō or Wadō Kaichin, which are amongst the oldest examples of coinage in Japan.
- 1884: The Chichibu incident: uprising of impoverished peasants under the influence of the Freedom and People's Rights Movement. Seven were sentenced to death and over 4,000 people were punished.
- 1889: Ōmiya town was founded.
- 1914: Chichibu Railway was opened.
- 1916: Ōmiya town was renamed Chichibu town.
- 1946 (December 1): The town of Mino was split off to the town of Minano and the villages of Misawa, Kunikami, Hinozawa, Kanazawa and Ota.
- 1948 (April 1): The district transferred the village of Yano to Kodama District.
- 1950 (April 1): The town of Chichibu changed to Chichibu City.
- 1954: Chichibu City absorbed Harase, Haraya, Hisana, Kuna, Odamaki and Otasho villages.
- 1955 (February 11): Yokoze is created when Yokoze and Agakubo villages are merged; and Tokikawa is created when Okado, Hira and Ankaku villages are merged in Hiki District.
- 1955 (March 1): Minano is created when the town of Minano and the villages of Kunikami, Kanazawa and Hinozawa are merged.
- 1955 (April 1): The town of Ogano is expanded by absorbing the village of Nagawaka.
- 1956 (March 31): The town of Ogano is expanded by absorbing the villages of Kurao and Mitagawa
- 1956 (August 1): Yoshida is expanded by absorbing Kamiyoshida village; and Higashichichibu is created by the merger of Tsukikawa and Okawahara villages.
- 1956 (September 30): The Town of Kagemori is created by the merger of Urayama and Kagemori villages.
- 1957: Chichibu City absorbed Takashino and Ōta villages.
- 1957 (March 31): Minano absorbed Misawa village.
- 1957 (May 3): Chichibu City absorbs Takajo and Ota villages.
- 1958 (May 31): Chichibu City absorbed Kagemori town.
- 1969: Seibu Railway Seibu Chichibu Line was opened.
- 1972 (November 11): Nagatoro created by renaming the town of Nogami.
- 1984 (October 1): The village of Yokoze gained town status.
- 2005 (April 1): Chichibu City absorbs Yoshida and the villages of Arakawa and Ōtaki
- 2005 (October 1): Ogano absorbs the village of Ryōkami

== Municipalities ==
Chichibu District has five municipalities:

- Minano
- Nagatoro
- Ogano
- Yokoze
- Higashichichibu
