= Graduate School of Engineering and Faculty of Engineering, Kyoto University =

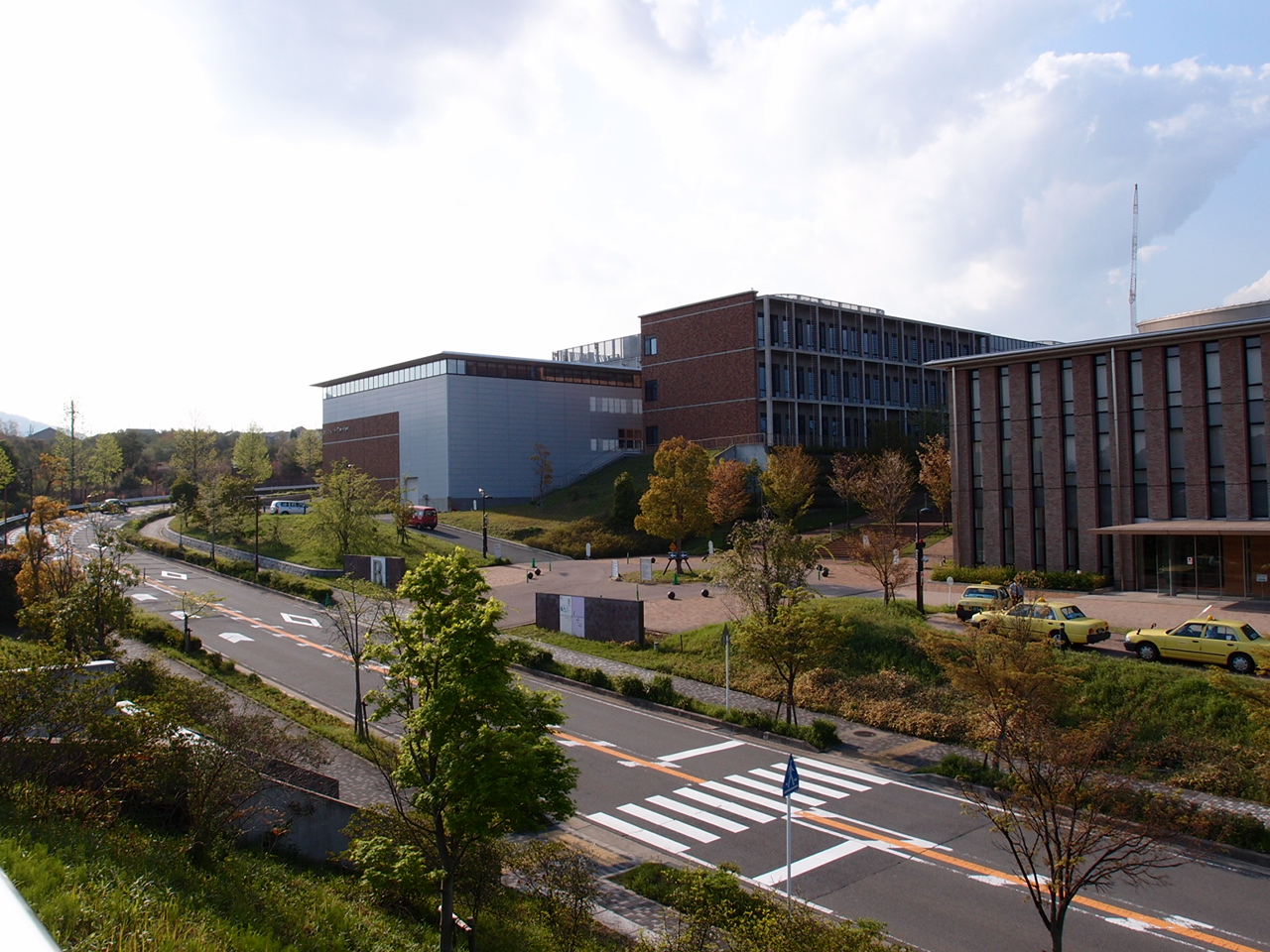
Katsura Campus

Graduate School of Engineering and Faculty of Engineering (京都大学大学院工学研究科・工学部) is one of schools at the Kyoto University. The Faculty (Undergraduate) and the Graduate School operate as one.

According to the QS World University Rankings by Subject 2020 in the field of Engineering & Technology, KU is ranked third in Japan after University of Tokyo and TokyoTech.

== History ==
In 1897, College of Science and Engineering (理工科大学) was established with the establishment of Imperial University of Kyoto. It was divided into College of Engineering (工科大学) and College of Science in 1914.

College of Engineering was reorganized into Faculty of Engineering (工学部) in 1919.

In 1953, Graduate School of Engineering (工学研究科) was established.

In the 1990s, A four-year plan to emphasize graduate school education was implemented and some departments were converted into independent graduate schools; Graduate School of Energy Science was established in 1996 and Graduate School of Informatics in 1998.

== Divisions ==
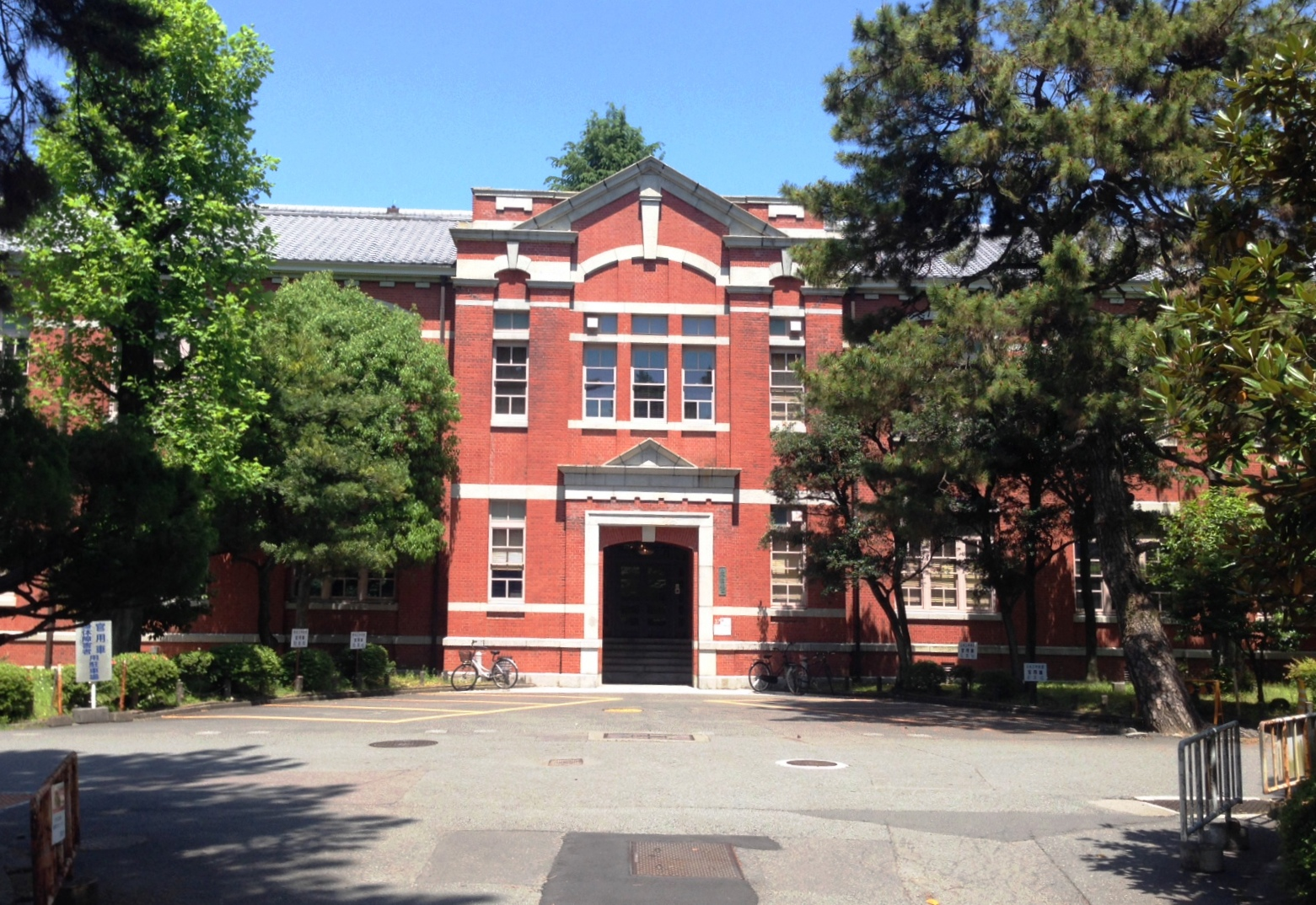
Civil Engineering Classroom

It consists of the undergraduate schools, departments and centers.

=== Undergraduate Schools ===
The Faculty of Engineering has 6 Undergraduate Schools, some of which have more specialized courses.

- Civil, Environmental and Resources Engineering
  - Civil Engineering course
  - Environmental Engineering course - connected to the Graduate School of Global Environmental Studies
  - Earth Resources and Energy Engineering course - connected to the Graduate School of Energy Science
- Architecture
- Engineering Science
  - Mechanical and Systems Engineering course
  - Aeronautics and Astronautics course
  - Materials Science course
  - Nuclear Engineering course
  - Applied Energy Science and Engineering course
- Electrical and Electronic Engineering
- Informatics and Mathematical Science - connected to the Graduate School of Informatics
  - Applied Mathematics and Physics course
  - Computer Science course
- Chemical Science and Technology
  - Frontier Chemistry course
  - Advanced Chemistry course
  - Chemical Process Engineering course

=== Departments ===
Graduate School of Engineering has 17 departments for research and graduate education.

- Civil and Earth Resources Engineering
- Urban Management
- Environmental Engineering
- Architecture and Architectural Engineering
- Mechanical Engineering and Science
- Micro Engineering
- Aeronautics and Astronautics
- Nuclear Engineering
- Materials Science and Engineering
- Electrical Engineering
- Electronic Science and Engineering
- Material Chemistry
- Energy and Hydrocarbon Chemistry
- Molecular Engineering
- Polymer Chemistry
- Synthetic Chemistry and Biological Chemistry
- Chemical Engineering

=== Centers and Facilities ===
- Photonics and Electronics Science and Engineering Center
- Research Center for Environmental Quality Management
- Quantum Science and Engineering Center
- Katsura Int'tech Center
- Center for Information Technology
- Occupational Health, Safety and Environmental Management Center
- Engineering Education Research Center
- Research Administration Center
- The Unit for Enhancement of Engineering Higher Education in Myanmar
- Technical Office
- Radioisotope Research Laboratory
- Libraries
