= Yoshida (disambiguation) =

Yoshida is a Japanese surname.

Yoshida may also refer to:

== Places ==
- Yoshida District, Fukui, a district, consisted of Eiheiji, Fukui
- Yoshida, Ehime, a former town, merged to and currently a part of Uwajima, Ehime
- Yoshida, Hiroshima, a former town, merged to and currently a part of Akitakata, Hiroshima
- Yoshida, Kagoshima, a former town, merged to and currently a part of Kagoshima, Kagoshima
- Yoshida, Niigata, a former town, merged to and currently a part of Tsubame, Niigata
- Yoshida, Saitama, a former town, merged to and currently a part of Chichibu, Saitama
- Yoshida, Shimane, a former village, merged to and currently a part of Unnan, Shimane
- Yoshida, Shizuoka, a town in Shizuoka Prefecture
- Yoshida dormitory, Kyoto University (the oldest & self-governing student house in Japan)

== Other uses ==
- Yoshida Foods International, a food company based in Portland, Oregon
- Yoshida Shrine, a Shinto shrine in Kyoto

== See also ==
- Fujiyoshida, Yamanashi, a city in Yamanashi Prefecture
- YKK Group, originally Yoshida Kōgyō Kabushiki Gaisha
- Yoshida Station (disambiguation)
