= Comprehensive high school =

Type of public high school in the United States

Comprehensive high schools are the most widely adopted form of public high schools around the world, designed to provide a well-rounded education to its students. The typical comprehensive high school offers more than one course program of specialization to its students. Comprehensive high schools generally offer a college preparatory course program and one or more foreign language, scientific or vocational course programs. Alternatively, in some educational systems examinations are used to sort students into different high schools for different populations. Other types of high schools specialize in university-preparatory school academic preparation, remedial instruction, or vocational instruction.

== Tracking system in comprehensive high schools ==
The tracking system is a way to group students into different class levels based on their academic abilities in comprehensive high school. For example, the English course is a mandatory course for all students; there are four tracks: gifted, advanced, average, and remedial. This tracking system allows teachers to guide students more efficiently with customized learning needs and speeds and make sure students match courses with their ability levels.

However, it also brings equity problems that reinforce the academic divisions in the education system. There are critics of the tracking system that it affects students placed on lower tracks by providing less challenging education, lowering their self-worth and self-esteem, which can restrict their potential academic achievement, personal growth, and future aspirations.

== Comparison with other types of high schools ==
Other than the comprehensive high school, there are many other types of high schools. Studies show the difference in multiple aspects of the difference comparing comprehensive high schools and STEM-focused high schools or career academy high schools.

In comparison with STEM-focused high schools, comprehensive high schools don't show a significant difference in providing STEM opportunities for students, which breaks people's assumption that specialized programs must offer more in that area.

In comparison with career academy high schools, researchers compared the students’ engagement in college and career readiness activities as an outcome of adopting students in future preparation. The researchers found that students in schools with high-level fidelity NAF (an organization aid to evaluate and improve schools) have higher engagement than students in comprehensive high school, while students in schools with low or medium fidelity in the NAF don't show a significant difference from students in the comprehensive high school.

Other than studying the outcomes, researchers examined the bullying problem between these two types of high schools and revealed that students in career academy high schools experience less bullying than students in comprehensive high schools. The potential factors are the size of the school and income level. Comprehensive high schools are usually larger, which is more likely to happen bullying issues, and schools in low-income areas tend to have bullying in school.

== See also ==
- Comprehensive school – the equivalent in the UK and elsewhere
- Continuation high school
- Alternative school
