= Academic major =

Focus of academic study

An academic major is the academic discipline to which an undergraduate student formally commits. A student who successfully completes all courses required for the major qualifies for an undergraduate degree. The word major (also called concentration, particularly at private colleges) is also sometimes used administratively to refer to the academic discipline pursued by a graduate student or postgraduate student in a master's or doctoral program.

In the United Kingdom, Australia, and many other Commonwealth nations, the term "course" or "subject" is used instead of "major." In these systems, as well as in many European countries under the Bologna Process, degrees are typically more specialized from the start, and students focus on their primary field of study for the entire duration of their degree.

An academic major typically involves completion of a combination of required and elective courses in the chosen discipline. The latitude a student has in choosing courses varies from program to program. An academic major is administered by select faculty in an academic department. A major administered by more than one academic department is called an interdisciplinary major. In some settings, students may be permitted to design their own major, subject to faculty approval.

In the United States, students are usually not required to choose their major discipline when first enrolling as an undergraduate. In addition, most colleges and universities require that all students take a general core curriculum in the liberal arts. Normally students are required to commit by the end of their second academic year at latest, and some schools even disallow students from declaring a major until this time. A student who declares two academic majors is said to have a double major. A coordinate major is an ancillary major designed to complement the primary one. A coordinate major requires fewer course credits to complete. Many colleges also allow students to declare a minor field, a secondary discipline in which they also take a substantial number of classes, but not so many as would be necessary to complete a major.

== History ==
The roots of the academic major as we now know it first surfaced in the 19th century as "alternative components of the undergraduate degree". Before that, all students receiving an undergraduate degree would be required to study the same slate of courses geared at a comprehensive "liberal education".

In 1825, the University of Virginia initiated an educational approach that would allow students to choose from an area of focus. Offering eight options (which included ancient languages, anatomy, medicine), other higher educational systems in Europe began to develop into a stricter specialization approach to studies after the American Civil War.

In the United States, in the second half of the 19th century, concentrated foci at the undergraduate level began to prosper and popularize, but the familiar term "major" did not appear until 1877 in a Johns Hopkins University catalogue. The major generally required 2 years of study, while the minor required one.

From 1880 to 1910, Baccalaureate granting American institutions vastly embraced a free-elective system, where students were endowed with a greater freedom to explore intellectual curiosities.

The 1930s witnessed the appearance of first interdisciplinary major: American studies. Culture was the grounding concept and orchestrating principle for its courses. 1960s to 1970s experienced a new tide of interdisciplinary majors and a relaxation of curriculum and graduation requirements. (Civil Rights Movement spawned Women's studies and Black Studies, for example.) In the 1980s and 1990s, "interdisciplinary studies, multiculturalism, feminist pedagogy, and a renewed concern for the coherence and direction of the undergraduate program began to assail the Baccalaureate degree dominated by the academic major."

== Major's significance ==
The academic major is considered a defining and dominant characteristic of the undergraduate degree. "The ascendancy of the disciplines in the late nineteenth century and their continuing dominance throughout the twentieth century have left an indelible imprint on the shape and direction of the academic major" and research affirms that the academic major is the strongest and clearest curricular link to gains in student learning. While general education is considered to be the breadth component of an undergraduate education, the major is commonly deemed the depth aspect. For example, majoring in English is excellent preparation for a law degree. Choice of major has a significant impact on employment prospects and lifetime earnings.

== Discourse and disagreement ==
Through its development, scholars, academics, and educators have disagreed on the purpose and nature of the undergraduate major. Generally, proponents of the major and departmental system "argue that they enable an academic community to foster the development, conservation and diffusion of knowledge." In contrast, critics "claim that they promote intellectual tribalism, where specialization receives favor over the mastery of multiple epistemologies, where broader values of liberal learning and of campus unity are lost, and where innovation is inhibited due to parochial opposition to new sub-specialties and research methods."

== Difference from academic concentration ==
In many universities, an academic concentration is a focus within a specific academic major, that is a field of study within a specific academic major. For example, interdisciplinary programs in humanities or social sciences will require a student to pick a specific academic concentration as a focus within their academic major, such as an academic major in Interdisciplinary Humanities with an academic concentration in Film or an academic major in Interdisciplinary Social Sciences with an academic concentration in Geography. At several art schools and liberal arts colleges, an academic concentration serves a similar function to an academic minor at other universities, that is an academic discipline outside of the student's academic major in which they take a number of classes. At Brown University and Harvard University, however, the term "concentration" refers simply to the major field.

At the doctoral studies level, an academic major or major field refers to a student's primary focus within their degree program while a minor or minor field refers to their secondary focus. For example, a doctoral student studying history might pursue their degree in history with a major field in war and society and a minor field in postcolonial studies.

== Impacted majors ==
An impacted major is a major for which more students apply for than the school can accommodate, a classic example of demand exceeding supply. When that occurs, the major becomes "impacted" and so is susceptible to higher standards of admission.

For example, suppose that a school has minimum requirements are SATs of 1100 and a GPA of 3.0. If a person applies to an impacted major, the school can raise the minimum requirements as much as needed to weed out the students that it is unable to accommodate. Because of this, some students may opt to apply to a school as "Undeclared". If in the above example the school implements requirements of SATs of 1300 and a GPA of 3.4 for the impacted major, a student may find it better to apply as "Undeclared" if they meet only the minimum requirements. However, many universities, such as the University of California, Berkeley, may in turn present more difficult requirements (such as a GPA requirement in certain prerequisite classes) to enter an impacted major even once accepted to the university overall.

== Terminology and international differences ==
Region	Term for Major	Degree Structure
United States / Canada	Major	4 years; includes General Education.
United Kingdom / Ireland	Course / Subject	3 years; highly specialized from day one.
Australia / New Zealand	Major / Specialisation	3 years; allows for "double majors" or "minors."
Europe (Bologna Process)	Field of Study / Programme	3 years (Bachelor's); strictly focused on one area.

== See also ==
- Academic minor
- British undergraduate degree classification
- Curriculum
- Double degree
- Higher education
- Joint honours degree
