= Graduate School of Law and Faculty of Law, Kyoto University =

School of law at Kyoto university

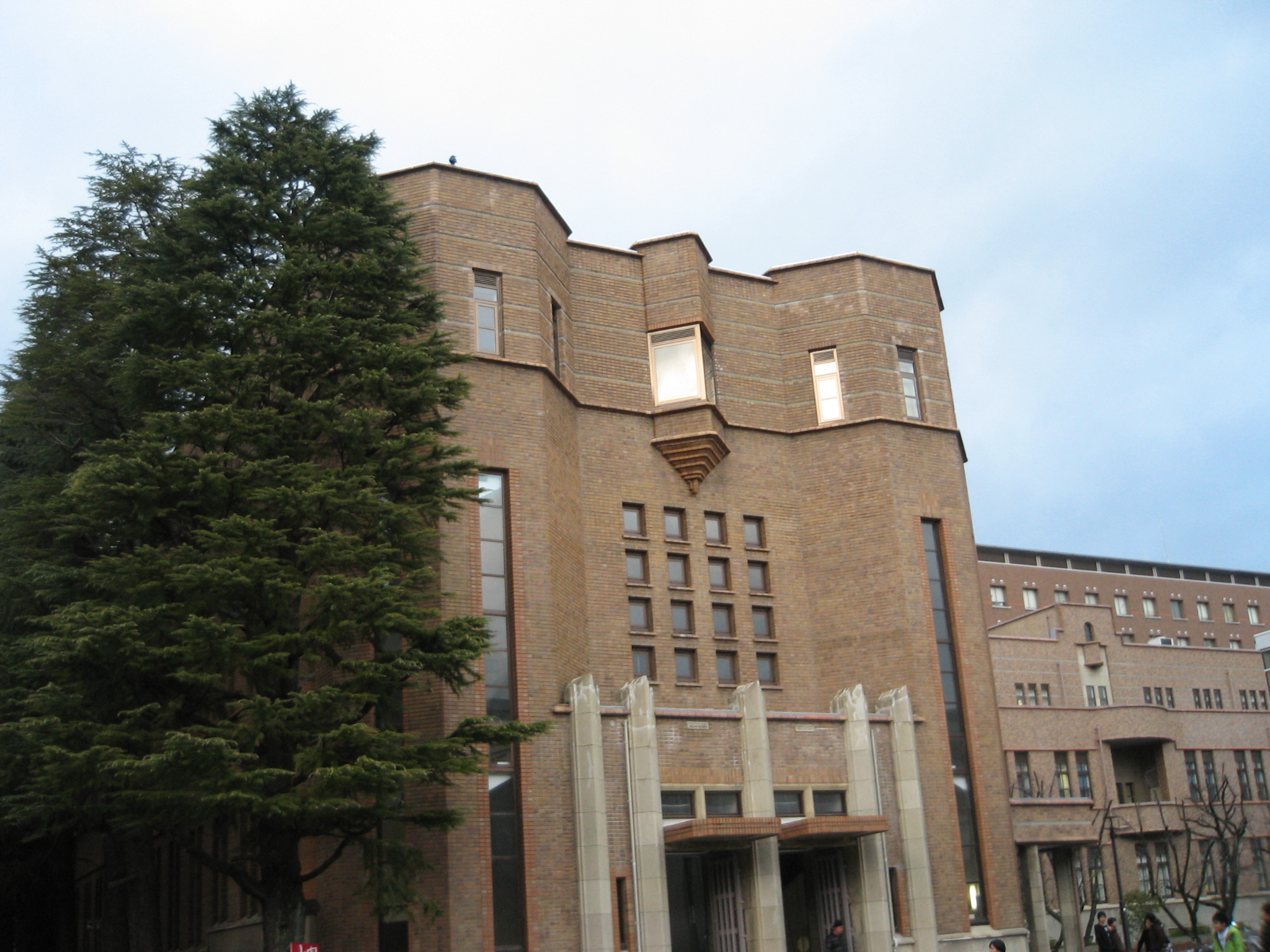
Law and Economics Building, Kyoto University

Graduate School of Law and Faculty of Law(京都大学大学院法学研究科・法学部) is one of the schools at Kyoto University. The Faculty (Undergraduate) and the Graduate School operate as one.

Founded in 1899 as the College of Law (法科大学) at Kyoto Imperial University, it specializes in Law and Politics. In 1919, the college was renamed the Faculty of Law (法学部) and departments related to economics are separated as Faculty of Economics.

According to the QS World University Rankings by Subject 2022, Kyoto University is ranked 2nd in Law and Legal Studies and 3rd in Law and Politics in Japan.

== Organization ==
=== Faculty of Law ===
Faculty of Law (法学部) offers academic LL.B. degree in Law and Politics.

=== Graduate School of Law ===
Graduate School of Law (法学研究科) has two programs; an academic program in Law and Politics, and law school program.

Legal and Political Studies Program (法政理論専攻) offers LL.M. (academic) and LL.D. (Ph.D.) degrees in Law and Politics.

Law School (法科大学院 or 法曹養成専攻) offers the J.D. degree.

== Notable alumni ==
- Fumimaro Konoe (LLB) - 38th and 39th Prime Minister of Japan
- Hayato Ikeda (LLB) - 58th, 59th and 60th Prime Minister of Japan
- Frank Hsieh (M.Jur. and ABD) - Taiwanese politician

== See also ==
- School of Government, Kyoto University (ja)
