= Kyoto University =

National university in Kyoto, Japan

Coordinates: 35°01′34″N 135°46′51″E

- 京都大学 (Japanese)
- Motto: 自由の学風
- Motto in English: "Freedom of academic culture"
- Type: Public (national)
- Established: June 18, 1897; 129 years ago
- Affiliations: Kansai Big Six, ASAIHL
- President: Nagahiro Minato
- Faculty: 4,062 (teaching staff)
- Administrative staff: 3,658 (total staff)
- Students: 22,426
- Undergraduates: 12,852
- Postgraduates: 9,574
- Location: Kyoto, Kyoto, Japan
- Campus: Urban, 135 ha (333 acres)
- Athletics: 48 varsity teams
- Colors: Navy blue
- Nickname: Kyodai
- Website: www.kyoto-u.ac.jp/ja

Kyoto University (京都大学, Kyōto daigaku), or KyotoU (京大, Kyōdai), is a national research university in Kyoto, Japan. Founded in 1897, it is one of the former Imperial Universities and the second oldest university in Japan.

The university has ten undergraduate faculties, eighteen graduate schools, and thirteen research institutes. The university's educational and research activities are centred in its three main campuses in Kyoto: Yoshida, Uji and Katsura. The Kyoto University Library Network, consisting of more than 40 libraries spread across its campuses, has a collection of more than 7.49 million books, making it the second largest university library in the country. In addition to these campuses, the university owns facilities and lands for educational and research purposes around the country.

As of 2024, Kyoto University counts two prime ministers of Japan amongst its alumni. Additionally, three prime ministers of Japan attended the Third Higher School, a university preparatory school that merged into KyotoU in 1951. There have been 21 Nobel Prize laureates, 2 Fields Medalists, 1 Abel Prize winner, 1 Gauss Prize winner, and 5 Lasker Award recipients affiliated with KyotoU either as alumni or faculty members.

== History ==
=== Founding ===
Kyoto University can trace its roots back to the Chemistry School (舎密局, Seimi-kyoku), an institution for Chemistry and Physics founded in Osaka in 1869. Seimi is a Japanese transcription of the Dutch word chemie, meaning chemistry. In 1894, this institution was replaced by the Third Higher School, which was a specialised boys' boarding school. Back then, the country had only one university, the Imperial University (today's University of Tokyo), and the call for the nation's second university in the Kansai region was gaining momentum. However, due to financial reasons, the government was reluctant to do so.

The situation changed when the aristocratic politician Saionji Kinmochi, who was from a prominent kuge family in Kyoto, suggested the founding of the nation's second university using war reparations from the First Sino-Japanese War. This plan was edicted accordingly in 1896, and Kyoto Imperial University (京都帝國大學, Kyōto-teikoku-daigaku) was established on June 18, 1897, as the second university in the country. The University started using Third Higher School's buildings, and the higher school moved to a patch of land across the street, where the southern section of the Yoshida Campus stands today. The Imperial University in Tokyo was renamed Tokyo Imperial University following the founding of its counterpart in Kyoto.

It started teaching with the College of Science and Engineering in the year of its foundation, which was followed by the establishment of the College of Law in 1898. Other faculties and colleges were established during its first decade as a university. The low rates of success of its graduates in the Higher Civil Service Examinations led to the Chief Commercial Law Professor Yoshihito Takane (高根義人) adopting a distinct style of teaching, which he called the 'German way of cherishing the freedom of research, teaching, and learning'. He is said to be the originator of the current motto 'freedom of academic culture (自由の学風, Jiyū no Gakufū)'.

=== Post-war period ===
The Allied Occupation Period following Japan's defeat in the Second World War saw a radical reform in the country's educational system, and Kyoto University was not immune from it. Along with other Imperial Universities, Kyoto Imperial University dropped the word 'imperial' from its name and came to be known as Kyoto University (京都大学, Kyōto daigaku) in October 1947. In May 1949, as a result of the American-led reform, former Imperial Universities merged with higher schools and became four-year universities as they are today. Kyoto University merged with the Third Higher School, which had been coexisting with the university since its founding as a university-preparatory boys' boarding school. The now-integrated higher school became the College of Liberal Arts (教養部, Kyōyō-bu) within the university in September 1949, and came to be in charge of equipping all first-year undergraduates with general knowledge such as mathematics and foreign languages. The college was replaced by the Faculty of Integrated Human Studies (総合人間学部, Sōgō-ningen-gakubu) in 1992.

Kyoto University has been incorporated as a national university corporation along with all the other national universities, gaining a greater independence from the MEXT.

== Campuses ==
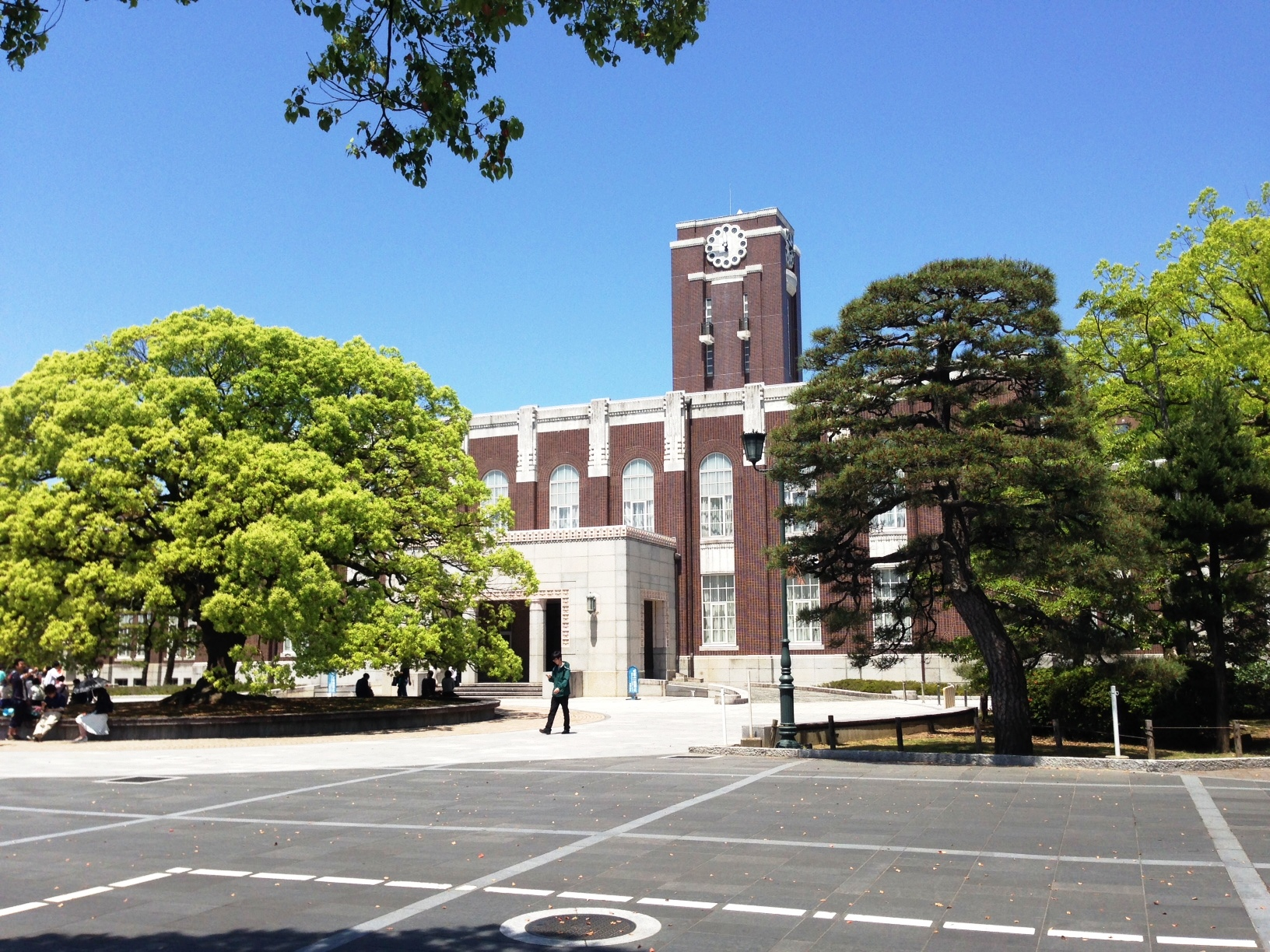
The Clocktower

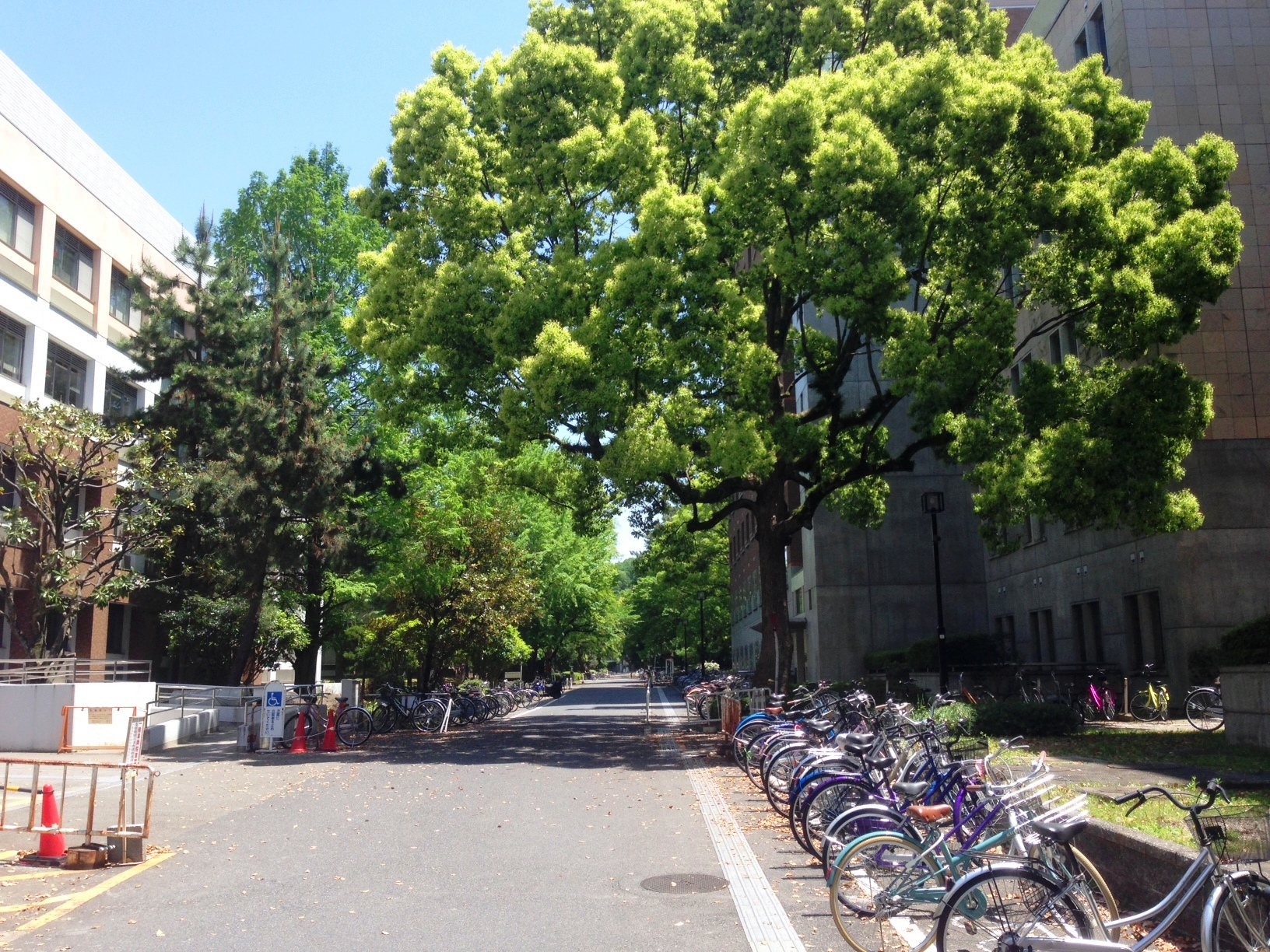
Yoshida Campus headquarters

Kyoto University is organised across three main campuses: Yoshida, Uji, and Katsura, each playing a distinct role in the university's academic and research activities.

Situated in Sakyo, Kyoto, the Yoshida Campus is the oldest and serves as the university's central hub. This campus is characterised by its mix of architectural styles, from historic brick buildings such as the Clock Tower Centennial Hall to modern research facilities. It encapsulates the university's history and is subdivided into seven areas, including the North Campus and the Yoshida-South Campus, which used to be occupied by the Third Higher School.

The Uji Campus, located in Uji, Kyoto, was formerly occupied by the Imperial Japanese Army. The university acquired it just after its reorganisation into its current form, in 1949. Today, it houses several research institutes and centres focusing on natural sciences and energy. Along with its large laboratories, Uji Campus is recognised for its greenery and serene environment.

The Katsura Campus, in Nishikyo, Kyoto, is recognised as a 'Techno-science Hill' for its forward-looking approach to research and education in engineering and informatics. Established in October 2003, Katsura aims to pioneer new knowledge domains in the 21st century. This campus is organised into four sections, each dedicated to different facets of technological and scientific exploration.

== Organization ==
Kyoto University is organised into 10 undergraduate faculties and 19 graduate schools. The president of the university is Nagahiro Minato, who assumed the office in October 2020 and expected to serve until September 2026.

As of 1 May 2023, the university's student body consists of 13,038 undergraduates and 9,577 postgraduates. Apart from audit students and research students, there are 2,249 international students.

=== Faculties ===
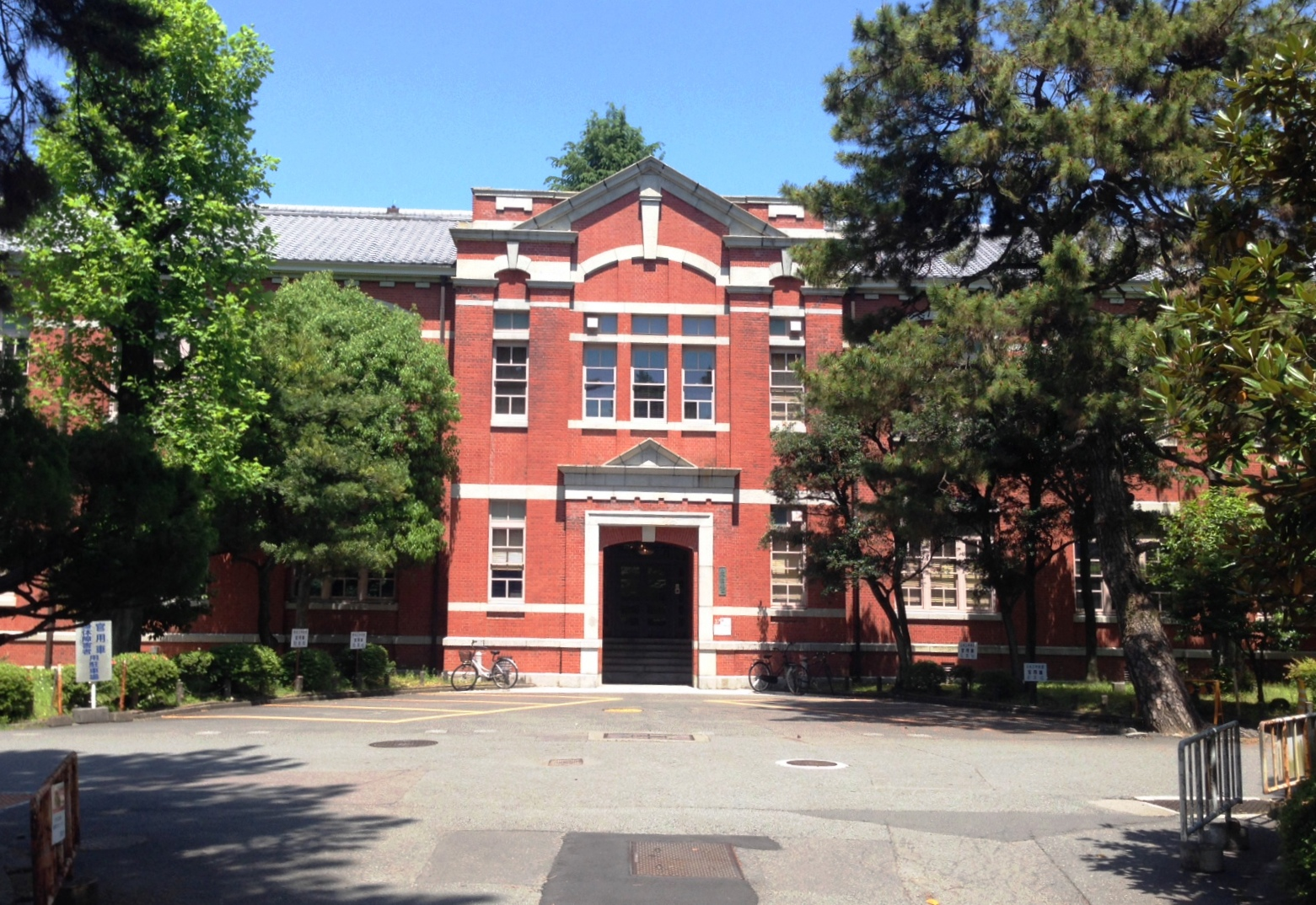
Faculty of Engineering Civil Engineering Classroom Main Building (Yoshida Campus)

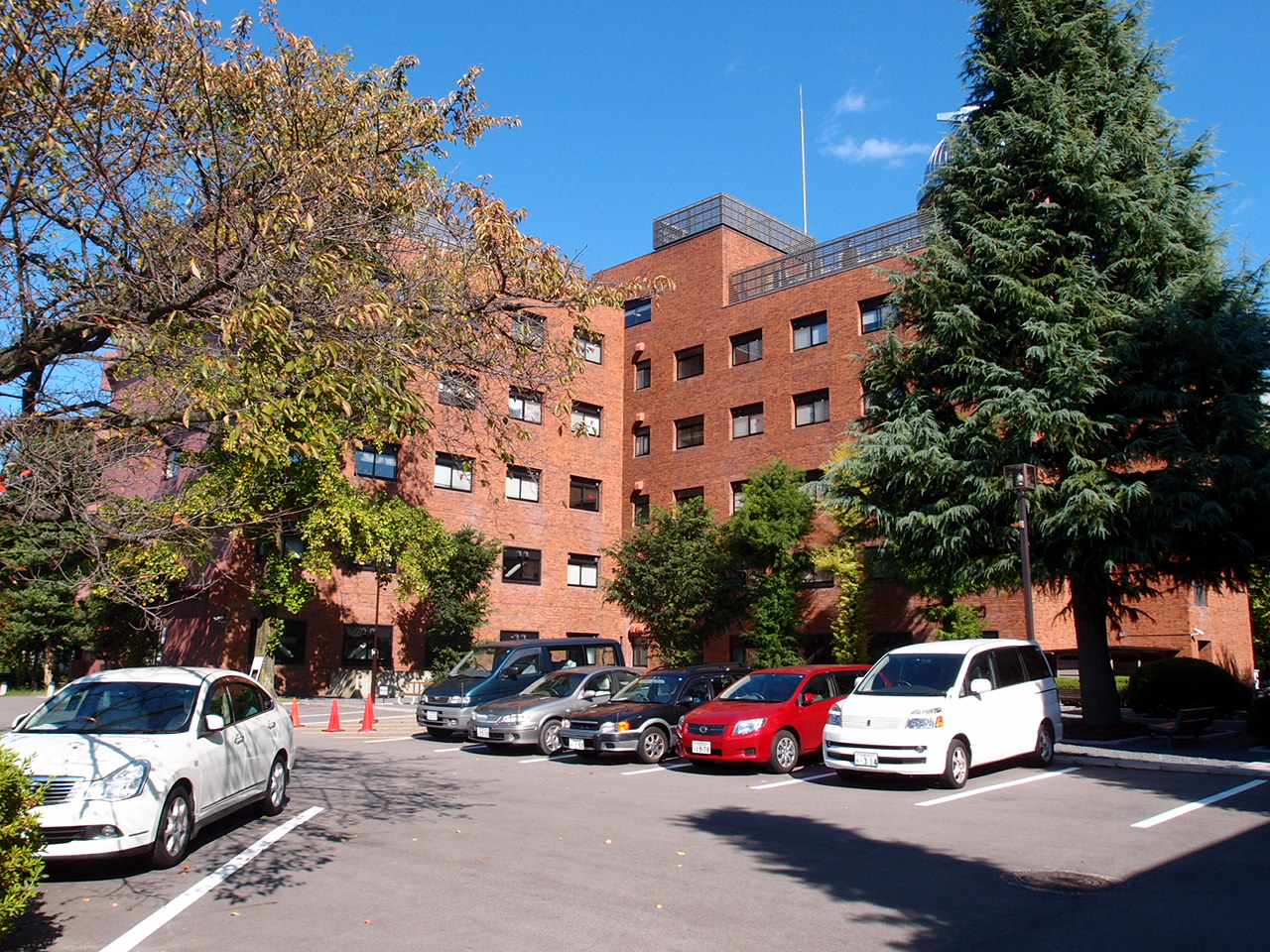
Graduate School of Science Building No. 4 (Yoshida Campus)

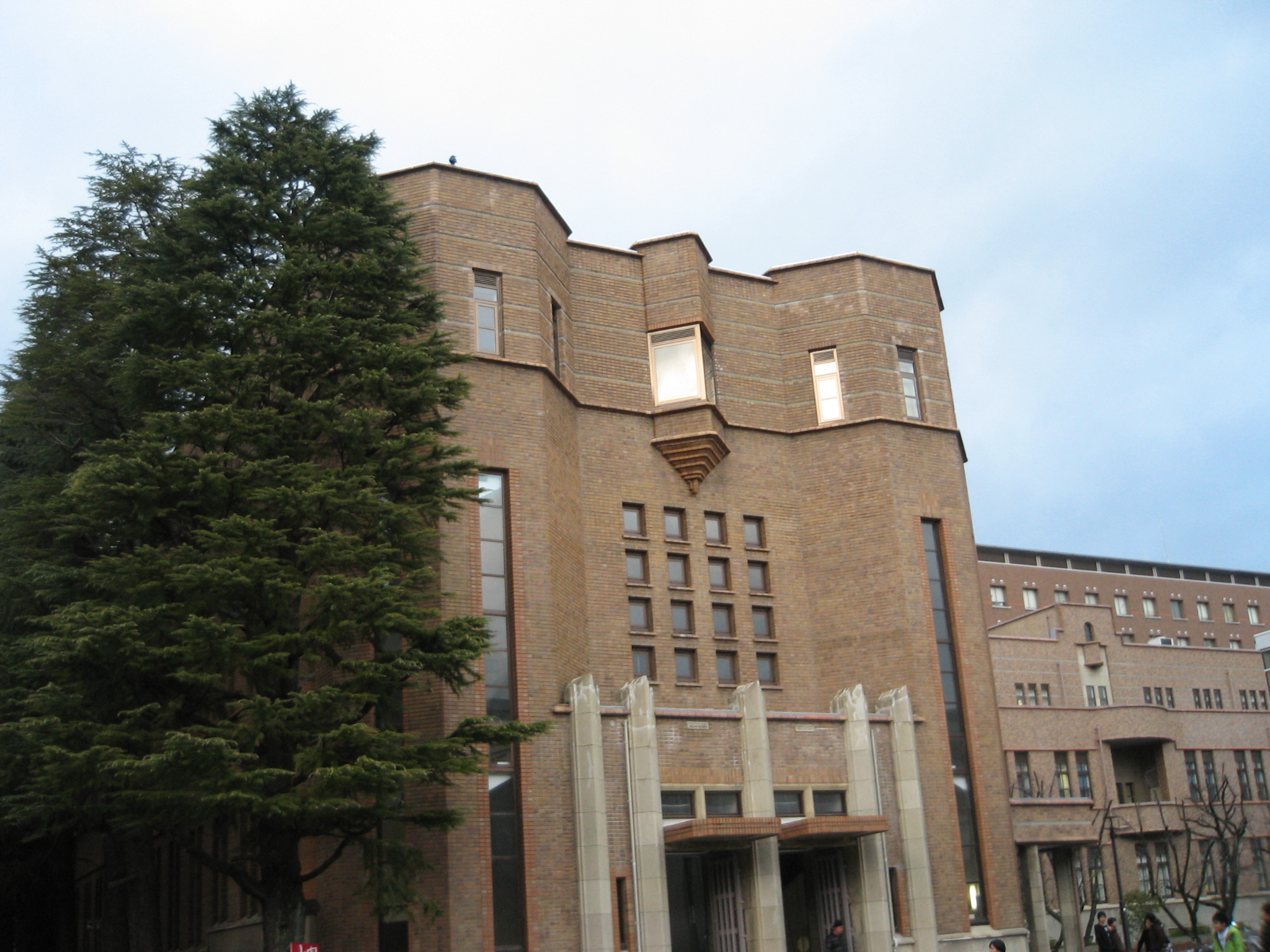
Faculty of Law and Economics Main Building (Yoshida Campus)

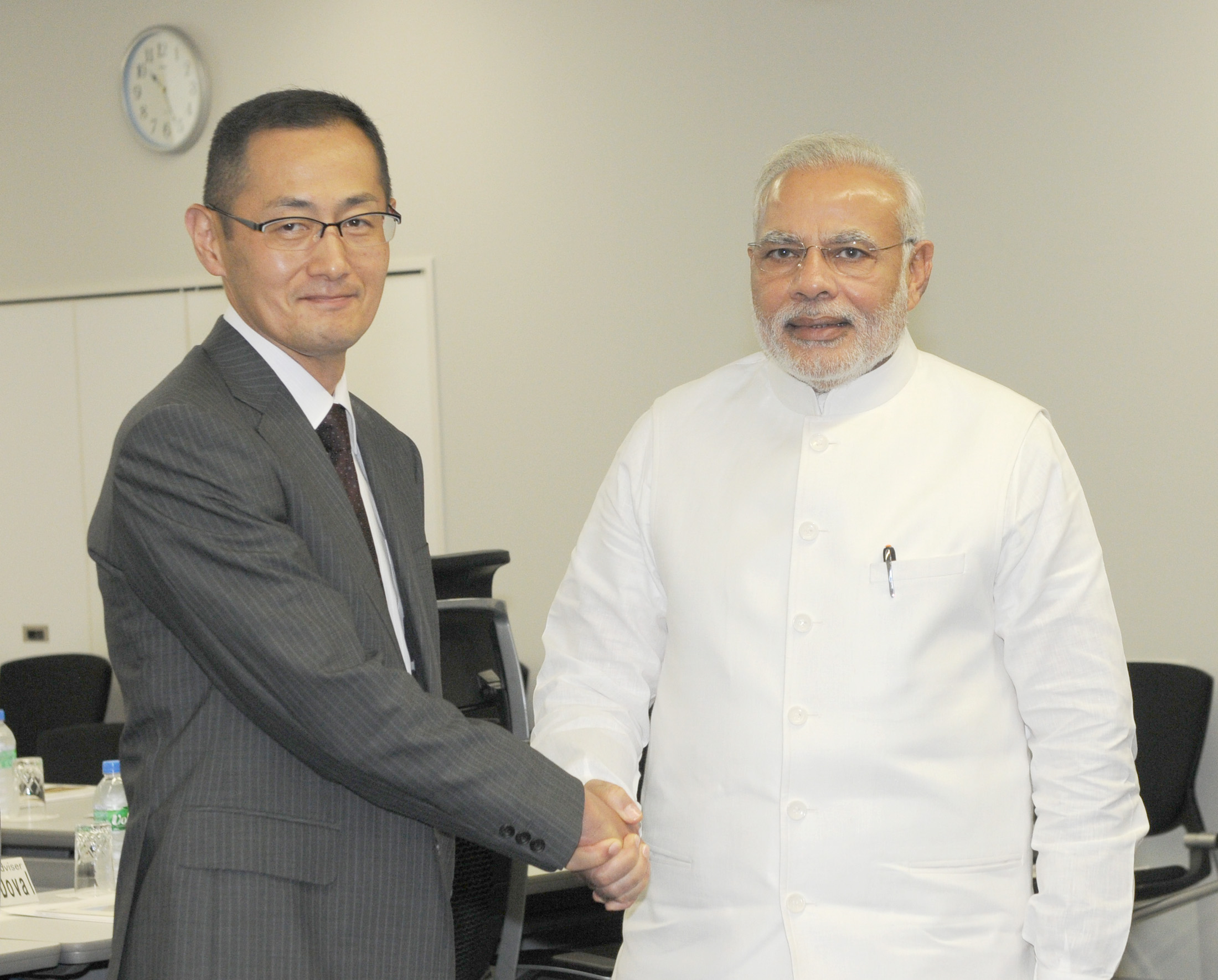
PM Modi during a visit to the stem cell research centre at Kyoto University

Kyoto University has 10 faculties.

- Faculty of Integrated Human Studies
- Faculty of Letters
- Faculty of Education
- Faculty of Law
- Faculty of Economics
- Faculty of Science
- Faculty of Medicine
- Faculty of Pharmaceutical Sciences
- Faculty of Engineering
- Faculty of Agriculture

=== Graduate schools ===
Kyoto University has 19 graduate schools.

==== Academic ====
- Graduate School of Letters
- Graduate School of Education
- Graduate School of Law
- Graduate School of Economics
- Graduate School of Science
- Graduate School of Medicine
- Graduate School of Pharmaceutical Sciences
- Graduate School of Engineering
- Graduate School of Agriculture
- Graduate School of Human and Environmental Studies
- Graduate School of Energy Science
- Graduate School of Asian and African Area Studies
- Graduate School of Informatics
- Graduate School of Biostudies
- Graduate School of Global Environmental Studies

==== Professional ====
- School of Government
- Graduate School of Management
- Kyoto University Law School
- Kyoto University School of Public Health

==== Notable research institutes and facilities ====
- Yukawa Institute for Theoretical Physics
- Research Institute for Mathematical Sciences
- Primate Research Institute
- Kosobe Conservatory
- Seto Marine Biological Laboratory

== International Programmes ==
Kyoto University offers a range of international programmes aimed at both its students and international students seeking to study there, across undergraduate and postgraduate levels.

=== Undergraduate Programmes ===
Kyoto University provides undergraduate degrees available for international students across all 10 faculties, with many general education modules available in English to cater to the needs of international students. Department-specific subjects are delivered primarily in Japanese with the exception of the Undergraduate International Course Program of Civil Engineering, which is a fully English-taught program.

The Kyoto University International Undergraduate Program (Kyoto iUP) is another notable initiative, offering a comprehensive 4.5-year program that consists of a six-month preparatory course (mainly intensive lessons of the Japanese language) followed by a four-year undergraduate degree program. This program is designed for students with no prior Japanese language proficiency and offers various financial support options, including admission/tuition fee waivers and monthly scholarships. Students are expected to acquire sufficient Japanese proficiency to attend specialised lectures within the first two-and-a-half years of the program, then go on to pursue advanced studies in their final two years. The acceptance rate was 5.9% for the 2024 intake.

=== Graduate Programmes ===
At the graduate level, Kyoto University has 18 Graduate Schools offering master's, doctoral, and professional degree programmes, all of which are available for international students. International students are well-represented, with over 2,000 international students enrolled. The university facilitates a conducive learning environment with English-taught programmes, Japanese language education, and scholarships tailored to international students' needs.

== Academic rankings and reputation ==
University rankings
Global
THE	General	61
THE Reputation	General	24
QS	General	57
ARWU	Research	46
Nature Index Academic	Research	42

Regional
THE Asia (Asia version)	General	13
QS Asia (Asia version)	General	23
ARWU Asia	Research	2

National

Kyoto University maintains a high academic reputation, and is regarded as one of the nation's top two universities, along with the University of Tokyo.

Times Higher Education World University Rankings ranked Kyoto University 55th in the world in 2023 (2nd in Japan). QS World University Rankings ranked Kyoto University 50th in the world in 2024 (2nd in Japan). The Times Higher Education World Reputation Rankings 2022 ranked Kyoto University 26th in the world (2nd in Japan). The Academic Ranking of World Universities ranked Kyoto University 39th in the world in 2023 (2nd in Japan).

In the Nature index 2023 annual table, Kyoto University was ranked 44th for its output in selected journals in the fields of natural sciences and Health Sciences research, among all leading research institutions in the world (2nd in Japan).

=== Subject rankings ===
QS World University Rankings by Subject 2024
Subject	Global	National
Arts & Humanities	▲62	2
Linguistics	▲ =74	2
Theology, Divinity and Religious Studies	51–100	2
Archaeology	▼51–100	2
Architecture and Built Environment	51–100	3
Art and Design	151–200	5–6
Classics and Ancient History	▲20	1
English Language and Literature	▲ =80	2
History	▲24	2
Modern Languages	▲24	2
Philosophy	51–100	1–2
Engineering and Technology	▲ =62	3
Engineering – Chemical	▼47	2
Engineering – Civil and Structural	51–100	2–3
Computer Science and Information Systems	▲ =116	3
Data Science and Artificial Intelligence	51–70	1
Engineering – Electrical and Electronic	▲ =81	3
Engineering – Petroleum	=26	2
Engineering – Mechanical	▲78	▲3
Engineering – Mineral and Mining	51–70	1–2
Life Sciences & Medicine	▲61	2
Agriculture and Forestry	▼ =52	▲2
Anatomy and Physiology	▲39	2
Biological Sciences	▼50	2
Medicine	▼65	2
Pharmacy and Pharmacology	▲ =76	2
Psychology	101–150	2
Natural Sciences	▼31	2
Chemistry	▲27	2
Earth and Marine Sciences	51–100	2
Environmental Sciences	▲78	2
Geography	▼34	2
Geology	51–100	2
Geophysics	51–100	2
Materials Sciences	▲48	▲3
Mathematics	▼53	2
Physics and Astronomy	▲26	2
Social Sciences & Management	▲ =79	2
Accounting and Finance	151–200	3–6
Anthropology	▼ =43	2
Business and Management Studies	151–200	3–5
Communication and Media Studies	151–200	2–3
Development Studies	51–100	2–3
Economics and Econometrics	▲ =77	2
Education and Training	▲101–150	2
Law and Legal Studies	▲ =66	2
Politics	▲51–100	▲2–3
Social Policy and Administration	51–100	2
Sociology	▲53	2
Sports–Related Subjects	51–100	▼2–4
Statistics and Operational Research	51–100	2–3

THE World University Rankings by Subject 2024
Subject	Global	National
Arts & humanities	101–125	2
Business & economics	▲78	2
Clinical & health	▼48	2
Computer science	▲69	2
Education	▼ =57	2
Engineering	▲47	2
Life sciences	▲40	2
Physical sciences	▲54	2
Psychology	▲83	2
Social sciences	▲ =75	2

ARWU Global Ranking of Academic Subjects 2023
Subject	Global	National
Natural Sciences
Mathematics	▼51–75	1–2
Physics	▼44	3
Chemistry	▼51–75	2
Earth Sciences	101–150	2–4
Ecology	201–300	1–2
Oceanography	151–200	4
Atmospheric Science	201–300	▲4–6
Engineering
Mechanical Engineering	▼301–400	▼5–7
Electrical & Electronic Engineering	301–400	▲4–8
Biomedical Engineering	▼101–150	1–2
Computer Science & Engineering	301–400	▼5–6
Civil Engineering	▼201–300	2–6
Chemical Engineering	201–300	2–5
Materials Science & Engineering	▼151–200	3–5
Nanoscience & Nanotechnology	201–300	▲2–4
Energy Science & Engineering	▼151–200	2–5
Environmental Science & Engineering	201–300	▲2–3
Biotechnology	201–300	▼3–4
Marine/Ocean Engineering	▲37	1
Metallurgical Engineering	▲40	▲2
Life Sciences
Biological Sciences	▲34	▼3
Human Biological Sciences	▼15	1
Agricultural Sciences	▼301–400	▲1
Medical Sciences
Clinical Medicine	▼301–400	▼2–3
Public Health	▼301–400	▼2–4
Medical Technology	▼301–400	1–6
Social Sciences
Economics	301–400	2–4
Statistics	151–200	2
Education	301–400	1
Psychology	301–400	2

=== Popularity and selectivity ===
Kyoto University is one of the most selective universities in Japan. The selectivity for its undergraduate degrees is usually regarded as among the top two, along with the University of Tokyo.

== Athletics ==
Kyoto University competes in 48 sports. The university is a member of the Kansai Big Six Baseball League.

=== Controversy ===
Members of the university's American football team, the Kyoto University Gangsters, were arrested in 2006 for gang rape, which had been recently added to the Penal Code in January 2005 following the Super Free rape controversy. The three students had forced a female university student to drink liquor to the point of unconsciousness, at which point they gang-raped her. They were all convicted.

== Notable people ==
Of the twenty-one Nobel Prize winners who have been affiliated with Kyoto University in some way, eight attended the university as undergraduate students. Fields Medal winners Heisuke Hironaka (1970) and Shigefumi Mori (1990) and one Carl Friedrich Gauss Prize winner Kiyosi Itô are also affiliated with the university.

Alumni or faculty of Kyoto University that received the Nobel Prize

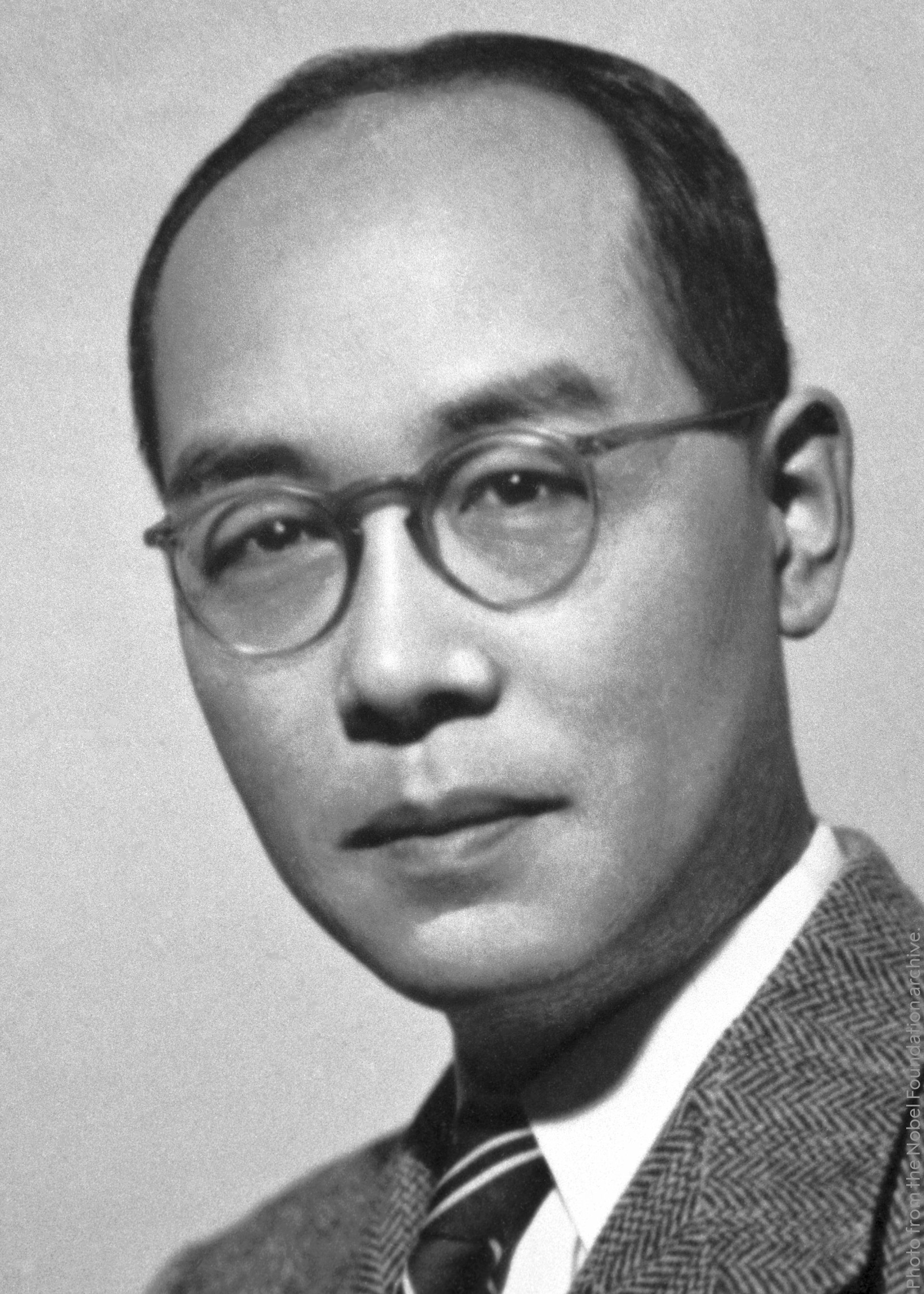
Hideki Yukawa, Physics, 1949

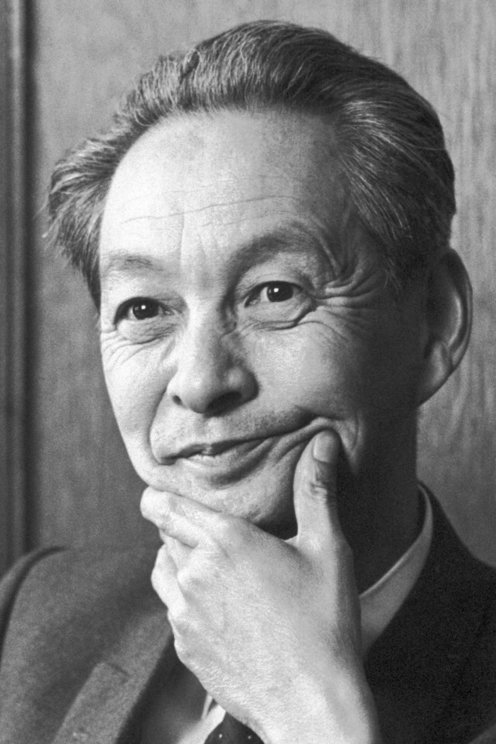
Shinichiro Tomonaga, Physics, 1965

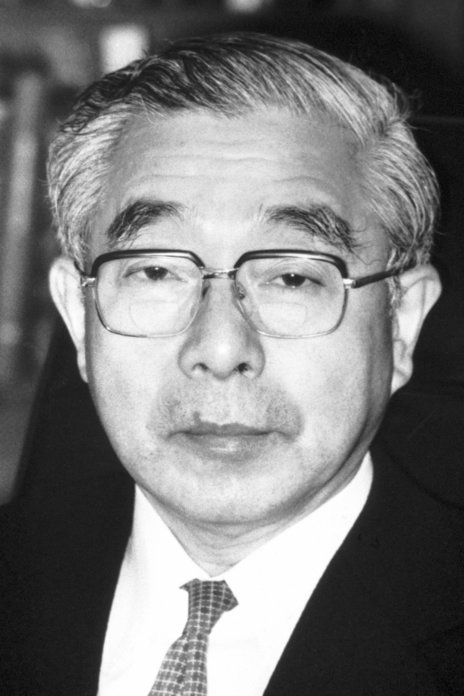
Kenichi Fukui, Chemistry, 1981

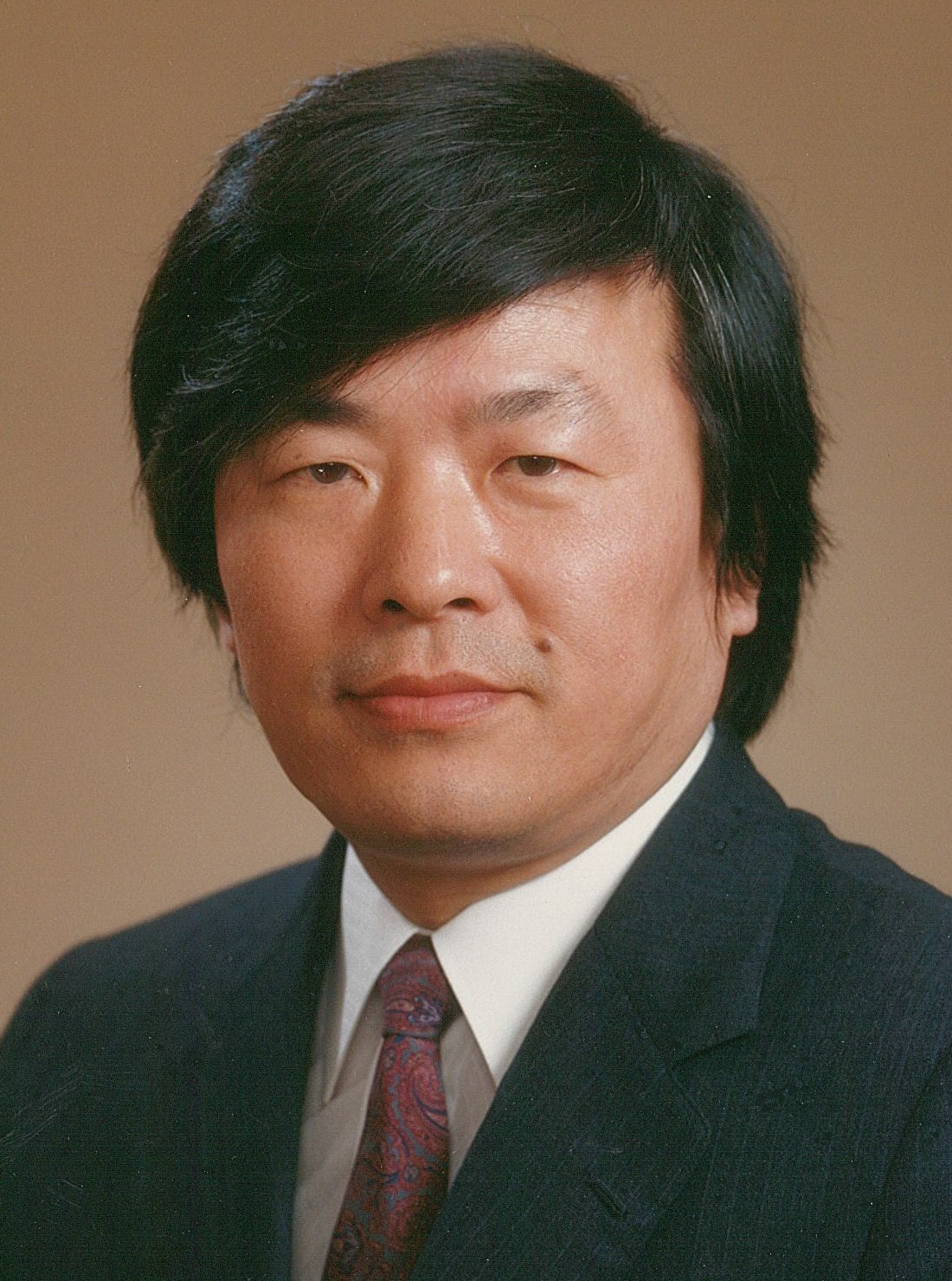
Susumu Tonegawa, Physiology or Medicine, 1987

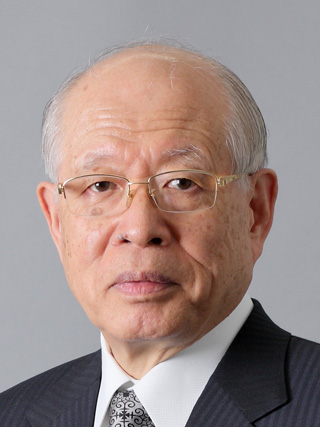
Ryōji Noyori, Chemistry, 2001

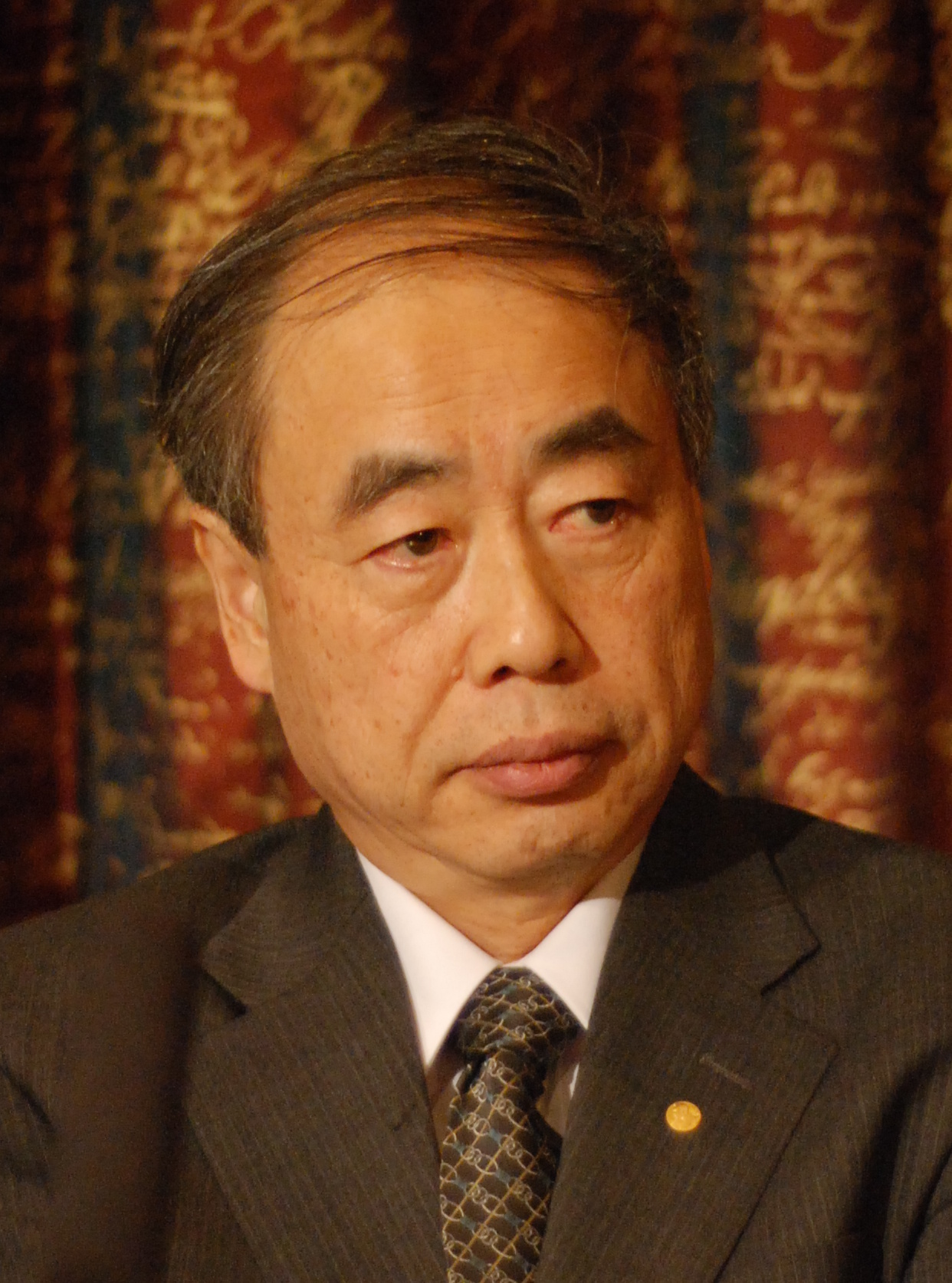
Makoto Kobayashi, Physics, 2008

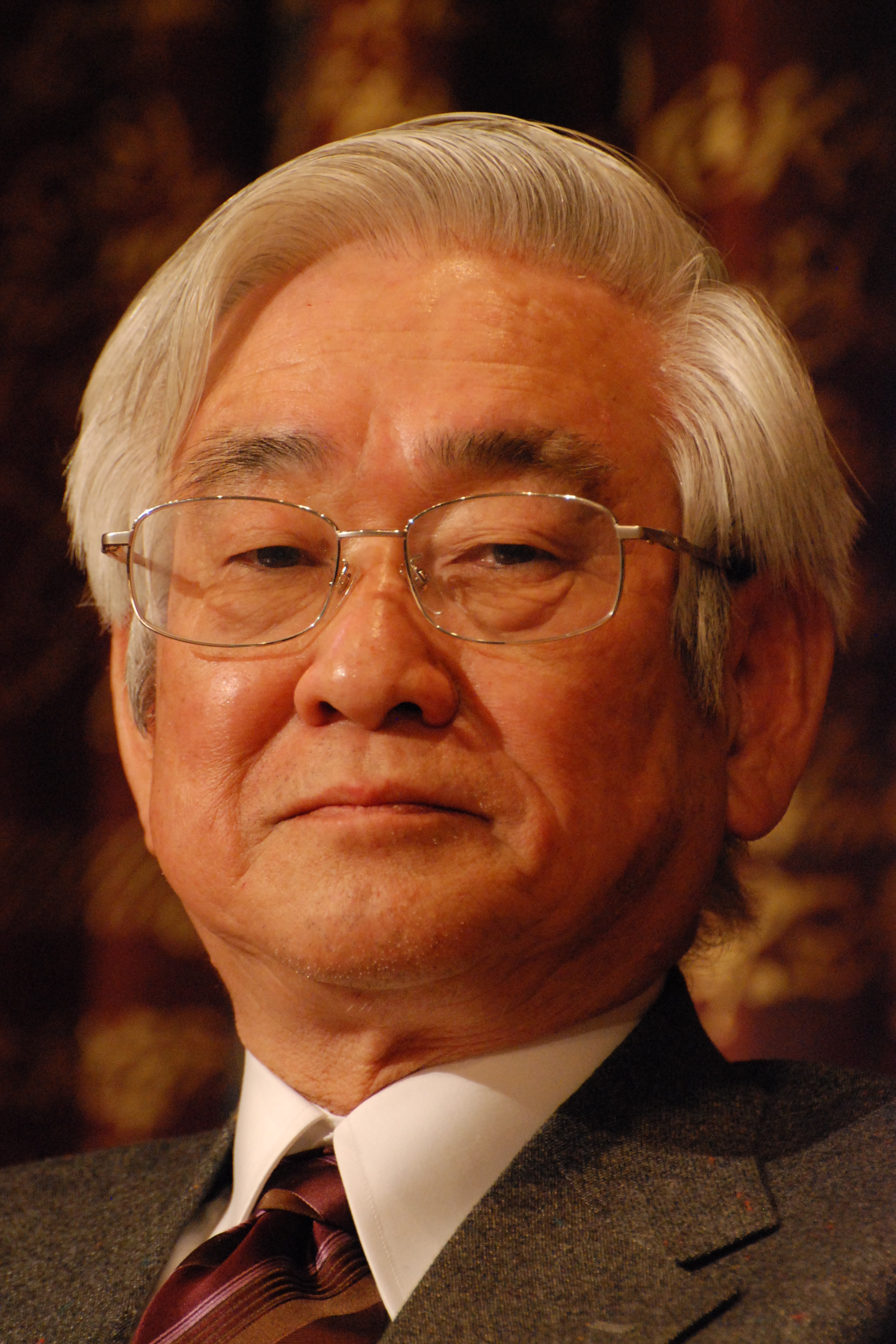
Toshihide Maskawa, Physics, 2008

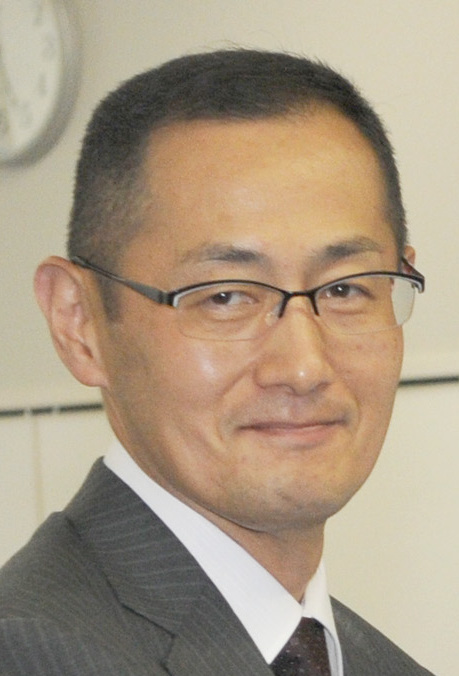
Shinya Yamanaka, Physiology or Medicine, 2012

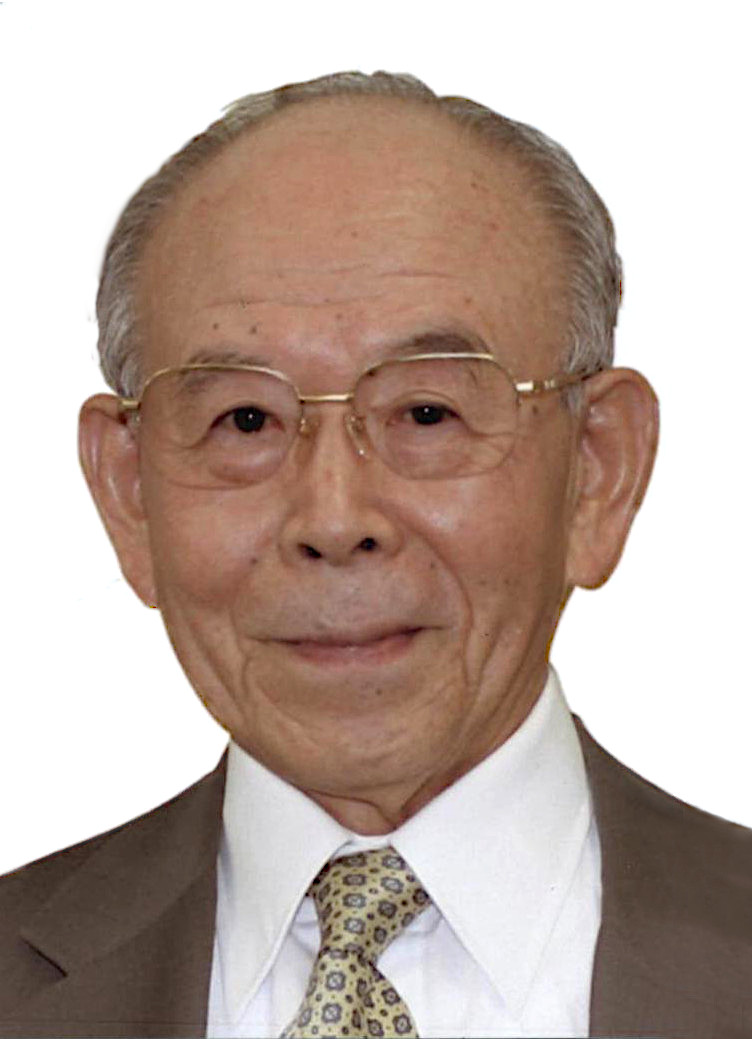
Isamu Akasaki, Physics, 2014

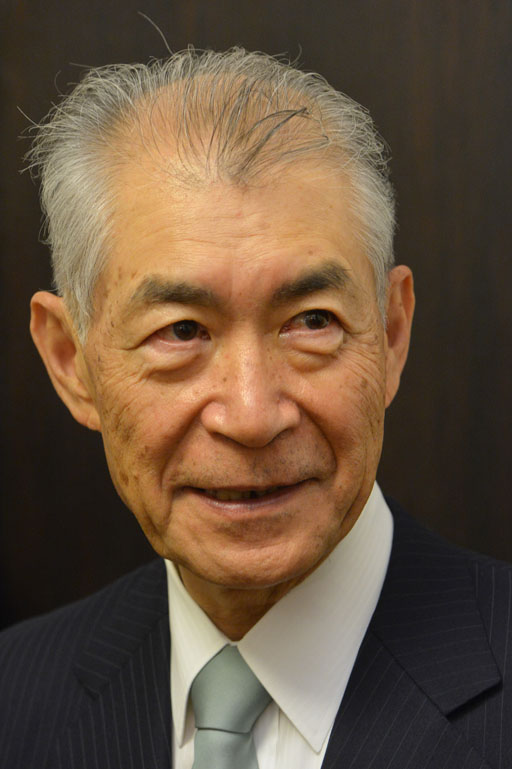
Tasuku Honjo, Physiology or Medicine, 2018

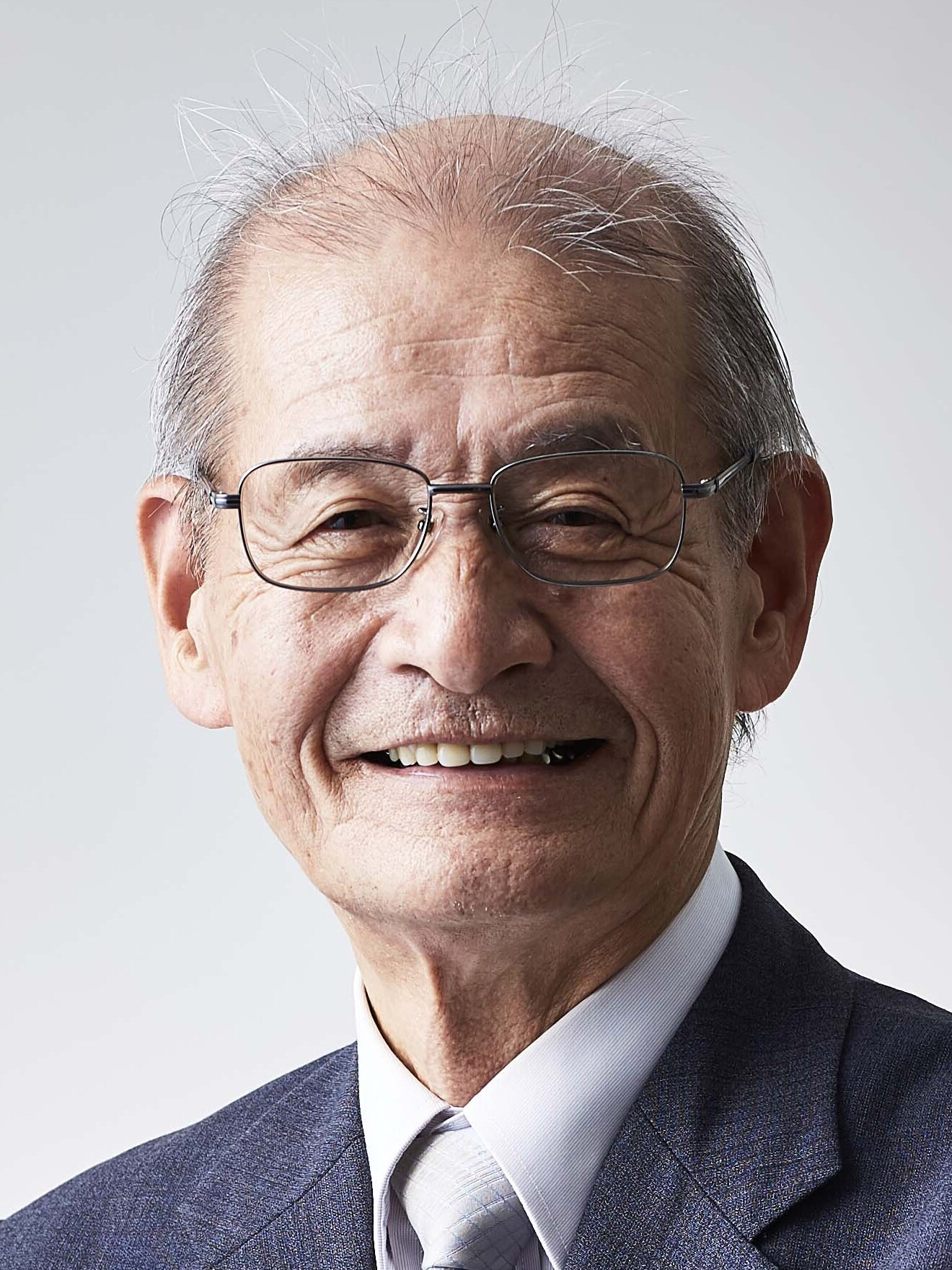
Akira Yoshino, Chemistry, 2019

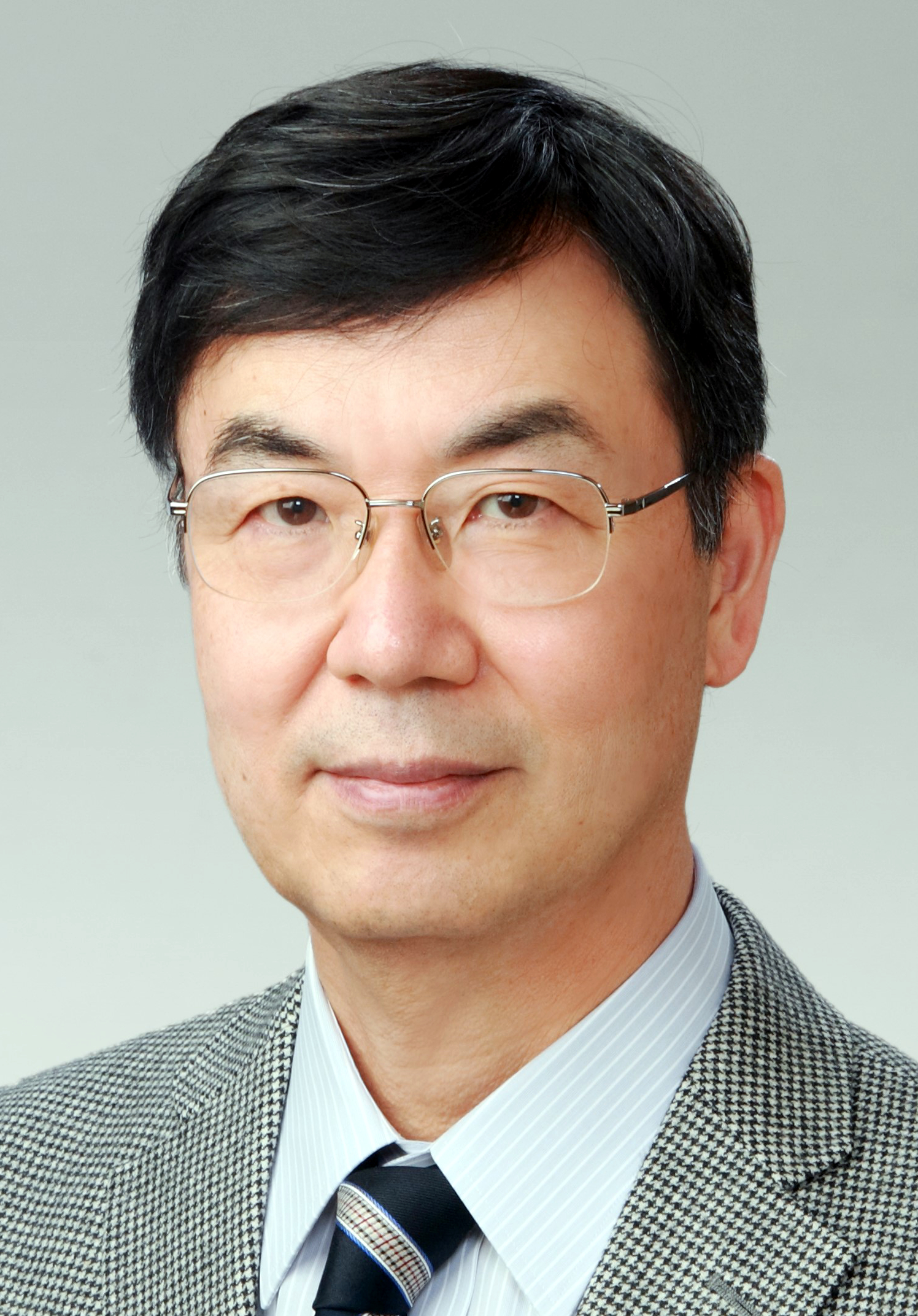
Shimon Sakaguchi, Physiology or Medicine, 2025

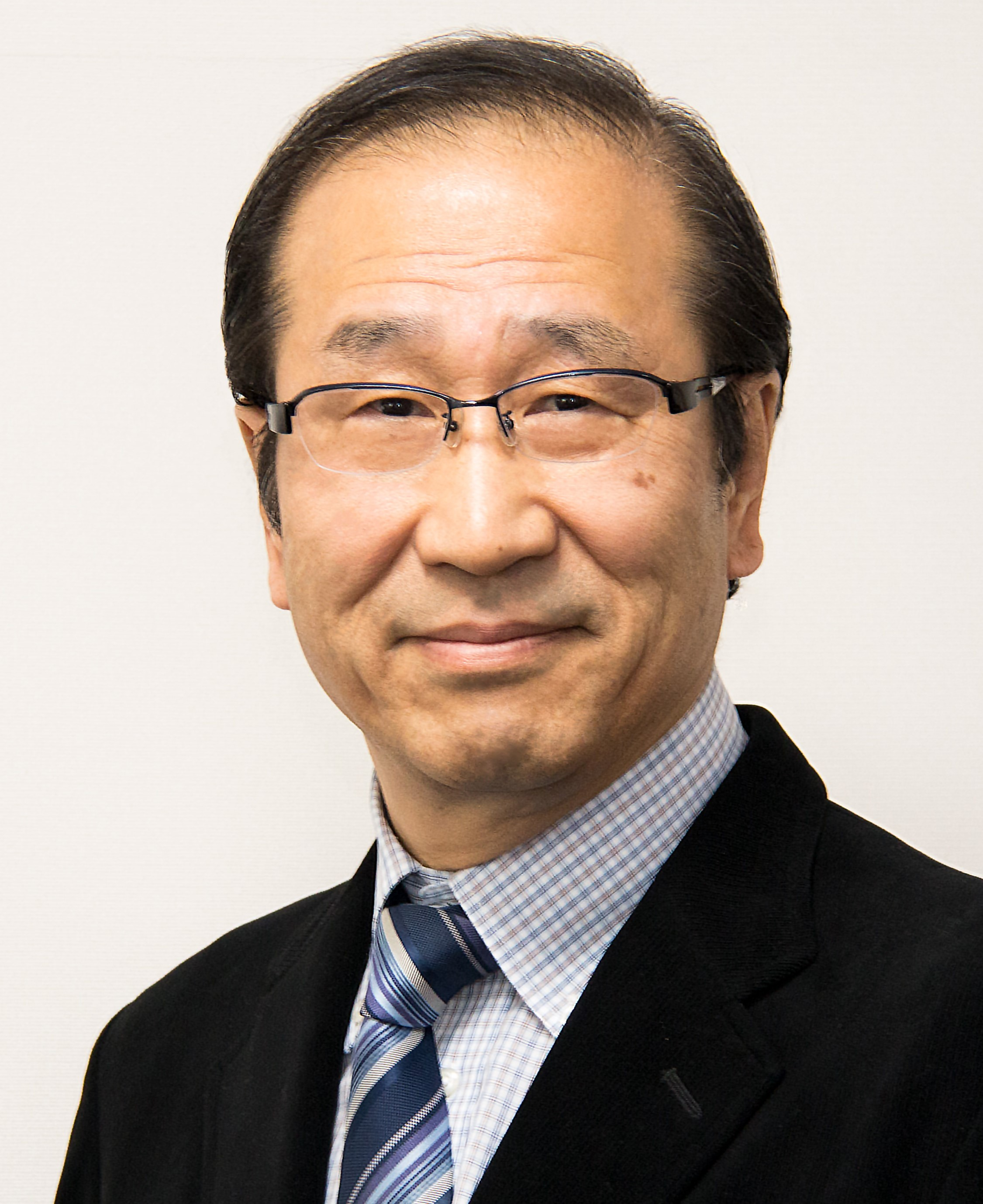
Susumu Kitagawa, Chemistry, 2025
Japanese Prime Ministers who attended Kyoto University

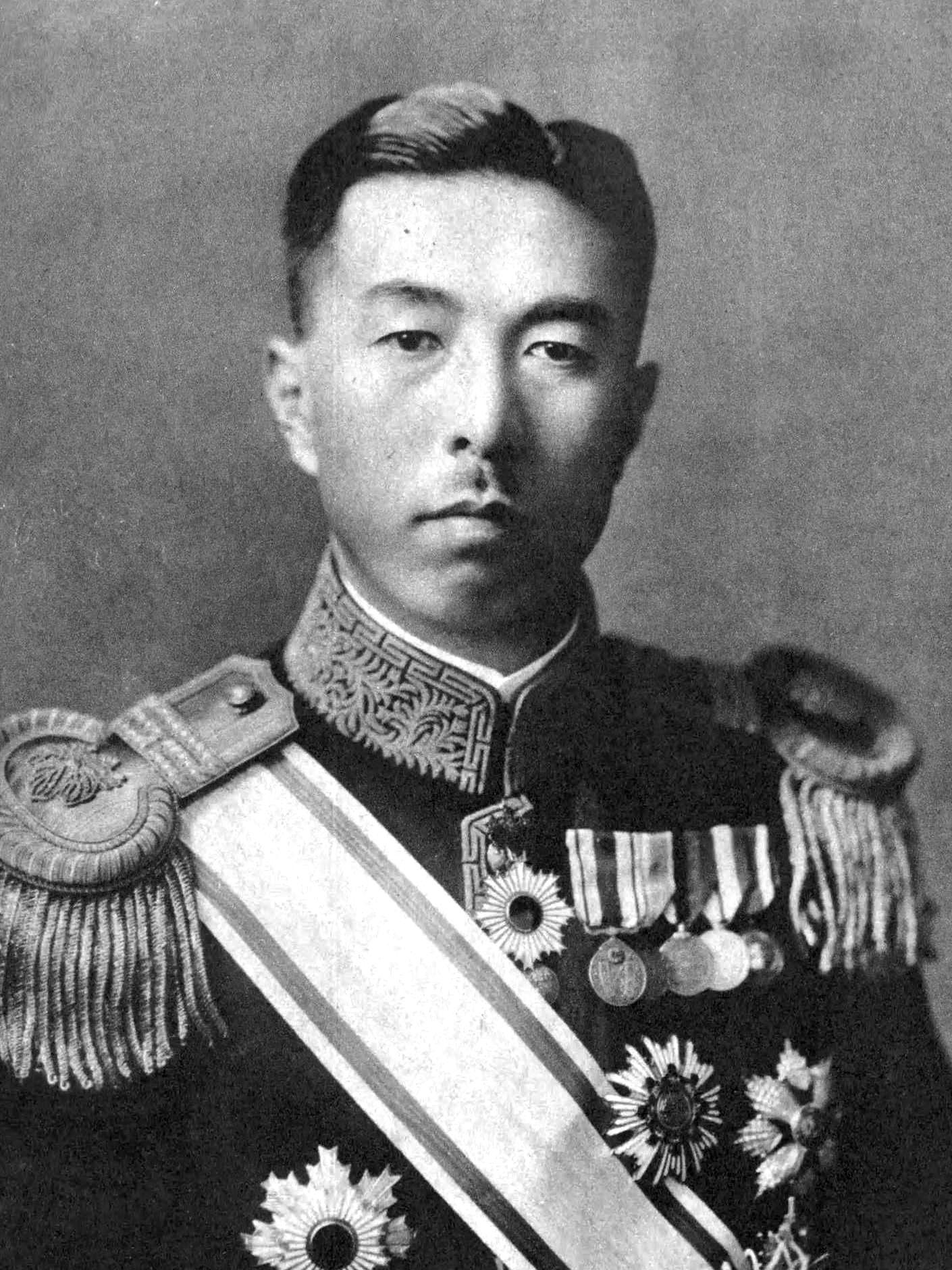
Prince Fumimaro Konoe, Prime Minister of Japan from 1940 to 1941

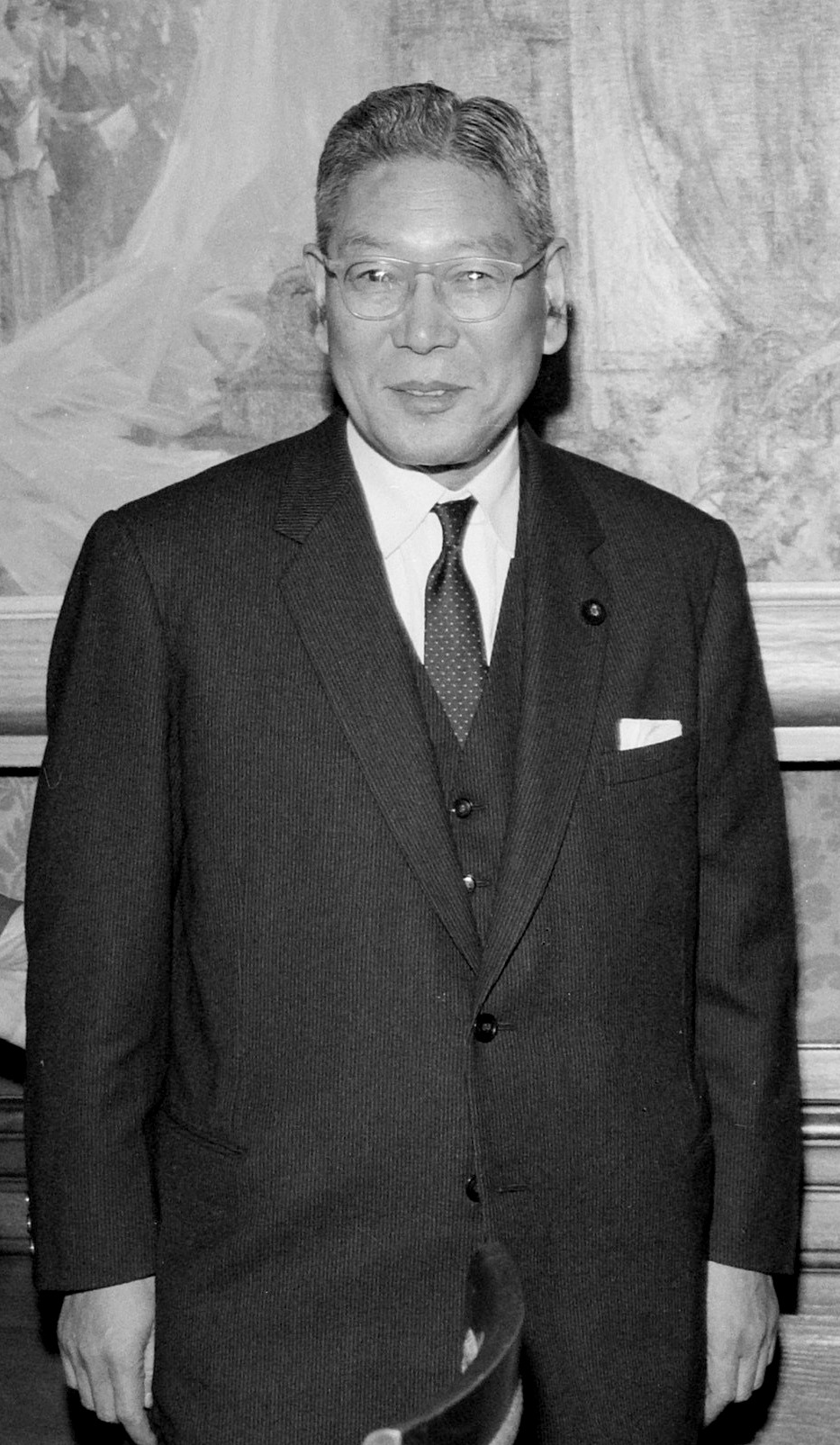
Hayato Ikeda, Prime Minister of Japan from 1960 to 1964

Two Prime Ministers of Japan, Fumimaro Konoe and Hayato Ikeda, attended Kyoto University: Apart from these two, Osachi Hamaguchi, Kijūrō Shidehara, and Tetsu Katayama attended the Third Higher School before going on to study at UTokyo. The former President of Taiwan, Lee Teng-hui, attended KyotoU when Taiwan was a Japanese colony but transferred to National Taiwan University after Japan lost the Second World War.

== See also ==
- List of Nobel laureates affiliated with Kyoto University
- Kikuchi Dairoku
- List of National Treasures of Japan (archaeological materials)
- Yoshida dormitory, Kyoto University
- Hitoshi Okamura
