= Graduate School of Letters and Faculty of Letters, Kyoto University =

Graduate School of Letters and Faculty of Letters Kyoto University
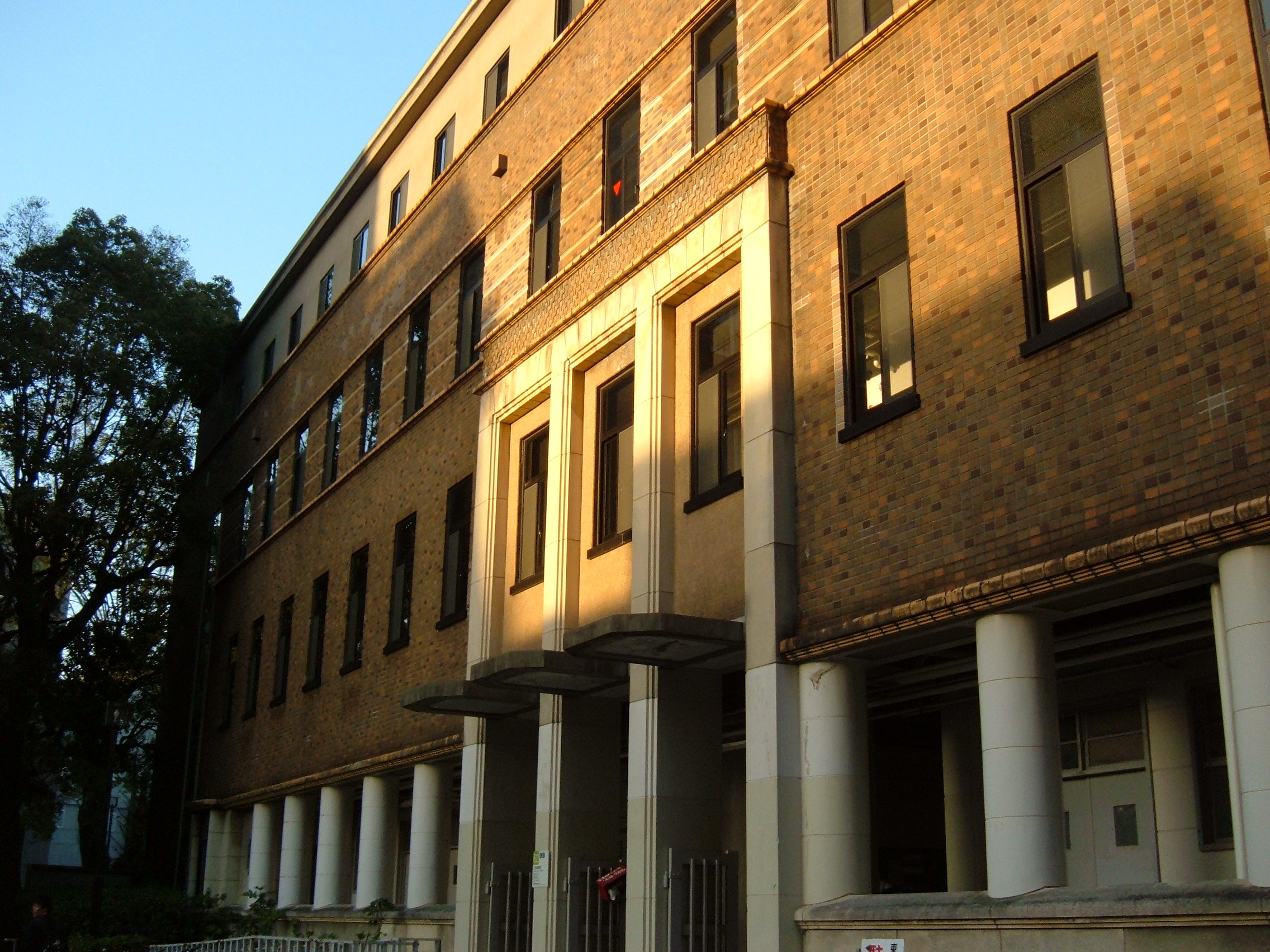
- Letters East Building, Yoshida Campus, Kyoto University
- Established: 1906
- Dean: Yuko Kizu
- Undergraduates: 1,075 (2020)
- Postgraduates: 464 (2020)
- Location: Kyoto, Japan
- Website: https://www.bun.kyoto-u.ac.jp/en/

Graduate School of Letters and Faculty of Letters (京都大学大学院文学研究科･文学部) is one of the schools at Kyoto University. The Faculty (Undergraduate) and Graduate School operate as one.

According to QS World University Rankings by Subject 2022: Arts and Humanities, Kyoto University is ranked 2nd in Japan and 58th in the world.

As of 2020, there are 1,075 undergraduate and 464 graduate students.

== Organization ==
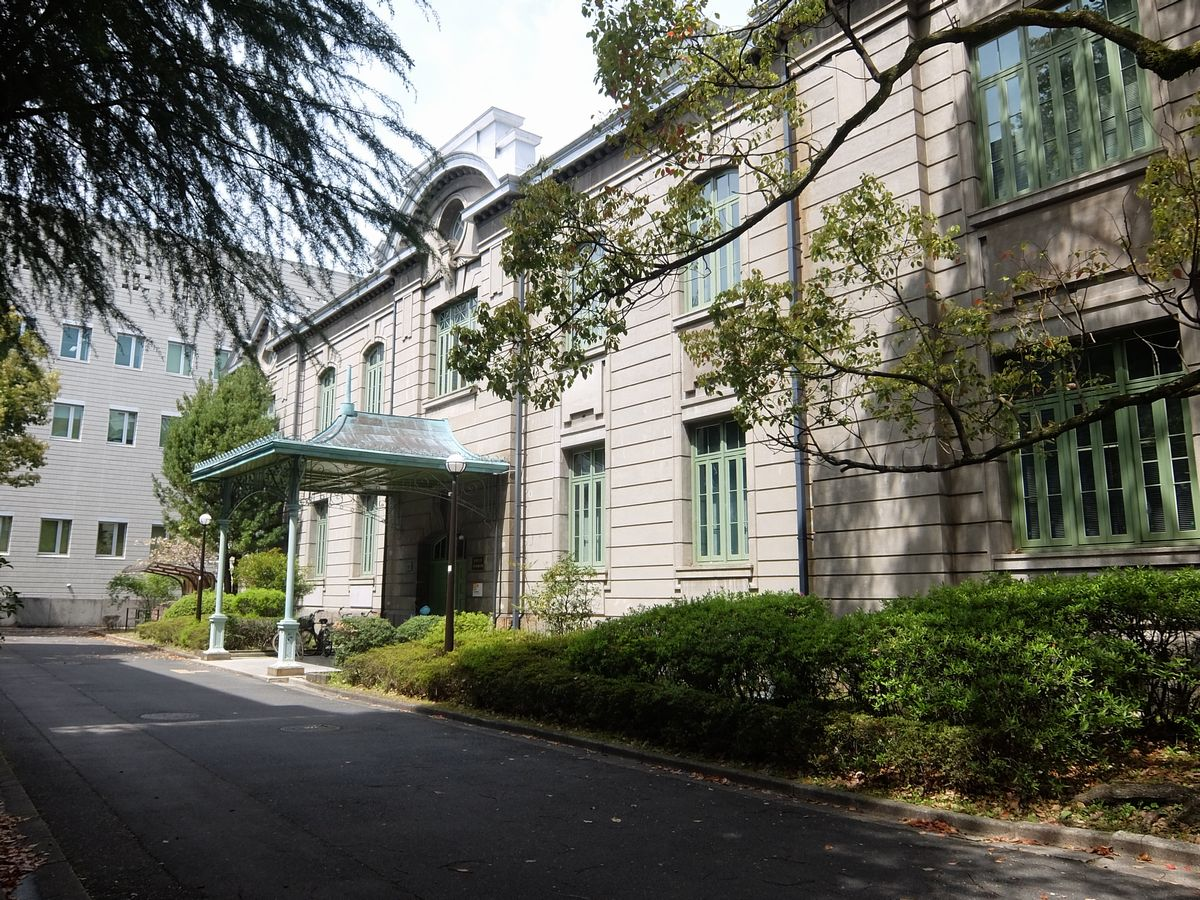
Faculty of Letters Exhibition Hall

=== Program ===
- Undergraduate Program
  - First year: liberal arts education
  - Second year: choosing a Division
  - Third year: choosing a Department
  - Fourth year: submitting a graduation thesis
- Graduate Programs
  - 2-year Master's Program (for Bachelor's degree holders)
  - 3-year Doctoral Program (for Master's degree holders)

=== Divisions ===
It has 5 divisions and dozens of departments, which cover almost all areas of the humanities.

- Division of Philology and Literature
  - Eastern
    - Japanese Language and Literature
    - Chinese Language and Literature
    - History of Chinese philosophy
    - Indological Studies
    - Buddhist Studies
  - Western
    - Classics
    - Slavic Languages and Literatures
    - German Language and Literature
    - English/American Language and Literature
    - French Language and Literature
    - Italian Language and Literature
- Division of Philosophy
  - Philosophy
  - History of Western Philosophy
  - Japanese Philosophy
  - Ethics
  - Philosophy of Religion
  - Christian Studies
  - Aesthetics and Art History
- Division of History
  - Japanese History
  - Oriental History
  - West-Asian History
  - European History
  - Archaeology
- Division of Behavioral Studies
  - Psychology
  - Linguistics
  - Sociology
  - Geography
- Division of Contemporary Culture
  - Philosophy and History of Science
  - Media and Culture Studies
  - Humanistic Informatics
  - Twentieth Century Studies
  - Contemporary History
- Division of the Joint Degree Master of Arts (with Heidelberg University)

== See also ==
- Kyoto School
- Heidelberg University
