= Academic minor =

Secondary undergraduate academic discipline

An academic minor is a secondary area of study of an undergraduate college or university student, in addition to their "major". The institution lays out a framework of required classes or class types a student must complete to earn the minor – although the latitude the student is given varies. Academic minors and majors differ in that the former is subordinate to the latter – fewer courses are required to complete a minor program of study than a major program of study. A minor is usually optional, and an undergraduate student does not have to select one.

Some students will prepare for their intended career with their major, while pursuing personal interests with a minor, for example, majoring in civil engineering while minoring in a foreign language or performing arts. Other students may pursue a minor to provide specific specialization and thus make themselves more attractive to employers. It is not infrequent for a physics major to minor in computer science, or an engineering or economics student to minor in mathematics. Students intending to become secondary education teachers often major in their teaching subject area (for example, history or chemistry) and minor in education.

Academic minors are most prevalent in the United States and, to a lesser extent, in other English-speaking countries.

== Postgraduate minor ==
While academic minors are usually associated with undergraduate degrees as a student's secondary focus, academic minors also exist at the postgraduate level, particularly in US institutions. This can refer to a student's minor or secondary field within a different discipline.

== See also ==
- British undergraduate degree classification
- Curriculum
- Double degree
- Higher education
