= Academic specialization =

Course of study or field of practice

In academia, specialization (or specialisation) may refer to a course of study or major at an academic institution, or may refer to the field in which a specialist practices.

In the case of an educator, academic specialization pertains to the subject that they specialize in and teach. It is considered a precondition of objective truth and works by restricting the mind's propensity for eclecticism through methodological rigor and studious effort. It is also employed as an information-management strategy, which operates by fragmenting an issue into different fields or areas of expertise to obtain truth. In recent years, a new avenue of specialization has manifested through double majoring. It is a way to allow for a more diverse exposure to the college curriculum.

== Development ==
As the volume of knowledge accumulated by humanity became too great, increasing specialization in academia appeared in response. There are also cases when this concept emerged from state policymaking to pursue goals such as national competitiveness. For instance, there is the case of Britain who began coordinating academic specialization — through the founding of Imperial College — to catch up to the United States and Germany, particularly in the fields of scientific and technical education.

The split between the sciences and humanities was described by C. P. Snow as "The Two Cultures".

== Counter-developments ==
Interdisciplinary studies are an attempt to resist this siloing of knowledge. The integrated human studies movement is another counter-approach to specialization.

== See also ==
- Academic discipline
- List of academic fields
