= Integrated human studies =

Field of education

Integrated human studies is an emerging educational field that equips people with knowledge and competencies across a range of disciplines to enable them to address the challenges facing human beings this century. It differs from other interdisciplinary educational initiatives in that its curriculum is purpose-designed rather than simply an amalgamation of existing disciplines.

Kyoto University in Japan has offered a formal course in integrated human studies since 1992 when it reorganized its College of Liberal Arts and Sciences and renamed it the Faculty of Integrated Human Studies. This was subsequently (in 2003) integrated with the Graduate School of Human and Environmental Studies to create the new Graduate School of Human and Environmental Studies.

The University of Western Australia established the Center for Integrated Human Studies in early 2008. This centre brings together the sciences, social sciences, arts and humanities to focus on the nature and future of humankind. Its fundamental concern is to promote human well-being at an individual, local and global level within a sustainable environment.

Integration of disciplinary fields has arisen as a response to the "increasing specialization of [university] courses to meet the demands of technological progress, economic growth and vocational training" resulting in the development of ever narrower fields of study at tertiary level. Proponents of integrated human studies believe that a broader, interdisciplinary approach is needed to enable future decision-makers to grasp the complexities of the issues facing humankind in the 21st century and craft workable solutions.
