= Yoshida dormitory, Kyoto University =

Self-governed student dormitory at Kyoto University, Japan

Coordinates: 35°01′21″N 135°46′48″E

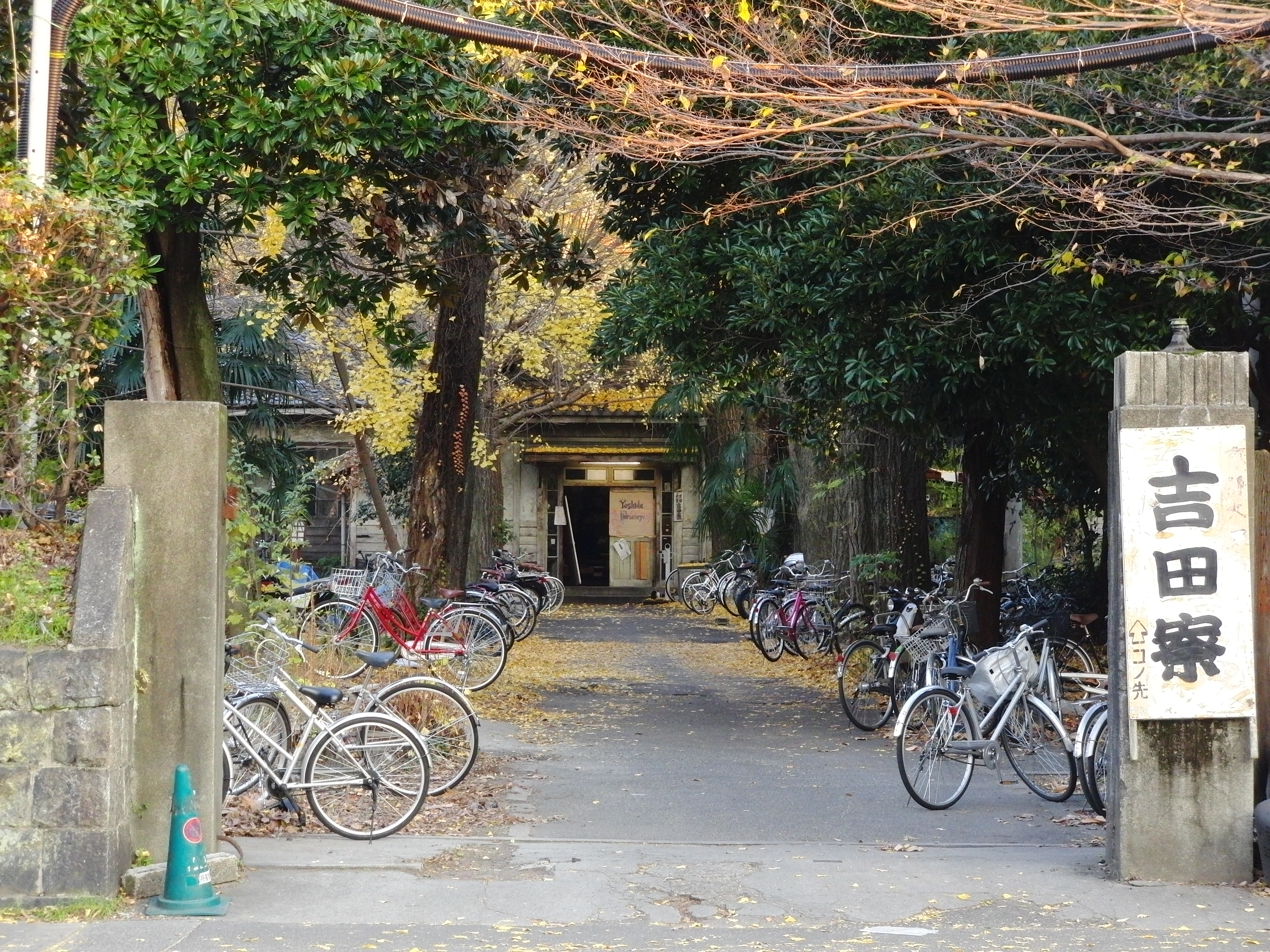
Residents' bicycles line the dormitory's front entrance.

The Yoshida dormitory (吉田寮, Yoshidaryō) is a student dormitory on the Yoshida Campus of Kyoto University. Built in 1913, it is the oldest student dormitory in Japan. Its associated dining hall, built in 1889, is the oldest structure on any Kyoto University campus.

== History ==
The community agreed to create the dormitory with the student body taking administrative responsibility, but starting in the early 1970s both the Ministry of Education and the university leadership attempted to shut down dorms, including Yoshida, that they identified as "hotbeds for various kinds of conflict." Residents of Yoshida consistently resisted these efforts, including refusing to leave the dorm when, in 1986, the university announced a deadline for demolishing the dormitory. In June 2009 Kyoto University authorities proposed a plan for the partial demolition of the old dormitory to increase on-campus living capacity, but after an informal debate was held between university authorities and the community, the proposal failed to achieve support from dormitory residents.

== Festival ==
The Yoshida Dormitory Festival is one of the largest of the many events at Kyoto University. It is held in May every year and is open to external participants. Among its events are the Kamogawa Race, in which participants run from Sanzyō Big Bridge to Demachiyanagi via Kamo River, preceded by a costume party and river swim.

== Rooms ==
The Yoshida dormitory consists of 120 Japanese-style rooms and has a kitchen, showers, bathrooms, laundry rooms, common rooms, and a vegetable garden.
