= Yoshida Station (disambiguation) =

Yoshida Station or 吉田駅 may refer to:

- Yoshida Station (吉田駅 (新潟県), on the JR East Echigo and Yahiko Lines in Tsubame, Niigata Prefecture, Japan
- Hamayoshida Station (浜吉田駅), formerly Yoshida Station, on the JR East Jōban Line in Watari, Miyagi Prefecture, Japan
- Iyo-Yoshida Station (伊予吉田駅), on the Shikoku Railway Yosan Line in Yoshida-chō, Uwajima, Ehime Prefecture, Japan
- Kira Yoshida Station (吉良吉田駅), on the Nagoya Railroad Gamogōri and Nishio Lines in Kira, Aichi Prefecture, Japan
- Shinano-Yoshida Station (信濃吉田駅), on the Nagano Electric Railway Nagano Line in Nagano, Nagano Prefecture, Japan
- Yoshita Station (吉田駅 (大阪府)), on the Kintetsu Keihanna Line in Higashiosaka, Osaka Prefecture, Japan

== See also ==
- Yoshidaguchi Station (吉田口駅), on the JR West Geibi Line in Akitakata, Hiroshima Prefecture, Japan
