= Kyoto University School of Informatics =

School at Kyoto University in Kyoto, Japan

Coordinates: 35.0304°N 135.7795°E

The Graduate School of Informatics at Kyoto University was founded in 1998, incorporating four former departments of the Graduate School of Engineering: Electronic and Communication, Applied Mathematics and Physics, Information Science, and Applied Systems Science. It includes faculty from diverse disciplines, including human studies, letters, economics, medicine, agriculture and mathematics.

Kyoto University adopts the Edinburgh definition of Informatics as the study of information in natural and artificial systems.

== Departments of the School of Informatics ==
- Intelligence Science and Technology,
- Social Informatics,
- Applied Analysis and Complex Dynamical Systems,
- Applied Mathematics and Physics,
- Systems Science, and
- Communications and Computer Engineering.
