= Graduate School of Science and Faculty of Science, Kyoto University =

University faculty in Kyoto, Japan

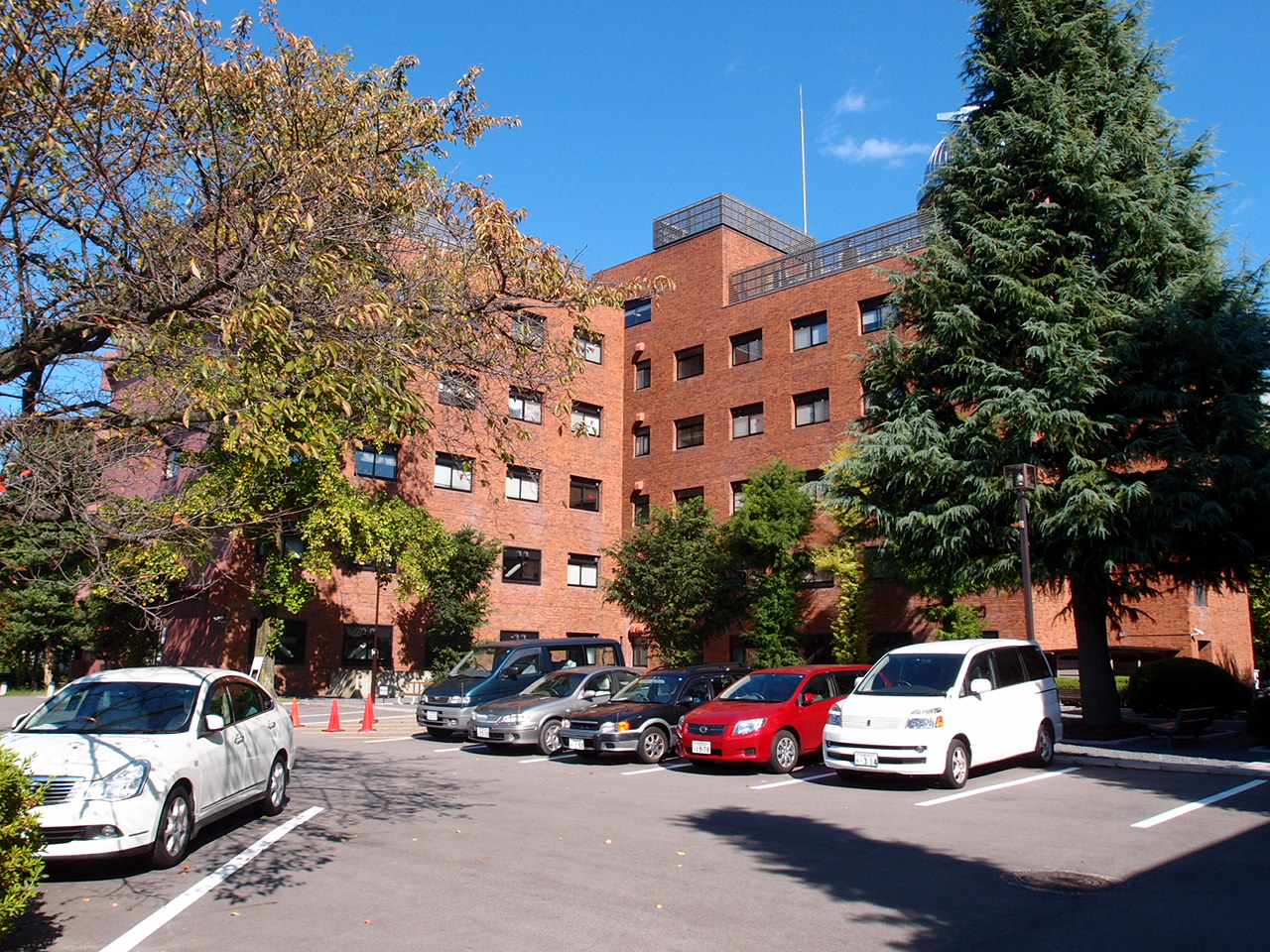
Graduate School of Science Building No. 4 (Yoshida Campus)

Graduate School of Science and Faculty of Science (京都大学大学院理学研究科・理学部) is one of schools at the Kyoto University. The Faculty (undergraduate school) and the graduate School operate as one.

== Divisions and facilities ==
The Faculty of Science comprises the following departments and facilities;

=== Divisions ===
- Mathematics and Mathematical Sciences
- Physics and Astronomy
- Earth and Planetary Sciences
- Chemistry
- Biological Sciences

=== Facilities ===
- Astronomical Observatory
- Data Analysis Center for Geomagnetism
- Institute for Geothermal Sciences
- Aso Volcanological Laboratory

== Rankings ==
According to the QS World University Rankings by Subject 2022, Kyoto University is ranked second in Japan and 25th in the world in the field of Natural Sciences.

In Kawaijuku's 2022 Entrance Examination Ranking, the school received score 65.0, the highest of any natural science school in western Japan.

== Notable alumni ==
=== Nobel Laureates ===
- Hideki Yukawa, Physics, 1949
- Shinichiro Tomonaga, Physics, 1965
- Susumu Tonegawa, Physiology or Medicine, 1987
- Isamu Akasaki, Physics, 2014

=== Engineering fields medalists ===
- Heisuke Hironaka, 1970
- Shigefumi Mori, 1990
