= Joint honours degree =

Combining multiple fields of study in one degree

A joint honours degree (also known as dual honours, double majors, or two-subject moderatorship) is a specific type of degree offered generally at the Honours Bachelor's degree level by certain universities in Ireland, the UK, Canada, Malta, and Australia. In a joint honours degree, two (or more) subjects are studied concurrently within the timeframe of one honours.

== Requirements ==
A joint honours degree typically requires at least half, often almost all, of the credits required for each of its respective subjects. The two subjects do not have to be highly related; indeed, a true joint honours degree overlaps faculties, not just subjects. However, students often pick two subjects that are interrelated in some fundamental way (such as both subjects are in the arts), or have covert connections (business with media).

Usually, joint honours degrees have higher requirements for entry than a single honours degree, requiring the approval of both departments concerned. The two subjects are then taken at the same levels and at the academic standards as those taking either subject as a single honours major. It is usual for these degrees to entail more study than a single honours degree (for example, both majors must be passed to earn the "joint degree" and honours must be obtained in the case of each major to earn the honours degree title); whereas this would normally apply to the only one subject major for a single honours student. In some cases, students would have significantly more final year project work and could be examined on this by both departments in question. Many British universities now have a dedicated Centre for Joint Honours Degrees which assists students with timetable structuring, etc.

== Differences ==
A joint honours degree is different from BA (Hons.) degree where two subjects are listed in the degree title. In a single honours degree, one of these is a major and the other a minor; In a BA/BSc/BEng (Joint Hons.) both subjects are majors. A joint honours degree is also different from a double degree scheme: a double degree entails two separate degrees (e.g., a Bachelor of Science and a Bachelor of Arts) each of which with their own electives, etc.

== Examples ==
Selected examples of joint honours degrees:

- Architecture and Planning
- Architecture and Structural Engineering
- Biology and Chemistry
- Botany and Zoology
- Business and Management
- Business and Economics
- Computing and Business
- Computing and Mathematics
- Drama and History of Art
- Economics and Accountancy
- Economics and History
- Economics and Management
- Economics and Politics
- Electronics and Computer Science
- Forensics and Anthropology
- History and International Relations
- History and Literature
- History and Politics
- Journalism and Literature
- Mathematics and Computer Science
- A Modern Foreign Language and Linguistics
- A Modern Foreign Language and History
- A Modern Foreign Language and a Classical Language (example: French and Latin)
- Modern Languages and History
- Music and Education
- Palaeobiology and Geology
- Palaeontology and Evolution
- Physics and Mathematics
- Physics and Philosophy
- Physiology and Pharmacology
- Politics and International Relations
- Public Administration and Political Science
